= BAR Aviation Uganda =

Airline based in Uganda

Coordinates: 00°02′40″N 32°26′35″E

IATA	ICAO	Call sign
HE	n/a	BAR AVIATION
- Founded: 2008; 18 years ago
- Hubs: Entebbe International Airport
- Secondary hubs: Kajjansi Airport
- Focus cities: Kampala, Entebbe, Arua, Kisoro, Kasese
- Fleet size: 19
- Destinations: 13
- Parent company: BAR Aviation Uganda Limited
- Headquarters: Kampala, Uganda
- Key people: Barak Orland (CEO)
- Website: Homepage

BAR Aviation Uganda (IATA: HE, ICAO: n/a), is a Ugandan aviation company offering; charter services, pilot training, air ambulance services, and aircraft maintenance services. Its main base is Entebbe International Airport. The company also maintains a second hub at Kajjansi Airport, in Wakiso District, off of the Kampala-Entebbe Road, in the Central Region of the country.

== Destinations ==
According to its website, as of March 2022, BAR Aviation operates regular scheduled airline services to the following destinations:

Country	City	Airport	Notes	Refs
Uganda	Arua	Arua Airport	—	
Uganda	Kihihi	Kihihi Airport	—	
Uganda	Kisoro	Kisoro Airport	—	
Uganda	Chobe	Chobe Safari Lodge Airport	—	
Uganda	Bugungu	Bugungu Airstrip	—	
Uganda	Entebbe	Entebbe International Airport	Hub	
Uganda	Semliki	Semliki Airstrip	—	
Uganda	Pakuba	Pakuba Airport	—	
Uganda	Kasese	Kasese Airport	—	
Uganda	Mbarara	Mbarara Airport	—	
Uganda	Mweya	Mweya Airport	—	
Uganda	Kajjansi	Kajjansi Airfield	Hub	
Uganda	Jinja	Jinja Airport	—	

== Fleet ==
As of May 2024, the BAR Aviation fleet includes the following aircraft:

BAR Aviation Uganda fleet
Aircraft	In fleet	Orders	Passengers				Notes
Aircraft	In fleet	Orders	F	C	Y	Total	Notes
Boeing 737-400	1						
Hercules L100-30	3	0	0	0	Cargo	0	
Challenger – 604	1	0	0	0	9	9	
Gulfstream G400	1				14		
Cessna Citation Mustang	1				4		
Beechcraft 1900D	2	0	0	0	19	19	(as of August 2025)
Pilatus PC-12	1	0	0	0	8	8	
Cessna 208 Caravan	6	0	0	0	12	12	
Cessna 172	4	0	0	0	4	4	
Eurocopter EC130	1	0	0	0	6	6	
Airbus H125	1				5		
B505 Jet Ranger X	1	0	0	0	4	4	
Bell 206 Jet Ranger	1	0	0	0	4	4	
Bell 412	15	0	0	0	12	12	
Total	39	0					

== History ==
BAR Aviation was established in Uganda in 2008. It began with pilot training, air charter services and aircraft maintenance services. The airline began scheduled flight services in Uganda on 1 February 2022. BAR Aviation Uganda utilizes the AeroCRS Cloud Reservation System.

The airline expects to participate in the revival of the tourism sector, following devastation by the COVID-19 pandemic. In addition, with the ongoing expansion of the country's petrochemical industry, a number of aircraft acquisitions are targeted towards medical evacuation activities.

BAR Aviation Uganda has an interline agreement with Uganda Airlines, on domestic travel, within Uganda.

== See also ==
- List of airlines of Uganda
