= Mbarara Airport =

Airport in Uganda

Mbarara Airport Nyakisharara International Airport
- IATA: MBQ; ICAO: HUMA

Summary
- Airport type: Public
- Owner: Civil Aviation Authority of Uganda
- Serves: Mbarara, Uganda
- Elevation AMSL: 4,600 ft (1,400 m)
- Coordinates: 00°33′18″S 30°36′00″E

Map
- Location of Mbarara Airport in Uganda

Runways
Direction	Length		Surface
Direction	m	ft	Surface
11/29	1,660	5,446	Gravel
- Sources: Google Maps GCM

Mbarara Airport (IATA: MBQ, ICAO: HUMA) is a civilian airport that serves the city of Mbarara in the Ankole sub-region, Uganda. It is one of 12 upcountry airports administered by the Civil Aviation Authority of Uganda. The airport was originally named Nyakisharara Airport.

The airport is approximately 9 kilometres (5.6 mi) north-west of Mbarara, on the road to Bwizibwera and Ibanda.

The runway length includes gravelled overruns of 190 and 85 metres (623 and 279 ft) on the east and west ends respectively.

== Airlines and destinations ==
Airlines	Destinations
BAR Aviation	Entebbe, Jinja, Pakuba

- List of airports in Uganda
- Transport in Uganda

== See also ==
- List of airports in Uganda
- Transport in Uganda
- Ugandan space initiatives
- Entebbe International Airport
- Civil Aviation Authority of Uganda
