= Kidepo Airport =

Airport in Lomej, Uganda

- IATA: none; ICAO: HUKD

Summary
- Airport type: Public
- Owner: Civil Aviation Authority
- Serves: Kidepo Valley National Park, Uganda
- Location: Lomej
- Elevation AMSL: 3,700 ft (1,100 m)
- Coordinates: 03°43′09″N 033°45′15″E

Map
- Location of airport in Uganda

Runways
Direction	Length		Surface
Direction	m	ft	Surface
08/26	1,500	4,921	Unpaved

Kidepo Airport (ICAO: HUKD) is an airfield in Northern Region, Uganda. The airport is at Lomej, approximately 3 kilometres (2 mi) south of the headquarters of Kidepo Valley National Park, and 456 kilometres (283 mi) northeast of Entebbe International Airport, the country's largest civilian and military airport.

Kidepo Airport is one of twelve upcountry airports that are administered by the Uganda Civil Aviation Authority, and one of the five upcountry airports that are authorized to handle cross-border air traffic from member countries of the East African Community, in an effort to promote tourism in Eastern Africa. The other airports with similar authorization are Arua Airport, Gulu Airport, Kasese Airport, and Kisoro Airport. Kidepo Airport receives daily flights from Entebbe International Airport and Murchison Falls National Park, which are primarily used by tourists to visit Kidepo Valley National Park.

== Facilities ==
The airport is situated at an elevation of 3,700 feet (1,128 m) above sea level. It has a single unpaved runway which measures 1,500 metres (4,921 ft) in length and 21 metres (69 ft) in width, although aeronautical charts give the runway length as 1,494 metres (4,902 ft).

== Airlines and destinations ==
Airlines	Destinations
Aerolink Uganda	Entebbe

== See also ==
- Kidepo Valley National Park
- Civil Aviation Authority of Uganda
- List of airports in Uganda
- East African Community
