= Lira Airport =

Airport in Uganda

- IATA: none; ICAO: HULI

Summary
- Airport type: Public
- Owner: Civil Aviation Authority of Uganda
- Serves: Lira, Uganda
- Elevation AMSL: 3,580 ft / 1,091 m
- Coordinates: 2°14′52″N 32°54′35″E

Map
- Location of the airport in Uganda

Runways
Direction	Length		Surface
Direction	m	ft	Surface
10/28	940	3,084	Murram
- Sources: UCAA Google Maps GCM

Lira Airport (ICAO: HULI) is an airport serving Lira, a town in the Lira District of Uganda. Lira Airport is one of twelve upcountry airports that are administered by the Civil Aviation Authority of Uganda. It is also one of the 46 airports in the country.

== Location ==
Lira Airport is in northern Uganda, approximately 250 kilometres (160 mi) by air, north of Entebbe International Airport, the country's largest civilian and military airport.

== See also ==
- Transport in Uganda
- List of airports in Uganda
- Lango sub-region
