= Aerolink Uganda =

Ugandan private airline

Coordinates: 00°02′40″N 32°26′34″E

AeroLink Uganda
IATA	ICAO	Call sign
A8	XAU	PEARL
- Founded: 2012; 14 years ago
- Operating bases: Entebbe International Airport
- Focus cities: Kampala, Entebbe
- Fleet size: 4
- Destinations: 12
- Parent company: Airkenya
- Headquarters: Entebbe International Airport
- Key people: Captain Catherine Mugo (Country Manager)
- Website: www.aerolinkuganda.com

Aerolink Uganda is a privately owned airline in Uganda, licensed by the Uganda Civil Aviation Authority with an air operator's certificate. It specializes in transporting tourists to Uganda's National Parks, saving their time and allowing them to see more.

== Location ==
The headquarters of Aerolink Uganda are located inside Entebbe International Airport, Uganda's largest civilian airport. The geographical coordinates of the airline's headquarters are: 0°02'40.0"N, 32°26'34.0"E (Latitude:0.044444; Longitude:32.442778).

== Overview ==
Aerolink Uganda, whose owners are based in neighboring Kenya, was established in 2012. The airline flies tourists between Entebbe and Uganda's national parks. Daily scheduled flights are available to Kisoro Airport, Kihihi Airstrip, Kasese Airport, and Mweya Airport, all in the Western Region of Uganda. Flights are available three days a week, with minimum passenger numbers to airfields Murchison Falls National Park and Kidepo Valley National Park, both in the Northern Region of Uganda.

== Destinations ==
From its hub in Entebbe International Airport, the company operates scheduled services to destinations within East Africa. Following is a list of destinations that Aerolink Uganda serves, as of May 2019.

Country	City	Airport	Notes	Refs
Kenya	Masai Mara	Mara Serena Airport	—	
Kenya	Kisumu	Kisumu International Airport	—	
Uganda	Bugungu	Bugungu Airstrip	—	
Uganda	Chobe	Chobe Safari Lodge Airport	—	
Uganda	Entebbe/Kampala	Entebbe International Airport	Hub	
Uganda	Kasese	Kasese Airport	—	
Uganda	Kidepo	Kidepo Airport	—	
Uganda	Kihihi	Kihihi Airstrip	—	
Uganda	Kisoro	Kisoro Airport	—	
Uganda	Mweya	Mweya Airport	—	
Uganda	Pakuba	Pakuba Airfield	—	
Uganda	Semliki	Semliki Airstrip	—	

== Flight scheduling ==
The flight schedule of the airline is given in detail at the website of the Uganda Wildlife Authority.

== Affiliations ==
Aerolink Uganda is affiliated and shares common ownership with Air Kenya and Regional Air of Tanzania.

== Fleet ==
As of May 2019, Aerolink Uganda maintained the following aircraft in service.

Aerolink Uganda fleet
Aircraft	In fleet	Order	Passengers	Notes
Cessna 208 Caravan	4	0	12	
Total	4	0		

== See also ==
- Airlines of Africa
- List of airlines of Uganda
