= Kisoro Airport =

Airport in Uganda

- IATA: KXO; ICAO: HUKI

Summary
- Airport type: Public
- Owner: Civil Aviation Authority of Uganda
- Serves: Kisoro, Uganda
- Elevation AMSL: 6,200 ft (1,900 m)
- Coordinates: 1°17′00″S 29°43′10″E

Map
- Location of the airport in Uganda

Runways
Direction	Length		Surface
Direction	m	ft	Surface
18/36	1,130	3,707	Asphalt
- Sources: CAA Google Maps SkyVector

Kisoro Airport (ICAO: HUKI) is an airport serving the town of Kisoro in Uganda and nearby Bwindi Impenetrable National Park and Mgahinga Gorilla National Park. It is in extreme southwestern Uganda, 6 kilometres (4 mi) north of the Rwanda border, and approximately 343 kilometres (213 mi) by air southwest of Entebbe International Airport, the country's largest civilian and military airport. It is one of twelve upcountry airports administered by the Civil Aviation Authority of Uganda.

The airport is mainly used by small planes flying tourists on a daily basis to Mgahinga Gorilla National Park, the southern side of Bwindi Impenetrable National Park, as well as connecting onto Queen Elizabeth National Park. As of 2017, the airport does not accommodate international flights. The Civil Aviation Authority of Uganda has hinted on plans of upgrading the Kisoro Airport.

The Kisoro non-directional beacon (Ident: KS) is located on the field.

== Airlines and destinations ==
Airlines	Destinations
Aerolink Uganda	Entebbe
BAR Aviation Uganda	Kajjansi

== See also ==
- Transport in Uganda
- List of airports in Uganda
