= Kasenyi Airport =

- IATA: none; ICAO: HULA

Summary
- Airport type: Civilian
- Owner: Queen Elizabeth National Park
- Serves: Kasenyi, Uganda
- Location: Kasenyi, Uganda
- Elevation AMSL: 3,100 ft (940 m)
- Coordinates: 0.0292°S 30.1411°E

Map
- Location within Uganda

Runways
Direction	Length		Surface
Direction	ft	m	Surface
			Unpaved

Kasenyi Airport (ICAO: HULA) is an airport in Uganda. It is one of the forty six airports in the country.

== Location ==
Kasenyi Airport is located in Kasenyi, Kasese District, in western Uganda, approximately 250 kilometres (160 mi), by air, west of Entebbe International Airport, the country's largest civilian and military airport. The geographic coordinates of this airport are not known because the airport does not appear on most publicly available maps, as of January 2010. The airport has a single unpaved runway whose exact measurements are unknown at this time. The airport is situated on the eastern shores of Lake George, in Queen Elizabeth National Park.

== Overview ==
Kasenyi Airport is a small civilian airport that serves the area of Kasenyi and the neighboring areas of Queen Elizabeth National Park. As of January 2010, the airport is not yet under the administration of the Uganda Civil Aviation Authority. The elevation of Kasenyi Airport is 930 metres (3,050 ft) above sea level.

== See also ==
- Kasenyi
- Queen Elizabeth National Park
- Civil Aviation Authority of Uganda
- Transport in Uganda
- List of airports in Uganda
