= Kitgum Airport =

Airport in Uganda

- IATA: none; ICAO: HUKT

Summary
- Airport type: Civilian
- Owner: Kitgum Municipality
- Serves: Kitgum, Uganda
- Elevation AMSL: 3,130 ft / 954 m
- Coordinates: 3°17′00″N 32°53′15″E

Map
- Location of the airport in Uganda

Runways
Direction	Length		Surface
Direction	m	ft	Surface
15/33	1,500	4,921	Dirt
- Sources: OurAirports Google Maps GCM

Kitgum Airport (ICAO: HUKT) is an airport in Uganda. It is one of the 46 airports in the country.

== Location ==
Kitgum Airport is in the town of Kitgum, in Kitgum District, Acholi sub-region, in the Northern Region of Uganda. It lies in the center of town, just west of the Kitgum-Lira Road. It is approximately 363 kilometres (226 mi), by air, north of Entebbe International Airport, Uganda's largest civilian and military airport.

== Overview ==
Kitgum Airport is a small civilian airport that serves the town of Kitgum and the surrounding areas of Kitgum District.

The airport has a single unpaved runway that is full width for 1,500 metres (4,900 ft) with another unobstructed 400 metres (1,300 ft) overrun available on the southern end.

== See also ==
- Transport in Uganda
- List of airports in Uganda
