= Nebbi Airport =

- IATA: none; ICAO: n/a

Summary
- Airport type: Civilian
- Owner: Civil Aviation Authority of Uganda
- Serves: Nebbi, Uganda
- Location: Nebbi, Uganda
- Elevation AMSL: 3,000 ft / 914 m
- Coordinates: 02°30′49″N 031°07′57″E

Map
- Location of Nebbi Airport in Uganda

Runways
Direction	Length		Surface
Direction	ft	m	Surface
06/24	3,870	1,180	Unpaved
- Source: Google Maps

Nebbi Airport (IATA: n/a, ICAO: n/a) is an airport in Uganda. It is one of the 46 airports in the country.

== Location ==
Nebbi Airport is located in the town of Nebbi, in Nebbi District, in northwestern Uganda. It is approximately 5 kilometres (3.1 mi), by road, northeast of downtown Nebbi, just north of the highway from Arua to Gulu. The airport is approximately 310 kilometres (190 mi), by air, northwest of Entebbe International Airport, Uganda's largest civilian and military airport.

== Overview ==
As of December 2009, the airport was not under the administration of the Civil Aviation Authority of Uganda.

== See also ==
- List of airports in Uganda
- West Nile sub-region
