= Kabale Airport =

Airport in Uganda

Kabale Airport Batuma Memorial Airstrip
- IATA: none; ICAO: HUKB

Summary
- Airport type: Public
- Owner: Kabale Municipality
- Serves: Kabale, Uganda
- Elevation AMSL: 5,850 ft (1,780 m)
- Coordinates: 01°13′33″S 29°57′36″E

Map
- Location of airport in Uganda

Runways
Direction	Length		Surface
Direction	m	ft	Surface
12/30	1,400	4,593	Grass
- Source: OurAirports

Kabale Airport (ICAO: HUKB) is an airstrip serving Kabale, a town in the Kabale District in the Western Region of Uganda. It is one of the 46 airports in the country.

The public airport is about 5 kilometres (3 mi) by road west of Kabale, on the Kabale-Kisoro Road. It is approximately 311 kilometres (193 mi) by air south-west of Entebbe International Airport, Uganda's largest civilian and military airport.

As of January 2010, the airport was not under the administration of the Civil Aviation Authority of Uganda.

== Facilities ==
The airport has a single unpaved runway. Aeronautical charts show the runway length at 610 metres (2,000 ft), and satellite images indicate a maximum length of 1,400 metres (4,600 ft), while a newspaper article stated the land set aside for the runway was 1.5 kilometres (0.93 mi).
