= Kasese Airport =

Airport in Uganda

- IATA: KSE; ICAO: HUKS

Summary
- Airport type: Public, Civilian
- Owner/Operator: Civil Aviation Authority of Uganda
- Serves: Kasese, Uganda
- Elevation AMSL: 3,146 ft (959 m)
- Coordinates: 00°11′24″N 30°06′09″E

Map
- Location of airport in Uganda

Runways
Direction	Length		Surface
Direction	m	ft	Surface
01/19	1,600	5,249	Grass

Kasese Airport (IATA: KSE, ICAO: HUKS) is an airport in Uganda.

== Location ==
The airport is located in the town of Kasese, Kasese District, in the Western Region of Uganda, at the foothills of the Rwenzori Mountains and close to the international border with the Democratic Republic of the Congo. It is approximately 261 kilometres (162 mi), by air, west of Entebbe International Airport, the country's largest civilian and military airport. The coordinates of Kasese Airport are: 0°11'24.0"N 30°06'09.0"E (Latitude:0.190000; Longitude:30.102500).

== Overview ==
Kasese Airport is one of the 47 airports in the country. It is one of the twelve upcountry airports under the administration of the Civil Aviation Authority of Uganda (CAA). It is one of the five upcountry airports that are authorized to handle cross-border air traffic from member countries of the East African Community, as part of efforts to promote tourism within Eastern Africa. Kasese Airport receives daily domestic flights from Murchison Falls National Park, Entebbe International Airport and Kajjansi Airfield, which are frequently used by tourists to visit Queen Elizabeth National Park.

== Facilities ==
The airport which sits at an altitude of 959 metres (3,146 ft), above sea level, has a single grass runway that measures 1,600 metres (5,249 ft) long and is 30 metres (98 ft) wide.

== International airport ==
The Uganda CAA has plans to renovate and improve the airport by lengthening the runway to 8,210 feet (2,500 m). The runway will also be widened to 146 feet (45 m). The surface will be converted to tarmac.

A terminal building and aircraft fuel storage facilities will be constructed. A control tower will be erected. Customs and Immigration facilities will also be installed as well as cargo storage warehouses. As of October 2008, the construction plans have been approved and construction will begin as soon as the tenants on the land adjacent to the airport have been relocated. After all the renovations, Kasese Airport will be transformed into the "Kasese International Airport".

In 2010, the CAA awarded a contract to Gauff Consultants Limited for consultancy services for the redevelopment of preliminary master plans and detailed engineering designs for Gulu Airport for a price of about UGX:359 million (approx. US$217,000).

In July 2013, Ugandan print media indicated that renovations and upgrades were expected to begin in mid-2014. In November 2014, at a regional tourism conference in Kampala, President Museveni "confirmed Uganda has finalized plans to construct Kasese International Airport".

== Airlines and destinations ==
Airlines	Destinations
Aerolink Uganda	Entebbe
BAR Aviation	Entebbe

== See also ==
- List of airports in Uganda
- Transportation in Uganda
