= Tororo Airport =

Airport in Uganda

- IATA: TRY; ICAO: HUTO

Summary
- Airport type: Public
- Owner/Operator: Civil Aviation Authority of Uganda
- Serves: Tororo
- Elevation AMSL: 3,900 ft / 1,189 m
- Coordinates: 0°40′53″N 34°10′04″E

Map
- Location of the airport in Uganda

Runways
Direction	Length		Surface
Direction	m	ft	Surface
18/36	1,400	4,593	Murram

Tororo Airport (IATA: TRY, ICAO: HUTO) is an airport serving the town of Tororo in the Eastern Region of Uganda.

== Location ==
The airport is about 3 kilometres (2 mi) by road south of the town centre. This is about 249 kilometres (155 mi), by road, and 205 kilometres (127 mi), by air, north-east of Entebbe International Airport, the largest airport in Uganda. The coordinates of this airport are 00°40'53.0"N, 34°10'04.0"E (Latitude:0.681389; Longitude:34.167778).

== Overview ==
The airport is at an average elevation of 3,900 feet (1,200 m) and has a single murram-surfaced runway (18/36), measuring 4,593 feet (1,400 m) long and 98 feet (30 m) wide.

As of June 2015, the Civil Aviation Authority of Uganda had plans to develop this facility into a regional airport.

== See also ==
- List of airports in Uganda
- Transport in Uganda
