= Semliki Airstrip =

Ugandan airfield

- IATA: n/a; ICAO: n/a

Summary
- Airport type: Civilian
- Owner: Uganda Wildlife Authority
- Serves: Semliki, Uganda
- Location: Semliki, Uganda
- Coordinates: 00°53′45″N 30°21′09″E

Map

Runways
Direction	Length		Surface
Direction	m	ft	Surface
12/30			Unpaved

Semliki Airstrip (IATA: n/a, ICAO: n/a), also Semuliki Airstrip, is an airstrip serving the Semliki Wildlife Reserve and Semliki National Park, in the Western Region of Uganda.

== Location ==
Semliki Airstrip in located in the Kabarole District, inside the Semliki Wildlife Reserve, in the Toro sub-region, in Western Uganda. The geographical coordinates of Semliki Airstrip are 0°53'45.0"N 30°21'09.0"E (Latitude:0.895833; Longitude:30.352500).

== Overview ==
Semliki Airstrip is adjacent to Semliki Safari Lodge, within the nature reserve. Aircraft are allowed to land for a fee, collected by the Uganda Wildlife Authority. Transport to the Lodge by air, saves time and is less stressful than transport by automobile, on the narrow winding roads.

== Airlines and destinations ==
Airlines	Destinations
Aerolink Uganda	Entebbe
Fly Uganda	Kajjansi

== See also ==
- Transport in Uganda
- List of airports in Uganda
- List of airlines of Uganda
