= Kasenyi =

Kasenyi may refer to one of the following:

- Kasenyi, Buliisa, a settlement in Buliisa District, Western Region, Uganda
- Kasenyi, Kasese, a settlement in Kasese District, Western Region, Uganda
- Kasenyi Airport, an airport in Kasese District, Uganda.
