= Mweya Airport =

- IATA: none; ICAO: HUMW

Summary
- Airport type: Civilian
- Owner: Queen Elizabeth National Park
- Serves: Mweya, Uganda
- Location: Mweya, Uganda
- Elevation AMSL: 3,200 ft / 980 m
- Coordinates: 00°11′39″S 029°53′38″E
- Interactive map of Mweya Airport

Runways
Direction	Length		Surface
Direction	ft	m	Surface
06/24	4,120	1,255	Grass
- Source: Google Maps

Mweya Airport (ICAO: HUMW) is a small civilian airport in Uganda. It is one of the 46 airports in the country.

== Location ==
Mweya Airport is located in Mweya, Kasese District, in western Uganda, approximately 283 kilometres (176 mi), by air, west of Entebbe International Airport, the country's largest civilian and military airport.

== Overview ==
Mweya Airport serves the area of Mweya and the neighboring areas of Queen Elizabeth National Park and the Lake Katwe Explosion Crater. As of January 2010, the airport was not under the administration of the Uganda Civil Aviation Authority. Mweya Airport receives daily flights from Murchison Falls National Park, Entebbe International Airport and Kajjansi Airfield, which are frequently used by tourists to visit Queen Elizabeth National Park.

== Airlines and destinations ==
Airlines	Destinations
Aerolink Uganda	Entebbe

== See also ==
- List of airports in Uganda
