= Pakuba Airfield =

Airfield in Uganda

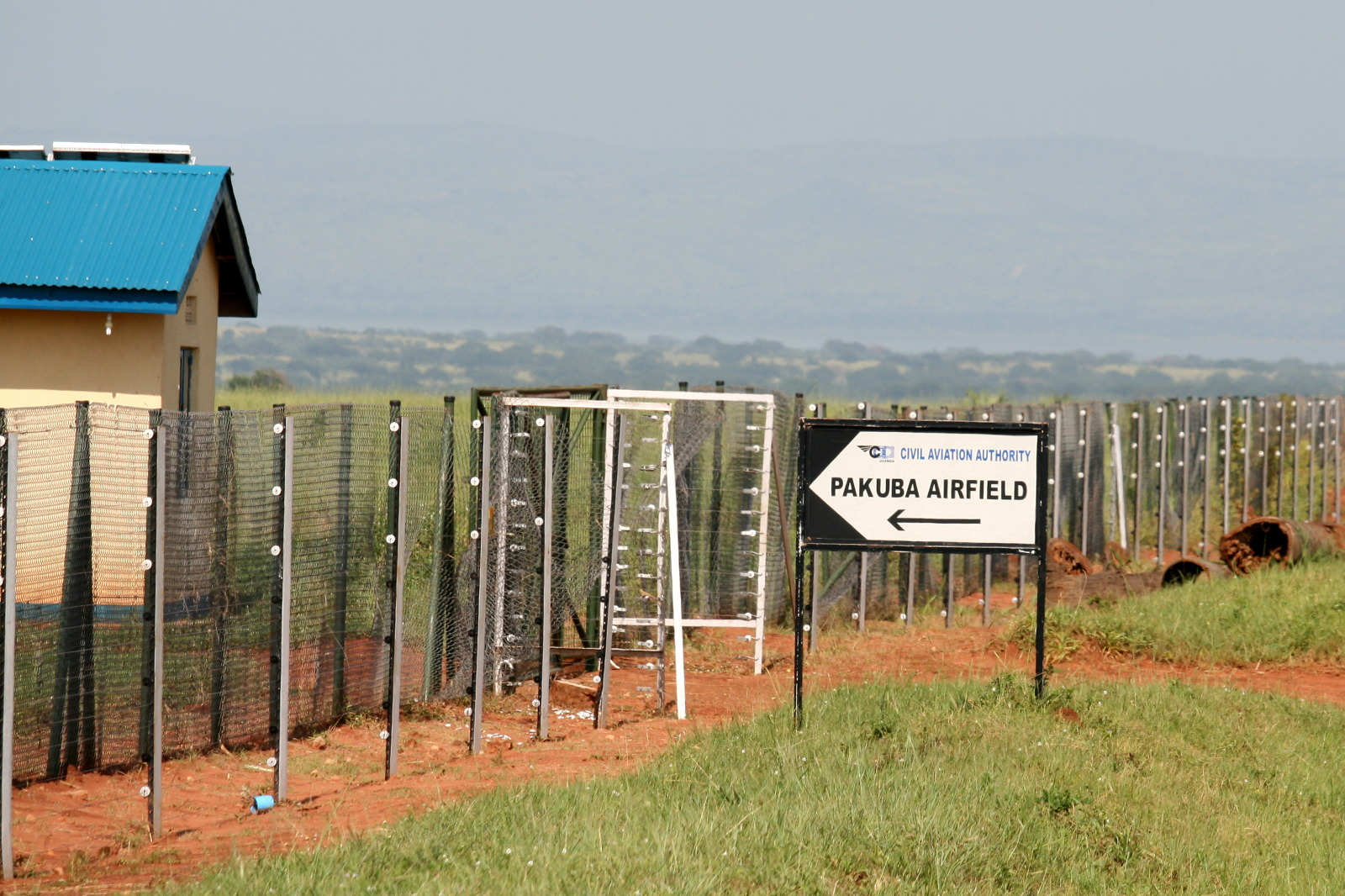
- Pakuba Airfield
- IATA: PAF; ICAO: HUPA

Summary
- Airport type: Public
- Owner: Civil Aviation Authority of Uganda
- Serves: Pakuba, Uganda
- Elevation AMSL: 2,365 ft (721 m)
- Coordinates: 02°20′00″N 031°30′00″E

Map
- Location of Pakuba Airport in Uganda

Runways
Direction	Length		Surface
Direction	ft	m	Surface
07/25	5,770	1,760	Murram
- Sources: Uganda CAA GCM

Pakuba Airfield (IATA: PAF, ICAO: HUPA) is an airfield serving Pakuba and Murchison Falls National Park in the Nwoya District of northern Uganda.

The airport is operated by the Civil Aviation Authority of Uganda. It is one of the five upcountry airports that are authorized to handle cross-border air traffic from member countries of the East African Community, as part of efforts to promote tourism within eastern Africa. Pakuba Airfield receives daily domestic flights from Entebbe International Airport and Kajjansi Airfield, which are primarily used by tourists to visit Murchison Falls National Park, and connect to Kidepo Valley National Park and Queen Elizabeth National Park.

== Location ==
Pakuba Airfield is approximately 275 kilometres (171 mi) by air north-west of Entebbe International Airport, the country's largest civilian and military airport.

It is 15 kilometres (9 mi) north-west of Bugungu Airstrip and 72 kilometres (45 mi) west of Chobe Safari Lodge Airport, which are also within Murchison Falls National Park.

== Cartographic misdesignation ==
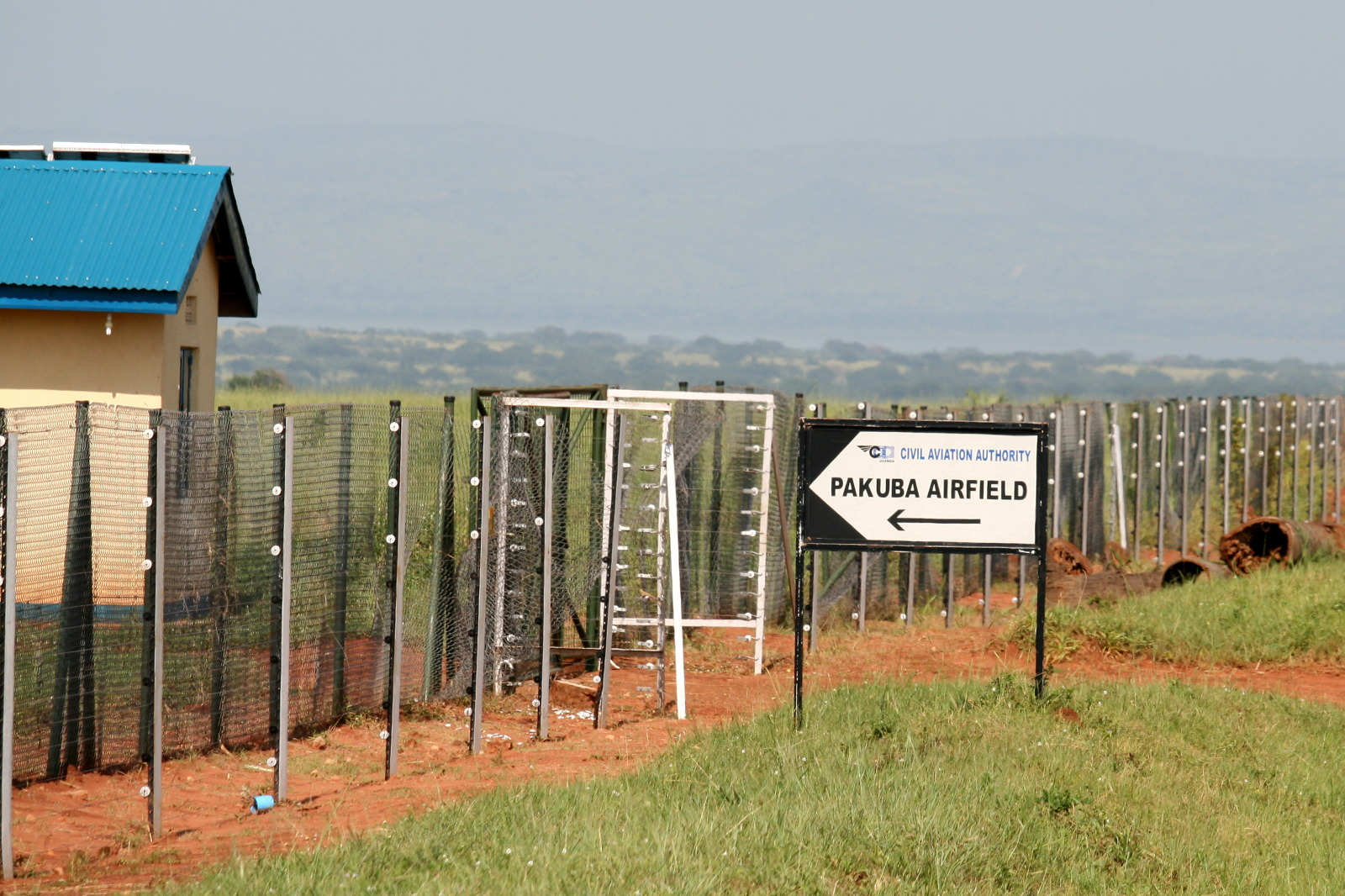

On a considerable number of cartographic materials (including Wikimapia, Google Maps, and others) Pakuba Airfield is incorrectly denoted as "Kabalega Falls Airport". "Kabalega Falls" is a now-disused designation for "Murchison Falls."

== Airlines and destinations ==
Airlines	Destinations
Aerolink Uganda	Entebbe

== See also ==
- List of airports in Uganda
- Transport in Uganda
