= HUTO =

HUTO or Huto may refer to:

- The Huto and Kamarband Caves, archaeological sites in Iran
- HUTO, the ICAO code of Tororo Airport, located in Uganda
- The Heart of the Universe, a fictional energy source in the Marvel Universe
