= Moroto Airport =

Airport in Uganda

- IATA: none; ICAO: HUMO

Summary
- Airport type: Public
- Serves: Moroto
- Elevation AMSL: 4,200 ft / 1,280 m
- Coordinates: 2°30′15″N 34°35′45″E

Map
- Location of the airport in Uganda

Runways
Direction	Length		Surface
Direction	m	ft	Surface
13/31	1,610	5,280	Murram
- Sources: Uganda CAA Google Maps

Moroto Airport (ICAO: HUMO) is an airport serving Moroto in the Northern Region of Uganda. It is one of twelve upcountry airports managed by the Civil Aviation Authority of Uganda.

The well-marked runway is just south of the Pader Palwo - Moroto road, 8 kilometres (5.0 mi) west of Moroto.

== See also ==
- Transport in Uganda
- List of airports in Uganda
