= Moroto =

Moroto may refer to:

- Moroto District in north-eastern Uganda
- Moroto Town in Moroto District, Uganda
  - Moroto Airport
- Mount Moroto in Moroto District, Uganda
- Moroto County in Alebtong District, Uganda

== People with the surname ==
- Samuel Moroto (born 1960), Kenyan politician
