= Matany Airstrip =

- IATA: none; ICAO: none

Summary
- Airport type: Public
- Owner/Operator: St. Kizito Hospital Matany
- Serves: Matany
- Elevation AMSL: 3,895 ft / 1,187 m
- Coordinates: 2°26′58″N 34°23′45″E

Map
- Location of the airport in Uganda

Runways
Direction	Length		Surface
Direction	m	ft	Surface
08/26	960	3,150	Dirt
- Sources: Google Maps

Matany Airstrip is an airport serving Matany in Moroto District, Uganda. The airport is maintained by Matany Hospital, a private hospital belonging to the Catholic Diocese of Moroto and serving the wider region.

== See also ==
- Transport in Uganda
- List of airports in Uganda
