= List of airports in Uganda =

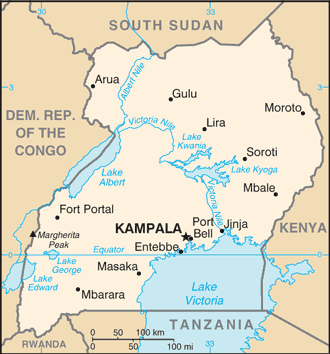
Map of Uganda

This is a list of airports in Uganda, sorted by location.

Uganda is a landlocked country in East Africa. It is bordered on the east by Kenya, on the north by South Sudan, on the west by the Democratic Republic of the Congo, on the southwest by Rwanda, and on the south by Tanzania. The southern part of the country includes a substantial portion of Lake Victoria, which is also bordered by Kenya and Tanzania. Uganda's capital and largest city is Kampala.

== Airports ==
Names shown in bold indicate the airport has scheduled passenger service on commercial airlines. These include Entebbe International Airport, plus three domestic airports where Kampala-based Eagle Air provides service: Arua Airport, Gulu Airport, and Moyo Airport.

| City served | Region | ICAO | IATA | Airport | Coordinates | Elev. (m) | Rwy. (m) | Surface |
|---|---|---|---|---|---|---|---|---|
| Adjumani | Northern | HUAJ | | Adjumani Airport | 03°20′21″N 31°45′53″E | 796 | 1,131 | Unpaved |
| Arua | Northern | HUAR | RUA | **Arua Airport** | 03°02′50″N 30°54′44″E | 1,204 | 1,707 | Unpaved |
| Bugungu | Western | HUGG | | Bugungu Airstrip | 02°12′10″N 31°33′16″E | 753 | 1,540 | Unpaved |
| Bundibugyo | Western | HUBU | | Bundibugyo Airport | 00°40′15″N 30°01′35″E | 3100 | 965 | Grass |
| Entebbe | Central | HUEN | EBB | **Entebbe International Airport** | 00°02′33″N 32°26′37″E | 1,153 | 3,658; 2,408 | Asphalt; Asphalt |
| Fort Portal | Western | HUFP | | Fort Portal Airport | 00°42′32″N 30°14′53″E | 1,530 | 850 | Unpaved |
| Gulu | Northern | HUGU | ULU | **Gulu Airport** | 02°48′20″N 32°16′18″E | 1,070 | 3,144 | Asphalt |
| Hoima | Western | n/a | n/a | Kabalega International Airport | 01°25′39″N 31°04′40″E | 1,070 | 3,500 | Asphalt |
| Jinja | Eastern | HUJI | JIN | **Jinja Airport** | 00°27′11″N 33°11′34″E | 1,175 | 1,800 | Unpaved |
| Kabale | Western | HUKB | | Kabale Airport | 01°13′34″S 29°57′36″E | 1,820 | 2,408 | Unpaved |
| Kajjansi | Central | HUKJ | KJJ | Kajjansi Airfield | 00°11′48″N 32°33′09″E | 1,180 | 1,100 | Unpaved |
| Kakira | Eastern | HUKK | | Kakira Airport | 00°29′56″N 33°16′57″E | 1,200 | 1,278 | Asphalt |
| Kasenyi | Western | HULA | | Kasenyi Airport | | 930 | | Unpaved |
| Kasese | Western | HUKS | KSE | **Kasese Airport** | 00°10′59″N 30°06′05″E | 959 | 1,570 | Unpaved |
| Kidepo | Northern | HUKD | | Kidepo Airport | 03°43′09″N 33°45′15″E | 1,190 | 1,280 | Unpaved |
| Kihihi | Western | | KHX | Savannah Airstrip | 00°43′10″S 29°42′00″E | 1,100 | 2,000 | Gravel |
| Kisoro | Western | HUKI | KXO | **Kisoro Airport** | 01°16′48″S 29°43′09″E | 1,890 | 1,300 | Asphalt |
| Kitgum | Northern | HUKT | | Kitgum Airport | 03°16′43″N 32°53′24″E | 929 | 1,900 | Unpaved |
| Kotido | Northern | HUKO | | Kotido Airport | 02°57′6″N 34°7′21″E | 1,180 | 1,600 | Unpaved |
| Lira | Northern | HULI | | Lira Airport | 02°14′52″N 32°54′35″E | 1,091 | 846 | Unpaved |
| Masindi | Western | HUMI | KCU | Masindi Airport | 01°45′29″N 31°44′12″E | 1,173 | 2,042 | Unpaved |
| Matany | Northern | | | Matany Airstrip | 2°26′58″N 34°23′45″E | 3895 | 960 | Dirt |
| Mbarara | Western | HUMA | MBQ | Mbarara Airport (Nyakisharara International Airport) | 00°33′19″S 30°35′58″E | 1,402 | 1,635 | Unpaved |
| Moroto | Northern | HUMO | | Moroto Airport | 02°30′18″N 34°35′41″E | 1,280 | 1,500 | Unpaved |
| Moyo | Northern | | OYG | **Moyo Airport** | 03°38′57″N 31°45′54″E | 980 | 1,160 | Unpaved |
| Murchison Falls National Park | Northern | HUGG | | Bugungu Airstrip | 02°12′08″N 31°33′16″E | | | Unpaved |
| Murchison Falls National Park | Northern | | | Chobe Safari Lodge Airport | 02°14′25″N 32°08′30″E | 3140 | 1,555 | Gravel |
| Mutukula | Central | | | Mutukula Airport | 00°55′30″S 31°27′00″E | 1,190 | 2,700 | Unpaved |
| Mweya | Western | HUMW | | Mweya Airport | 00°11′34″S 29°53′45″E | 980 | 1,254 | Unpaved |
| Nakasongola | Central | | | Nakasongola Airport | 01°25′12″N 32°28′12″E | 1,100 | 3,000 | Asphalt |
| Namulonge | Central | HUNA | | Namulonge Airport | 00°30′51″N 32°37′48″E | 1,180 | 560 | Unpaved |
| Nebbi | Northern | | | Nebbi Airport | 02°30′49″N 31°07′57″E | 900 | | Unpaved |
| Patongo | Northern | | | Patongo Airfield | 02°45'43"N 33°19'02"E | 1,027 | 1,200 | Unpaved |
| Murchison Falls National Park | Northern | HUPA | PAF | Pakuba Airfield | 02°19′35″N 31°29′52″E | 721 | 1,760 | Unpaved |
| Queen Elizabeth National Park | Western | | | Ishasha River Camp Airport | 0°36′50″S 29°39′55″E | 3,140 | 1,006 | Gravel |
| Soroti | Eastern | HUSO | SRT | **Soroti Airport** | 01°43′39″N 33°37′22″E | 1,110 | 1,900; 770 | Asphalt; Asphalt |
| Tororo | Eastern | HUTO | TRY | Tororo Airport | 00°40′48″N 34°10′05″E | 1,170 | 1,707 | Unpaved |

== See also ==
- Transport in Uganda
- List of airports by ICAO code: H#HU - Uganda
- Wikipedia: WikiProject Aviation/Airline destination lists: Africa#Uganda
