= KHX =

KHX, KHx, or khx may refer to:

- Kingdom Hearts χ, Japanese role-playing browser game
- Knighthawk Express, U.S. airline; see List of airline codes
- Lega language, Bantu language of the Democratic Republic of the Congo
- Savannah Airstrip, an airstrip in Kihihi, Uganda
