= Stabo Air =

Zambian cargo airline

| IATA | ICAO | Call sign |
|---|---|---|
| 4E | SBO | STABAIR |
- Founded: 1994
- Commenced operations: 1994
- Hubs: Lusaka International Airport
- Headquarters: Lusaka, Zambia
- Website: Airline website

Stabo Air is a privately owned cargo airline based in Lusaka, Zambia, operating from Lusaka International Airport. The company offers scheduled flights to Western Europe, East Africa and Southern Africa.

== Destinations ==
As of January 2020 Stabo Air operates scheduled flights to the following destinations.

| Country | City | Airport | Notes | Refs |
|---|---|---|---|---|
| Belgium | Liège City | Liège Airport | | |
| Uganda | Entebbe | Entebbe International Airport | | |
| Zambia | Lusaka | Lusaka International Airport | Hub | |
| South Africa | Johannesburg | O. R. Tambo International Airport | | |

In addition to scheduled flights, the airline offers charter cargo flights to many parts of the world, mostly to destinations in sub-Saharan Africa.

== Fleet ==
Stabo Air fleet consists of the following aircraft (as of January 2020):

Stabo Air Fleet
| Aircraft | In Service |
|---|---|
| Boeing 747-8 |
| McDonnell Douglas MD-11 |
| Boeing 757 |
| Total |
