= Chobe Safari Lodge Airport =

Airport in Uganda

- IATA: none; ICAO: none

Summary
- Airport type: Public
- Serves: Murchison Falls National Park
- Elevation AMSL: 3,140 ft / 957 m
- Coordinates: 2°14′31″N 32°08′13″E

Map
- Location of the airport in Uganda

Runways
Direction	Length		Surface
Direction	ft	m	Surface
11/29	5,100	1,555	Gravel

Chobe Safari Lodge Airport is an airport serving Murchison Falls National Park in Uganda. The runway is adjacent to the Chobe Safari Lodge, and alongside the rapids of the Nile River.

== Location ==
The airport is located within the confines of Murchison Falls National Park approximately 247 km (153 mi), by air, north-west of Entebbe International Airport, Uganda's largest civilian and military airport.

According to available maps at Google Maps, the airport terminal is located in Kiryandongo District, in the Western Region of Uganda. The airport's runway stretches south-eastwards into Nwoya District, in the Northern Region of Uganda. The geographical coordinates of Chobe Safari Lodge Airport are:2°14'31.0"N, 32°08'13.0"E (Latitude:2.241944; Longitude:32.136944). The airport lies at an elevation of 957 m (3,140 ft) above sea level.

== Overview ==
The airport serves visitors to Murchison Falls National Park and those visiting Chobe Safari Lodge that lies adjacent to the airport's single murrum runway that measures 1,555 meters (5,100 ft).

== Airlines and destinations ==
Airlines	Destinations
Aerolink Uganda	Entebbe

== See also ==
- Transport in Uganda
- List of airports in Uganda
