= Pakuba =

- Location in Uganda
- Coordinates: 02°20′06″N 31°28′12″E
- Country: Uganda
- Region: Northern Uganda
- Sub-region: Acholi sub-region
- District: Nwoya District
- Elevation: 2,560 ft (780 m)

Pakuba is a location in Northern Uganda.

== Location ==
Pakuba is located in Nwoya District, Acholi sub-region, in Northern Uganda. It is situated in Murchison Falls National Park. This location lies approximately 19 kilometres (12 mi), by road, south of Pakwach, and approximately 95 kilometres (59 mi), by road, northwest of Masindi Pakuba is located approximately 275 kilometres (171 mi), by airplane, from Entebbe International Airport. The coordinates of Pakuba are:02 20 06N, 31 28 12E (Latitude:2.3350; Longitude:31.4700).

== Overview ==
Pakuba is situated on the eastern bank of the Albert Nile, as the river leaves Lake Albert on its way out of Uganda and into Southern Sudan. During the 1960s, Pakuba was the location of Pakuba Lodge, then a member of the now defunct Uganda Hotels chain. During the 1970s Idi Amin turned the lodge into a State Lodge, for his personal use and enjoyment, as the President of Uganda. Over the years, since his ouster from power in 1979, the facilities went into disrepair. The property is now managed by the Uganda Wildlife Authority and is undergoing renovations. It is expected to re-open for the use of the touring public in 2010.

In 2009, oil exploration in the region around Pakuba, has resulted in oil strikes. The commercial viability of the oil discoveries and how commercial exploitation of those discoveries will balance with the conservation interests are yet to be worked out.

== Landmarks ==
The landmarks within or near Pakuba include:

- Pakuba Safari Lodge - A private safari lodge, that will become operational in 2010.
- Pakuba Airport - A public airport administered by the Uganda Civil Aviation Authority
- Murchison Falls - The Nile River squeezes through a narrow gorge, only 7 metres (23 ft) wide, then plunges 43 metres (141 ft) to form the falls.

== See also ==
- Pakuba Airport
- Kabalega Falls Airport
- Murchison Falls National Park
- Murchison Falls
- Nwoya District
- Acholi sub-region
- Northern Region, Uganda
