= Pakuba Lodge =

Abandoned safari lodge

Pakuba Safari Lodge

General information
- Location: Murchison Falls National Park, Uganda
- Opening: 1970–1974 (original); 2000s (reopened as safari lodge)

Design and construction
- Architect: Hans Munk Hansen

Other information
- Number of rooms: 46
- Number of restaurants: 1
- Number of bars: 1
- Facilities: Swimming pool, restaurant, bar, conference room, game drives, boat cruises

Website
- pakubasafarilodge.com

Pakuba Lodge is a safari lodge in the Pakuba district of Murchison Falls National Park in Uganda. It was built by architect Hans Munk Hansen in 1970–74 and initially operated as part of the Uganda Hotels chain. It was then taken over by the Ugandan government as a personal lodge for the dictator, Idi Amin. It then fell into disuse in the fighting which followed his overthrow and is now dilapidated. Many wild animals now frequent the ruins, including hyena, leopard, lion and warthog, and they are remarkably peaceful as they occupy the facility together. A new lodge is operating at the former staff quarters nearby and there are plans to revive and renovate the main building too.
