= Ugandan space initiatives =

Proposed national space programs

The development of Ugandan space initiatives has been largely shaped by that country's position on the equator. Its history is marked by an early involvement in issues of space law, and in 2022 by the launch of its first satellite, PearlAfricaSat-1.

== Conditions ==
As one of only a handful of equatorial states, Uganda is ideally sited for a spaceport to launch satellites into geostationary orbit, but this option has never been pursued because of lack of investment in the country's project. The closest regional facility, and the only one ever active in East Africa, is the Italian-owned Broglio Space Centre located off the coast of neighboring Kenya.

Uganda has never acquired any ballistic missile capability, the usual precursor to booster development. The only state in sub-Saharan Africa to ever do so was South Africa, which developed the RSA-3 and RSA-4 missiles in the 1980s, but, after the end of the apartheid regime, cancelled its nuclear weapons and later its ballistic missile programs by 1993.

== Space law ==
Uganda joined the first two international space law treaties, ratifying the Partial Nuclear Test Ban Treaty on March 24, 1964, and acceding to the Outer Space Treaty on April 24, 1968. It was not, however, a party to the later Rescue Agreement of 1968, the Liability Convention of 1972, the Registration Convention of 1976 or the Moon Treaty of 1984.

Uganda was one of eight equatorial states that adopted the Bogota Declaration on December 3, 1976, which seemingly contradicted the Outer Space Treaty, but asserted that geostationary orbit was not "outer space" and constitutes national territory.

=== Idi Amin and UFOs ===
When President Idi Amin came to power in a 1971 coup (at the Space Race climax of the Apollo lunar landings), his government developed an interest in UFO activity, and he even claimed to have personally witnessed a UFO over Lake Victoria in 1973. In 1971, at the beginning of his regime, United Nations ambassador Grace Ibingira advocated an early form of post-detection policy to prevent Cold War provocation of hostilities with UFOs. Near the end of the Amin era, Uganda also became the only other country to support Eric Gairy of Grenada's efforts for UN recognition of the phenomenon with a dedicated agency and declaring 1978 as the International Year of UFOs.

There is a false report that Idi Amin also pursued a human spaceflight program, but this may have been a conflation of his UFO interests and the personal project of Edward Makuka Nkoloso in Zambia the decade before. In June 1999, this report got some attention in the Time 100 magazine feature's "100 Worst Ideas of the Century".

== Modern government effort ==
At the September 1996 Conference on Small Satellites: Missions and Technology in Madrid, Spain, informal proposals were raised for a Ugandan microsatellite project. At the Third United Nations Conference on the Exploration and Peaceful Uses of Outer Space held in Vienna in July 1999, Semakula Kiwanuka said "space technology is a powerful tool for accelerating national development" and pointed out the benefits a space program would have for his country. There have also been proposals for space science to be introduced at Mbarara University of Science & Technology.

Space technology for a country like Uganda would be most relevant in the fields of environmental Earth observation satellites and communications. Uganda sent two representatives, Samuel Edward Sekunda of the Department of Meteorology and Yafesi Okia of the Department of Lands and Surveys, to the Regional Workshop on the Use of Space Technology for Outer Space Affairs organized by the United Nations Office for Outer Space Affairs and the United Nations Economic Commission for Africa in Addis Ababa, Ethiopia in July 2002. Joel Arumadri of the National Environmental Management Authority (NEMA) represented Uganda at the April 2004 Regional Workshop on the Use of Space Technology for Natural Resources Management, Environmental Monitoring and Disaster Management in Khartoum, Sudan.

The Department of Meteorology has been directly active in the communications use of space technology, running the Radio and Internet (RANET) program, which allows rural communities to access government internet forecasts through WorldSpace satellite radio from 2001 to 2009.

President Yoweri Museveni has spoken in favor of a regional East African approach to future human spaceflight.

== Amateur effort ==
The African Space Research Program is a private volunteer space advocacy group that has pursued a DIY aviation program, with the goal of simulating and preparing for eventual spaceflight. The team was founded by Chris Nsamba after he collaborated on a homebuilt aircraft project in the United States, and resolved to build the first Ugandan-designed homebuilt (the "African Skyhawk") upon his return. Nsamba believes it will be capable of flying at an altitude of 80,000 ft. The aircraft is being put together, with the help of 600 volunteers, in Nsamba's mother's backyard in Ntinda, a suburb of Kampala.

The group has also built a "Cadimalla Space Observer", for aerial photography, which they plan to send up with a high-altitude balloon. Jinja Airport is planned to be used for these efforts.

Nsamba, had developed ambitious plans for an eventual spaceplane (the "Dynacraft Spaceship") to send to orbit by 2017, and has also taken on the responsibility of training his volunteers, drawing on his background as a student of astronomy. When asked how he would simulate the effects of zero-gravity, Nsamba said: "I've got a jet engine on order, so I'm planning to build a tunnel, put the engine at one end and when I throw a guy in he'll float in a similar way to how he would in space."

The program has been sustained by donations from around the world, and from 2011, funding has also been supplied by the Ugandan government. A spokesman for the Department of Science and Technology said: "I applaud their ambition ... It provides an opportunity for Africans in general and Ugandans in particular to participate in space science and research instead of being spectators." Flight engineers from the Civil Aviation Authority have been assigned to review and advise the team. However, the head of safety at the Civil Aviation Authority subsequently reported to a Parliamentary science committee that all space activities are illegal in Uganda.

== See also ==
- Civil Aviation Authority of Uganda
- Space programme of Kenya
