= Savannah Airstrip =

Airport in Uganda

- IATA: KHX; ICAO: none

Summary
- Airport type: Private
- Owner/Operator: Savannah Resort Hotel
- Serves: Kihihi, Western Region, Uganda
- Elevation AMSL: 1,096 m / 3,595 ft
- Coordinates: 0°43′10″S 29°42′00″E

Map
- Location of the airport in Uganda

Runways
Direction	Length		Surface
Direction	m	ft	Surface
02/20	1,830	6,004	Dirt
- Sources: Google Maps, Savannah Resort

Savannah Airstrip (also known as Kihihi Airstrip) (IATA: KHX) is an airport serving Savannah Resort and the town of Kihihi, Uganda. The airstrip receives daily flights from Entebbe International Airport and Kajjansi Airfield, a route frequently used by tourists to visit the south of Queen Elizabeth National Park and north of Bwindi Impenetrable National Park.

== Airlines and destinations ==
Airlines	Destinations
Aerolink Uganda	Entebbe

== See also ==
- Transport in Uganda
- List of airports in Uganda
