= Jinja Airport =

Airport in Uganda

- IATA: JIN; ICAO: HUJI

Summary
- Airport type: Public/Military
- Owner: Civil Aviation Authority of Uganda
- Serves: Jinja, Uganda
- Elevation AMSL: 3,840 ft (1,170 m)
- Coordinates: 0°27′09″N 33°11′35″E

Map
- Location of airport in Uganda

Runways
| Direction | Length | | Surface |
| Direction | m | ft | Surface |
|---|---|---|---|
| 13/31 | 1,688 | 5,538 | Unpaved |
- Sources: SkyVector Google Maps

Jinja Airport (IATA: JIN, ICAO: HUJI) is a small civilian and military airport in Uganda. It serves the town of Jinja in Jinja District, Busoga, Eastern Region. It is adjacent to the Uganda Senior Command and Staff College of the Uganda People's Defence Force at Kimaka, a suburb of Jinja. It is approximately 95 kilometres (59 mi), by air, east of Entebbe International Airport, the country's largest airport. Jinja Airport is one of 13 upcountry airports that are administered by the Uganda Civil Aviation Authority.

== Airlines and destinations ==
=== Passenger ===
| Airlines | Destinations |
|---|---|
| BAR Aviation | Entebbe |
| Aerolink | Entebbe |

== Vine Air Flight Academy ==
Jinja Airport hosts the Vine Air Flight Academy (VAFA), one of the licensed flight academies in Uganda.

== Developments ==
In April 2024, the New Vision reported that Uganda Civil Aviation Authority had earmarked USh20 billion (US$5.3 million) to improve the tarmacking of the 1,800 metres (5,900 ft) runway, of the taxiway, strengthening and tarmacking of the airport apron. Construction of a modern main entrance to the airport with a dual carriageway road are also included in the planned improvements. The engineering, procurement and construction (EPC) contract now valued at USh23 billion (US$6.27 million) was awarded to a joint venture between Gofar Investment Company and MJ Engineers and Contractors and is being managed and supervised by the Uganda's Ministry of Works and Transport. The work is expected to last 15 months and conclude in the first half of 2026.

== See also ==
- List of airports in Uganda
- List of aviation schools in Uganda
