= Mgahinga Gorilla National Park =

National Park in Uganda

- IUCN category II (national park)
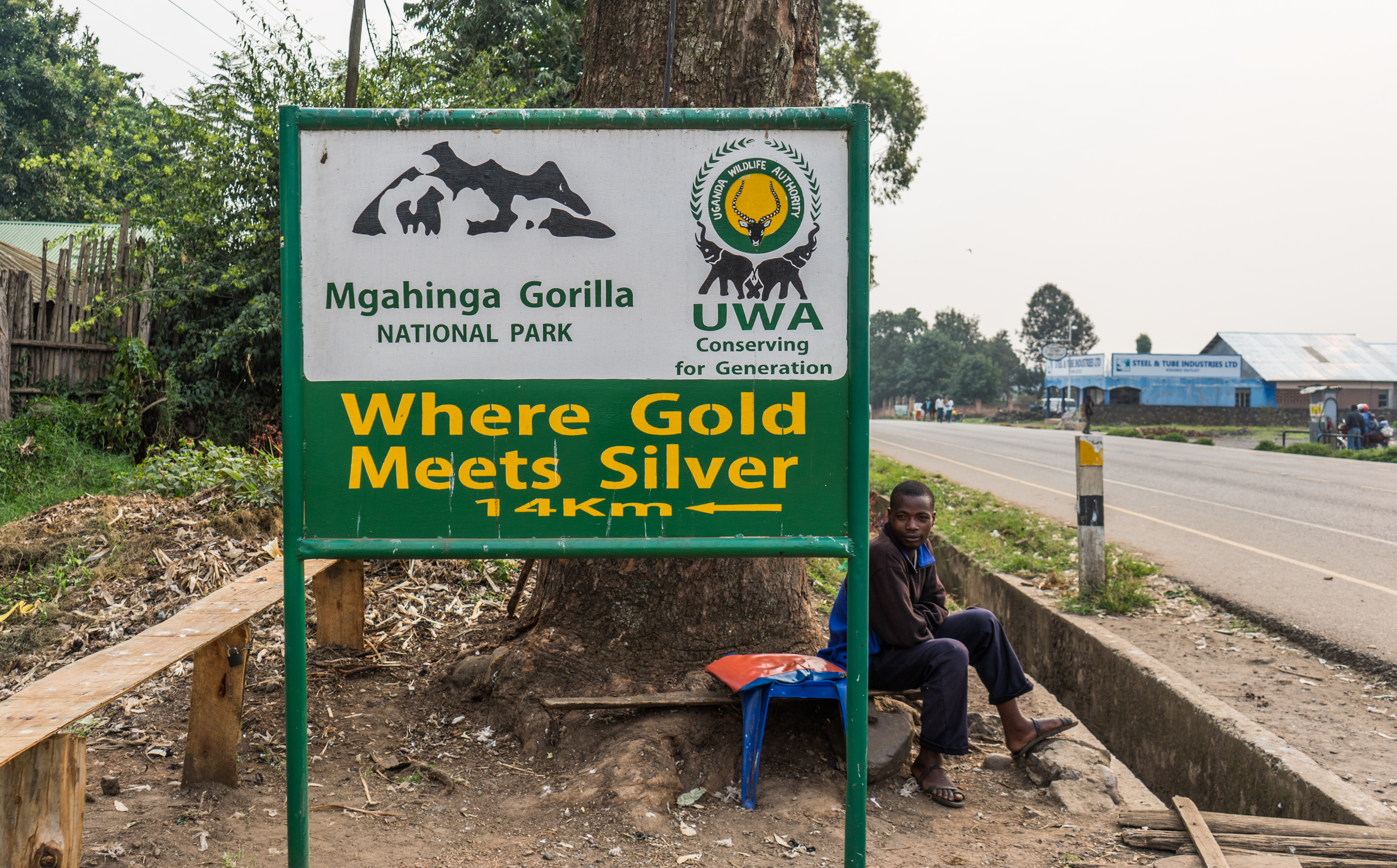

- Location within Uganda
- Location: Kisoro District, Uganda
- Nearest city: Kisoro
- Coordinates: 01°22′10″S 29°38′25″E
- Area: 33.9 km^{2} (13.1 mi^{2})
- Established: 1991
- Governing body: Ugandan Wildlife Authority

Mgahinga Gorilla National Park is a national park in southwestern Uganda. It was created in 1991 and covers an area of 33.9 km^{2} (13.1 sq mi).

== Geography ==
Mgahinga Gorilla National Park is located in the Virunga Mountains and encompasses three inactive volcanoes, namely Mount Muhabura, Mount Gahinga, and Mount Sabyinyo. In altitude the national park ranges from 2,227 to 4,127 m (7,306 to 13,540 ft) and is part of the Nile River watershed area. It is contiguous with Rwanda's Volcanoes National Park and the southern sector of Virunga National Park in the Democratic Republic of the Congo.

The park is about 15 kilometres (9.3 mi) by road south of the town of Kisoro and approximately 55 kilometres (34 mi) by road west of Kabale, the largest city in the sub-region.

=== Climate ===
The area experiences two wet rainy seasons: February to May; and September to December. The average monthly rainfall varies from 250 mm (9.8 in) in October to 10 mm (0.39 in) in July.

== Biodiversity ==
Fauna photographed in Mgahinga Gorilla National Park

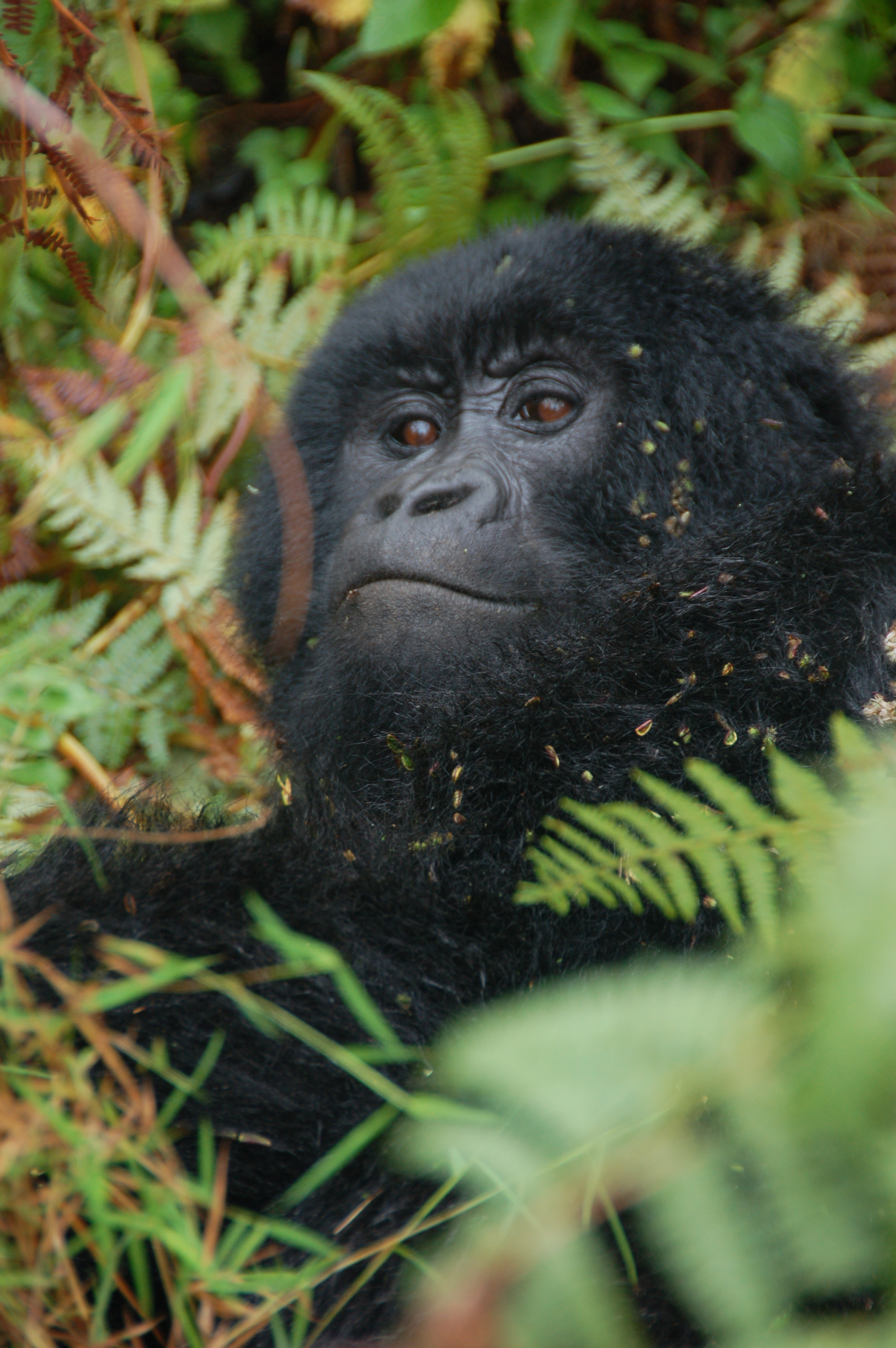
A mountain gorilla

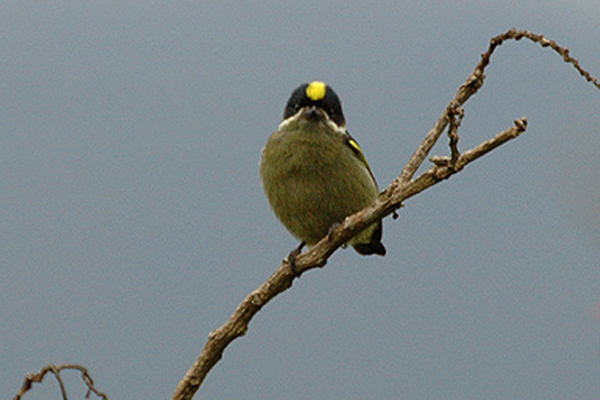
A western tinkerbird

The national park encompasses bamboo forest, Albertine Rift montane forests, Ruwenzori-Virunga montane moorlands with tree heath, and an alpine zone at higher altitudes.

== Wildlife ==
Primates present in the national park include mountain gorilla (Gorilla beringei beringei) with around 30 individuals split between one habituated and two unhabituated groups, and golden monkey (Cercopithecus kandti), an Albertine Rift Endemic whose range is now restricted to the Virungas and one other forest in Rwanda. The checklist of 76 mammal species includes black-and-white colobus, leopard, African bush elephant, giant forest hog, bushpig, buffalo, Cape bushbuck, black-fronted duiker, and several varieties of rodents, bats and small predators.

Of the Albertine Rift's endemic birds, the following were recorded in the national park during surveys in 2004: handsome spurfowl, dusky crimson-wing, red-throated alethe, Kivu ground thrush, Rwenzori turaco, Rwenzori batis, Rwenzori double-collared sunbird, collared apalis, mountain masked apalis, Archer's ground robin, stripe-breasted tit, blue-headed sunbird, regal sunbird, strange weaver, montane nightjar, red-faced woodland warbler and Grauer's swamp warbler.

== History ==
Mgahinga Gorilla National Park was established in 1991 in an area that used to be a game reserve between the 1930s and 1950, but was partly converted to crop fields in lower altitudes. Biological surveys were initiated in 1989, wire traps destroyed, rangers trained and trees planted. Settlers were relocated to areas outside the national park's borders in the early 1990s.

In November 2013, the M23 Movement, a Congolese rebel group, surrendered in the park after being defeated by the Congolese Army in the M23 rebellion.

== See also ==
- List of birds of Uganda
