= Kasenyi, Kasese =

Kasenyi
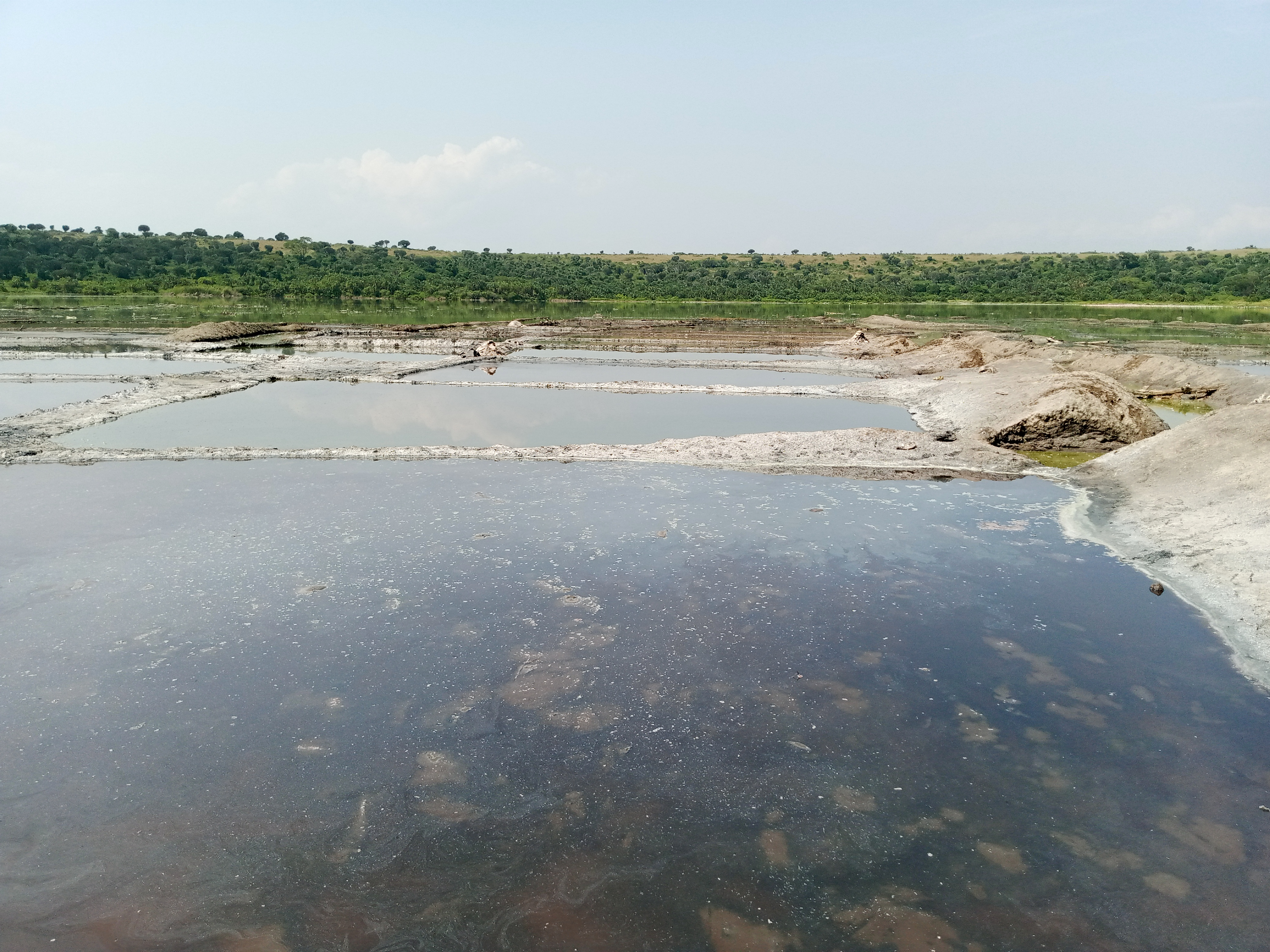
- Kasenyi Plains in Eastern part of Queen Elizabeth National Park

- Location in Uganda
- Coordinates: 00°01′55″S 30°08′55″E
- Country: Uganda
- Region: Western Uganda
- Sub-region: Rwenzururu sub-region
- District: Kasese District
- Elevation: 3,050 ft (930 m)

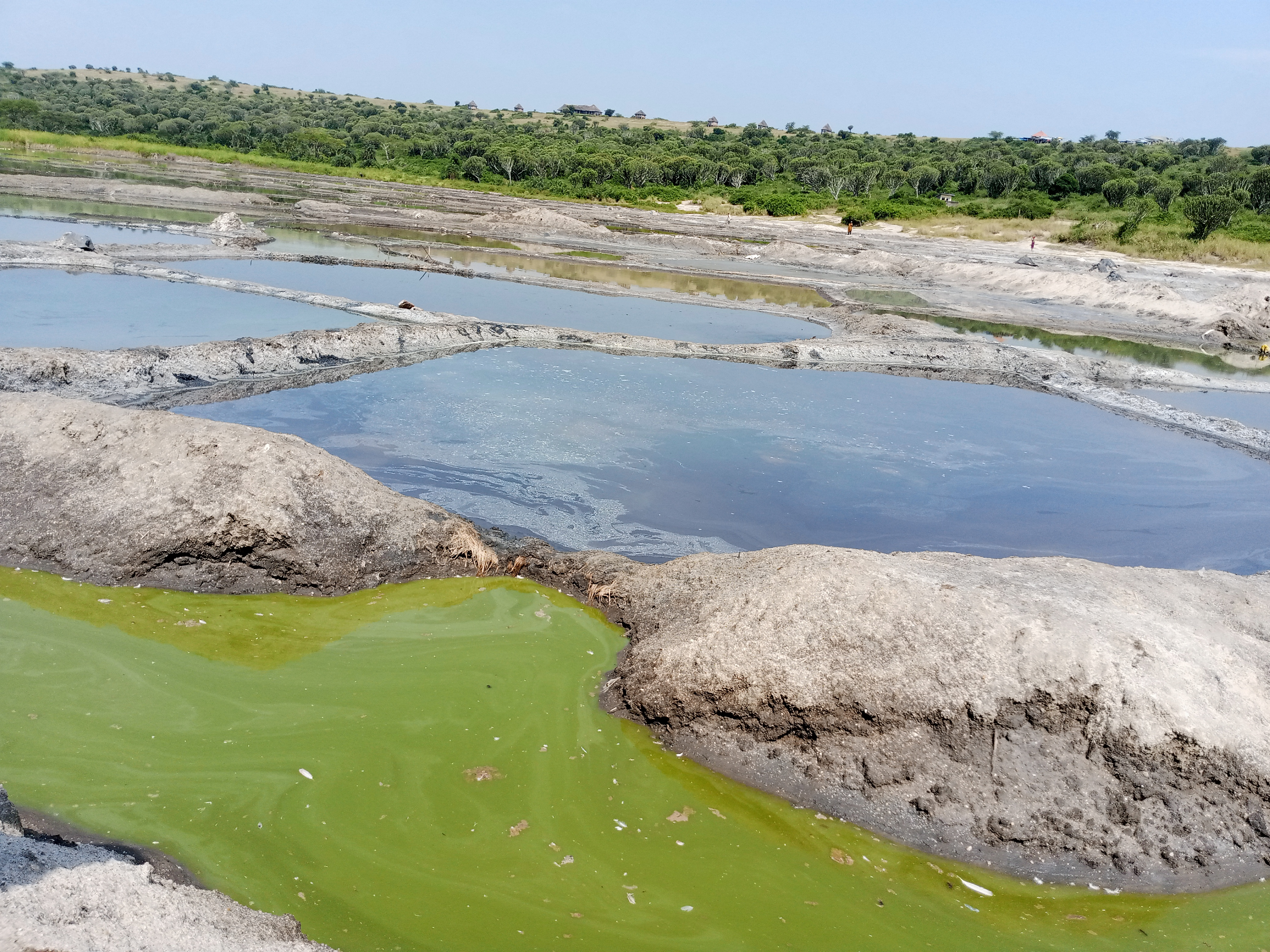
Kasenyi plains in Queen Elizabeth National Park.

Kasenyi is a location in Kasese District, in the Western Region of Uganda.

== Location ==
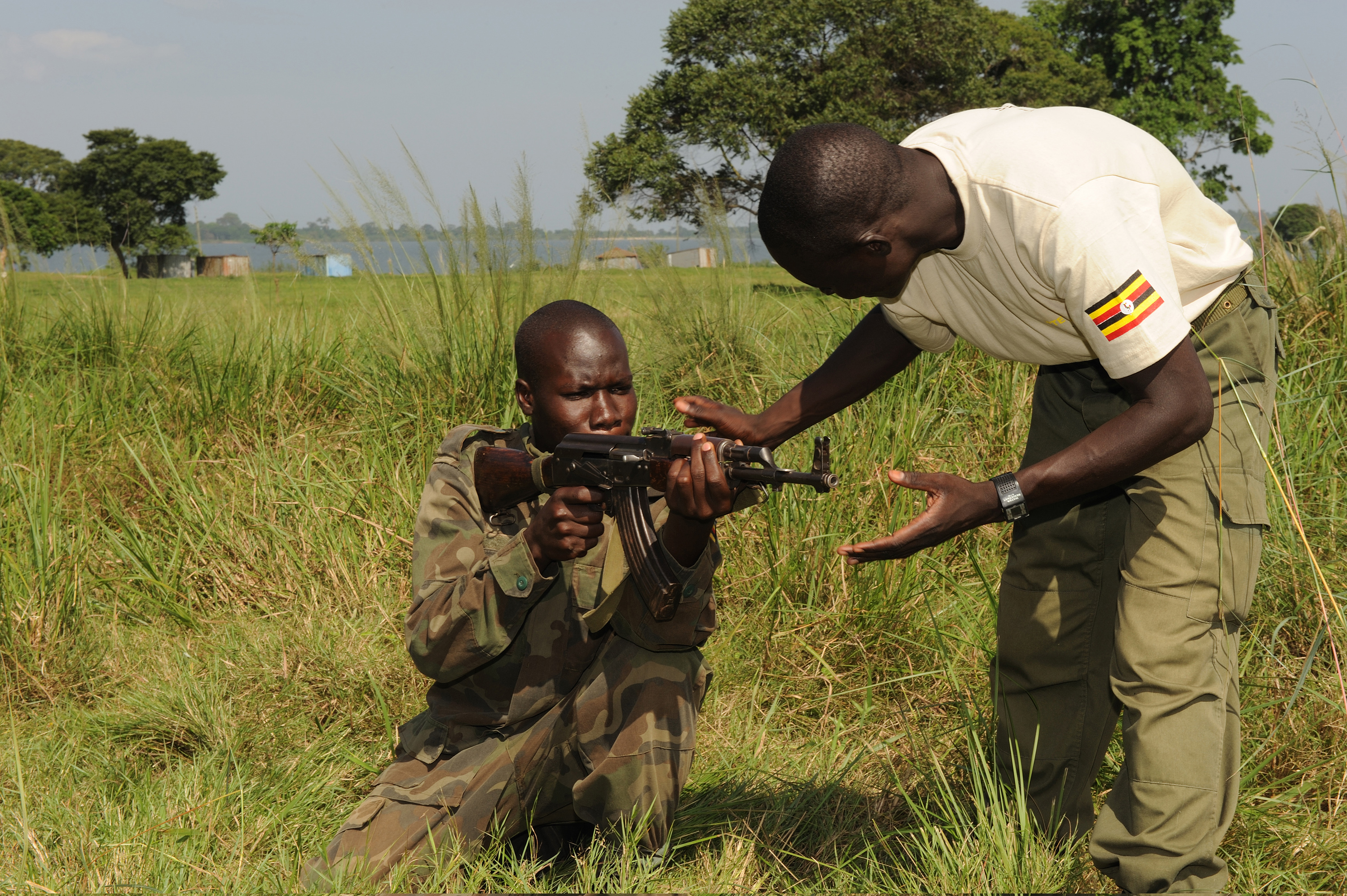
Ugandan troop training at Kasenyi

Kasenyi is in Kasese District of the Rwenzururu sub-region. It lies within Queen Elizabeth National Park, the most visited of Uganda's national parks. Kasenyi is approximately 49 kilometres (30 mi), by road, southeast of Kasese, the district headquarters and the largest town in the sub-region. This is on the western shores of Lake George, close to the point where the Kazinga Channel joins the lake.

== Overview ==
Kasenyi is in the northeastern sector of Queen Elizabeth National Park. This sector is also referred to as the Mweya - Kasenyi Sector in contrast to the Ishasha Sector in the southwestern part of the park. The area around Kasenyi is open savannah, where Uganda Kob are the dominant mammals. Lions are frequently seen here on game drives.

== Points of interest ==
The following additional points of interest lie inside or near Kasenyi:

- Kasenyi Airport, a civilian airport located at Kasenyi
- Kazinga Channel, a fresh waterway connecting Lake George and Lake Edward, 34 kilometres (21 mi) to the southwest of Kasenyi.
- Lake George, a freshwater lake in the Western Rift Valley and entirely within Queen Elizabeth National Park
