= Kisoro =

Kisoro Gisoro
- Location in Uganda
- Coordinates: 01°17′06″S 29°41′06″E
- Country: Uganda
- Region: Western Region of Uganda
- Sub-region: Kigezi sub-region
- District: Kisoro District

Government
  - Chairman LC5: Bizimana Abel
- Elevation: 6,329 ft (1,929 m)

Population (2014 Census)
  - Total: 17,561
- Time zone: East Africa Time
- Climate: Cfb
- Website: https://kisoro.go.ug/

Kisoro is a town in the Western Region of Uganda. It is the chief town of Kisoro District and the site of the district headquarters.

== Location ==
Kisoro is approximately 76 kilometres (47 mi) west of Kabale, the largest city in the Kigezi sub-region. This is approximately 484 kilometres (301 mi), by road, southwest of Kampala, the capital of Uganda and the country's largest city. Kisoro is east of Rumangabo and the Virunga Mountains in the Democratic Republic of the Congo (DRC). The geographical coordinates of Kisoro are 1°17'06.0"S, 29°41'06.0"E (Latitude:-1.2850; Longitude:29.6850). Kisoro Town Council sits at an average elevation of 1,929 metres (6,329 ft), above mean sea level.

== Overview ==
Kisoro is located under the peaks of the Mufumbiro Mountains, which are part of the Virunga Mountains and home to rare mountain gorillas. The area boasts of mountain scenery, Lake Mutanda, colorful markets, and volcano trekking. It is the nearest town to the Mgahinga Gorilla National Park and is an access town for those traveling to Rwanda or the DRC for gorilla tracking in the Volcanoes National Park or the Virunga National Park.

== Population ==
The 2002 national census estimated the population of Kisoro at 11,330. The Uganda Bureau of Statistics (UBOS) estimated the population at 12,700 in 2010. In 2011, UBOS estimated the mid-year population at 12,900. In 2014, the national population census estimated the population at 17,561.

== Points of interest ==
The following additional points of interest are located within the town limits or near its edges:

- offices of Kisoro Town Council
- Kisoro central market
- Kisoro Airport, administered by the Civil Aviation Authority of Uganda
- Kisoro District Hospital, a 160-bed public hospital administered by the Uganda Ministry of Health
- Lake Mutanda, located approximately 20 kilometres (12 mi), by road, north of Kisoro.
- Bwindi Impenetrable National Park, for viewing mountain gorillas
- Voice of Muhabura a local radio station that broadcasts on 88.9 FM. The radio streams live at Vomuhabura Online in Rufumbira (a local dialect synonymous to Kinyarwanda), Rukiga, English and Swahili. It serves over 6 million people.

== Photos ==
- Photo of downtown Kisoro
- Panoramic View of Kisoro Town
- Another View of Kisoro

== See also ==
- Bunagana, Uganda
- Kigezi
- List of cities and towns in Uganda
