= Transport in Uganda =

Transport in Uganda refers to the transportation structure in Uganda. The country has an extensive network of paved and unpaved roads.

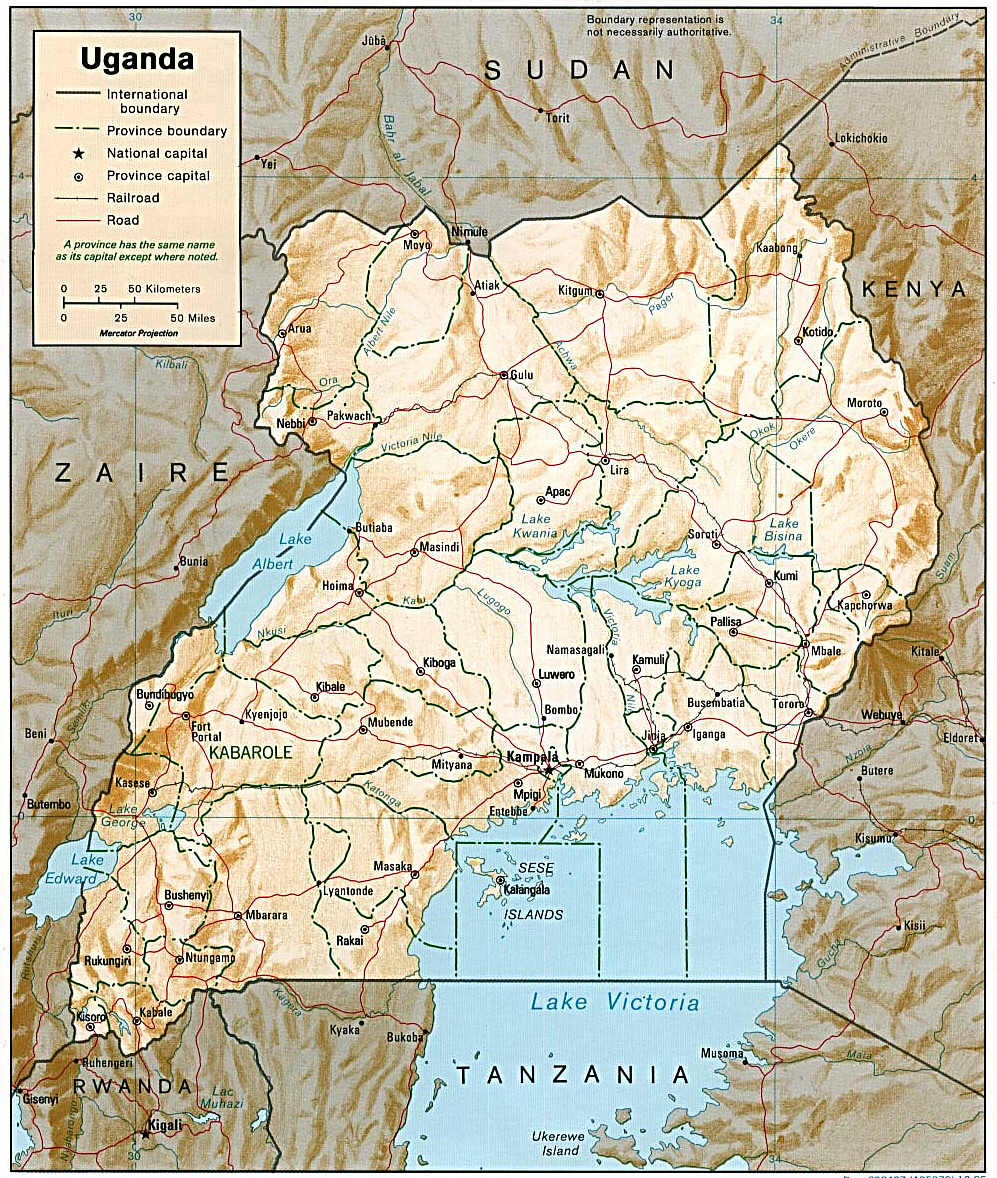
A map of Uganda showing main roads as of 2014

== Roadways ==
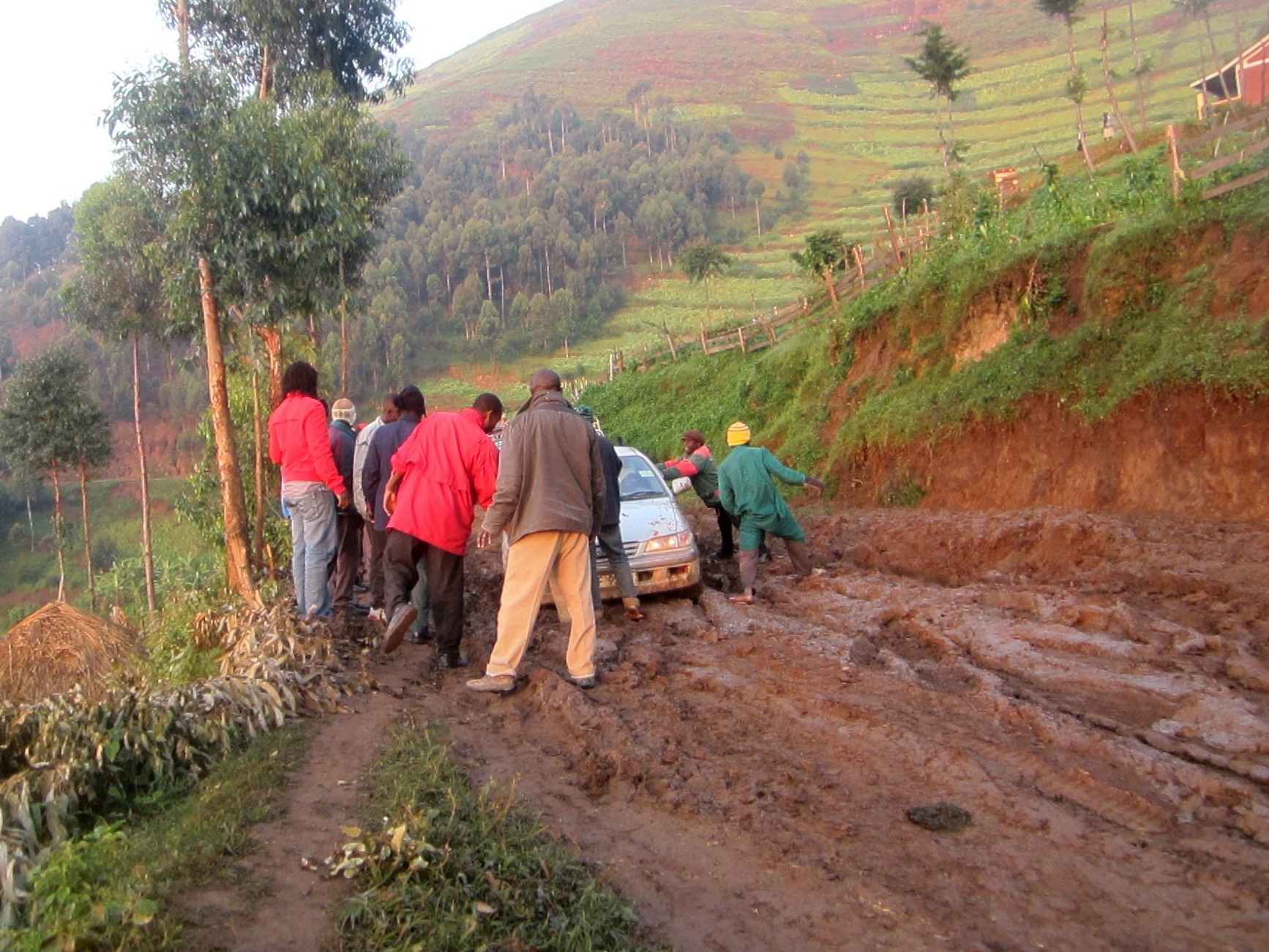
Stuck vehicle in Southern Uganda

As of 2017, according to the Uganda Ministry of Works and Transport, Uganda had about 130,000 kilometres (80,778 mi) of roads, with approximately 5,300 kilometres (3,293 mi) (4 percent) paved. Most paved roads radiate from Kampala, the country's capital and largest city.

=== International highways ===
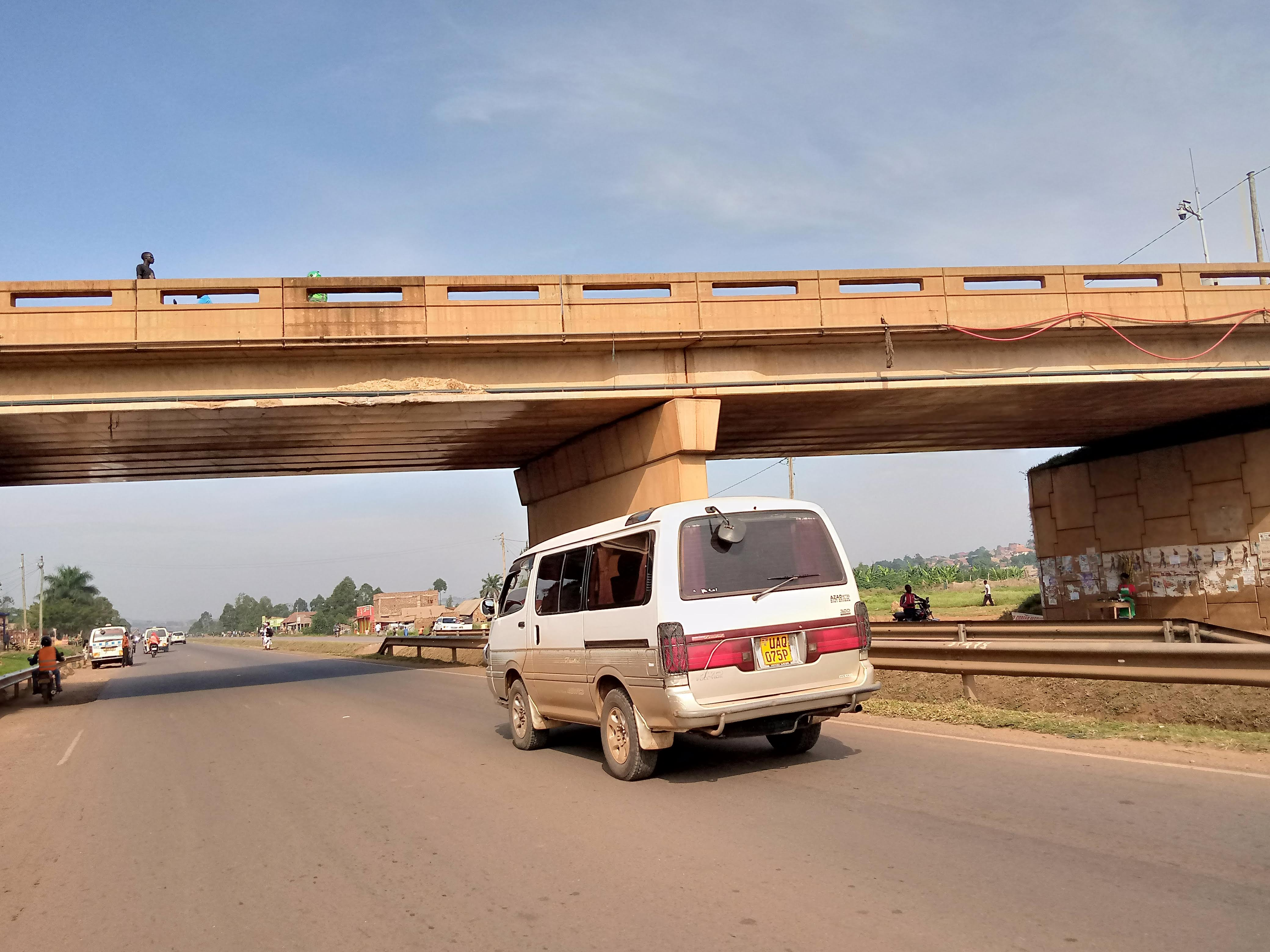
Northern bypass in Kampala

The Lagos-Mombasa Highway, part of the Trans-Africa Highway and aiming to link East Africa and West Africa, passes through Uganda. This is complete only eastwards from the Uganda–DR Congo border to Mombasa, linking the African Great Lakes region to the sea. In East Africa, this roadway is part of the Northern Corridor.

It cannot be used to reach West Africa because the route westwards across DR Congo to Bangui in the Central African Republic (CAR) is impassable after the Second Congo War and requires reconstruction. An alternative route (not part of the Trans-African network) to Bangui based on gravel roads and earth roads runs from Gulu in northern Uganda via Nimule and Juba, South Sudan and Obo in south-east CAR. This is used by trucks but sections are impassable after rain.

The route has been closed at times during war and conflict in northern Uganda (the Lord's Resistance Army rebellion) and South Sudan, but up to July 2007 had not been affected by the Darfur conflict and was the only usable road between East and West Africa. The security situation should be checked with authorities in northern Uganda, South Sudan and south-eastern CAR before use.

== Railways ==
As of 2017, Uganda's railway network measures about 1,250 kilometres (777 mi) in length. Of this, about 56% (700 kilometres (435 mi)), is operational. All existing railway is metre gauge. A new standard gauge rail network is planned.

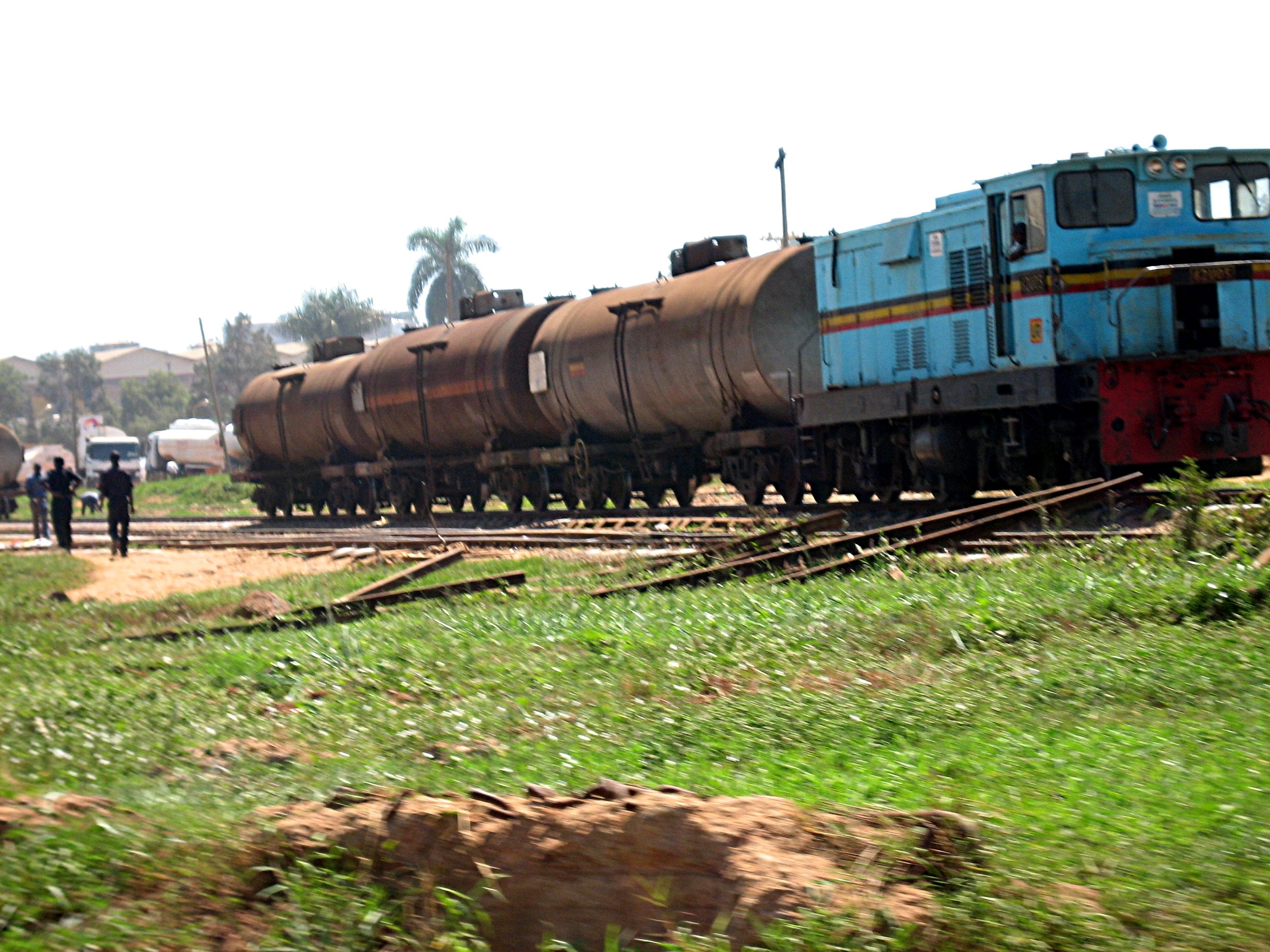
Uganda Railway

A railroad originating at Mombasa on the Indian Ocean connects with Tororo, where it branches westward to Jinja, Kampala, and Kasese and northward to Mbale, Soroti, Lira, Gulu, and Pakwach. The only railway line still operating, however, is the Malaba–Kampala line.

=== Railway links with neighboring countries ===
- Kenya: Yes; same gauge 1,000 mm (3 ft 3 3/8 in)
- South Sudan: Proposed; break of gauge 1,000 mm (3 ft 3 3/8 in)/1,067 mm (3 ft 6 in)
- Democratic Republic of the Congo: No; break of gauge 1,000 mm (3 ft 3 3/8 in)/1,067 mm (3 ft 6 in)
- Rwanda: No; Does not yet have railways
- Tanzania: No direct connection except via train ferry; same gauge 1,000 mm (3 ft 3 3/8 in)

=== Couplings and brakes ===
- Couplings : Meatchopper (Norwegian)
- Brakes : Air
- Standards

=== Plans ===
==== Standard Gauge Railway ====
The six countries of the East African Community are in the process of constructing railway lines with 1,435 mm (4 ft 8 1/2 in) standard gauge tracks. Kenya had, by June 2018, completed the construction of the Mombasa–Nairobi section of its Standard Gauge Railway (SGR), which cost US$4.47 billion (original budget was US$3.2 billion), borrowed from the Exim Bank of China. The country now plans to extend he SGR line to Nakuru, Kisumu and Malaba, when funds become available.

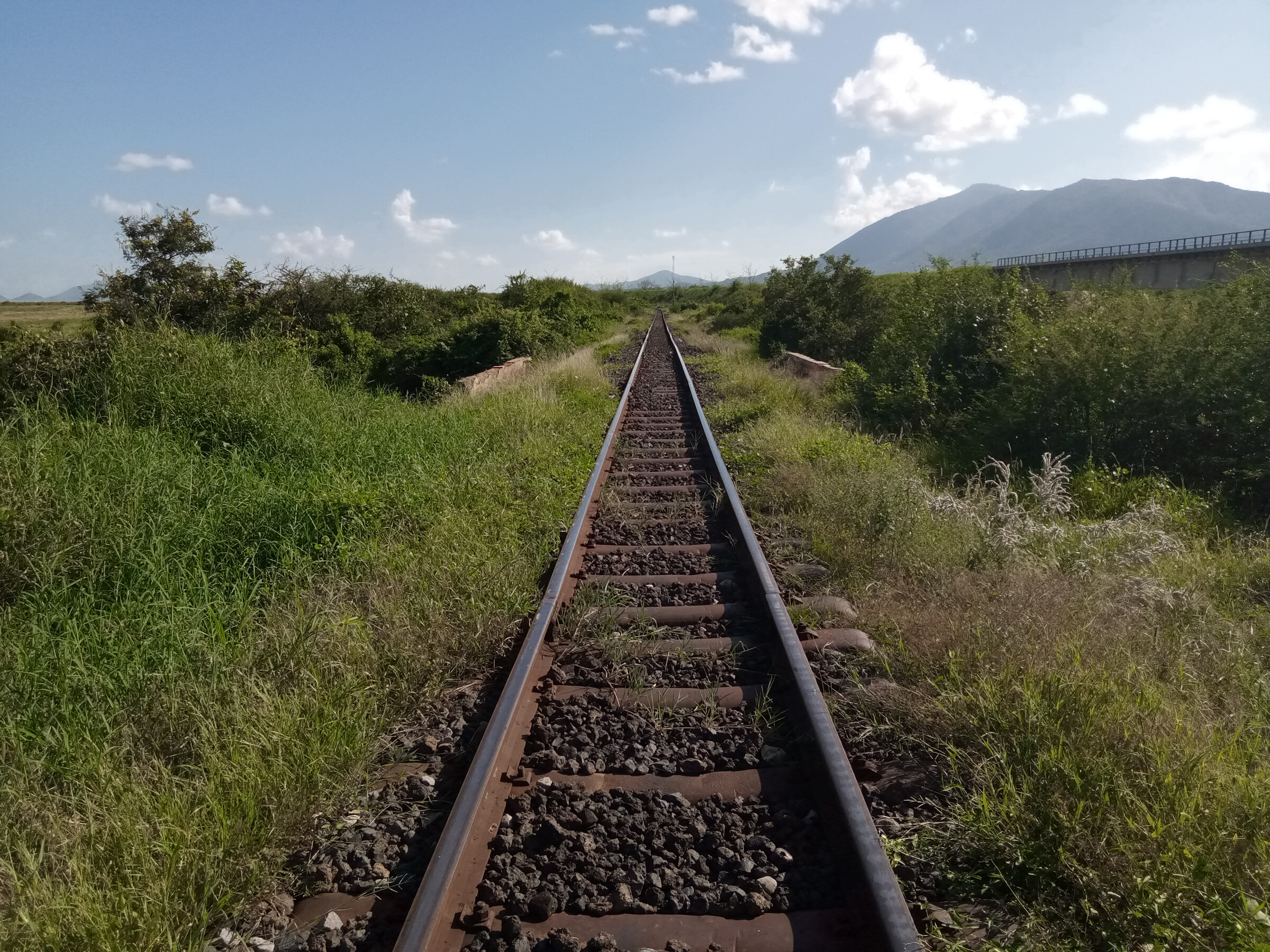
Mombasa-Nairobi metre gauge Railway outside

Uganda plans to construct a total of four SGR lines, totaling 1,547 kilometres (961 mi), at an estimated cost of US$12.6 billion. Uganda's SGR is planned to link it to four neighboring countries, including Kenya, Rwanda, DR Congo and South Sudan.

==== The Rift Valley Consortium ====
Between 2006 and 2017, a company known as Rift Valley Railways (RVRC) managed the Kenya Railways Corporation's and the Uganda Railways Corporation's 1,000 mm (3 ft 3 3/8 in) metre gauge railway systems, under a 25-year concession.

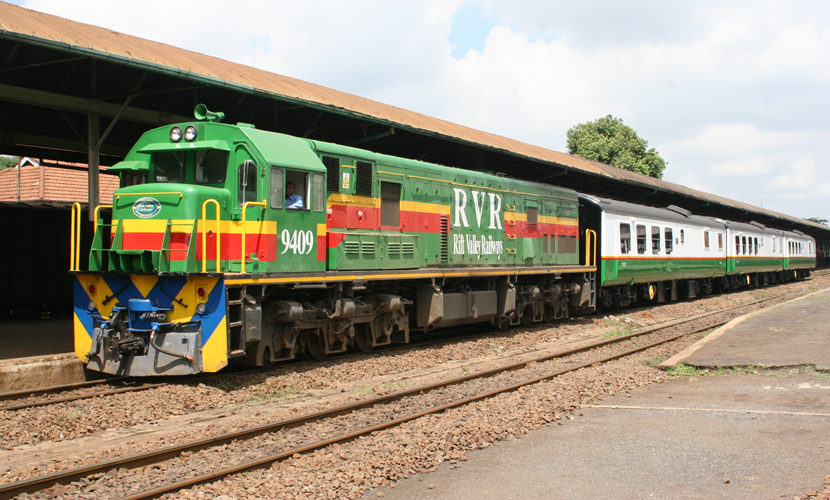
Rift Valley Railway Nairobi

In August 2017, the government of Kenya terminated the RVRC concession, citing failure by RVRC to perform as stipulated in the concession agreement. In October 2017, Uganda followed suit, but RVRC ran to court to stop the termination. In February 2018, Uganda Railways Corporation finally took possession of the concession assets and resumed operating the metre-gauge railway system in Uganda.

== Waterways ==
Lake Victoria is the principal waterway with commercial traffic. In conjunction with train services, the railway companies of Uganda and Tanzania operate train ferries on the lake between railhead ports of the two countries and Kenya. These ferries load rail coaches and wagons. Jinja and Port Bell, on a 7 kilometres (4 mi) branch line from Kampala, are the railheads for Uganda, connecting to Mwanza, Tanzania and Kisumu, Kenya.

The Port Bell ferry wharf is visible on high-resolution Google Earth photos at latitude 0.2885° longitude 32.653°. Other ferries serve non-railhead ports on the lake. There are dry dock facilities at Port Bell (Luzira), which were under renewed use as of June 2018.

A new inland port, Bukasa Inland Port is under development on the northern shores of Lake Victoria, at Bukasa, in Wakiso District, about 20 kilometres (12 mi), by road, south-east of the central business district of Kampala, the capital and largest city of Uganda. When completed the inland port is designed to handle up to 5.2 million tonnes of freight annually. The port will facilitate movement of goods from the Tanzanian ports of Dar es Salaam and Tanga, via rail to the port of Mwanza on Lake Victoria. Barges would then bring the cargo over the lake to Bukasa. This would reduce Uganda's near-total dependence on the port of Mombasa, Kenya.

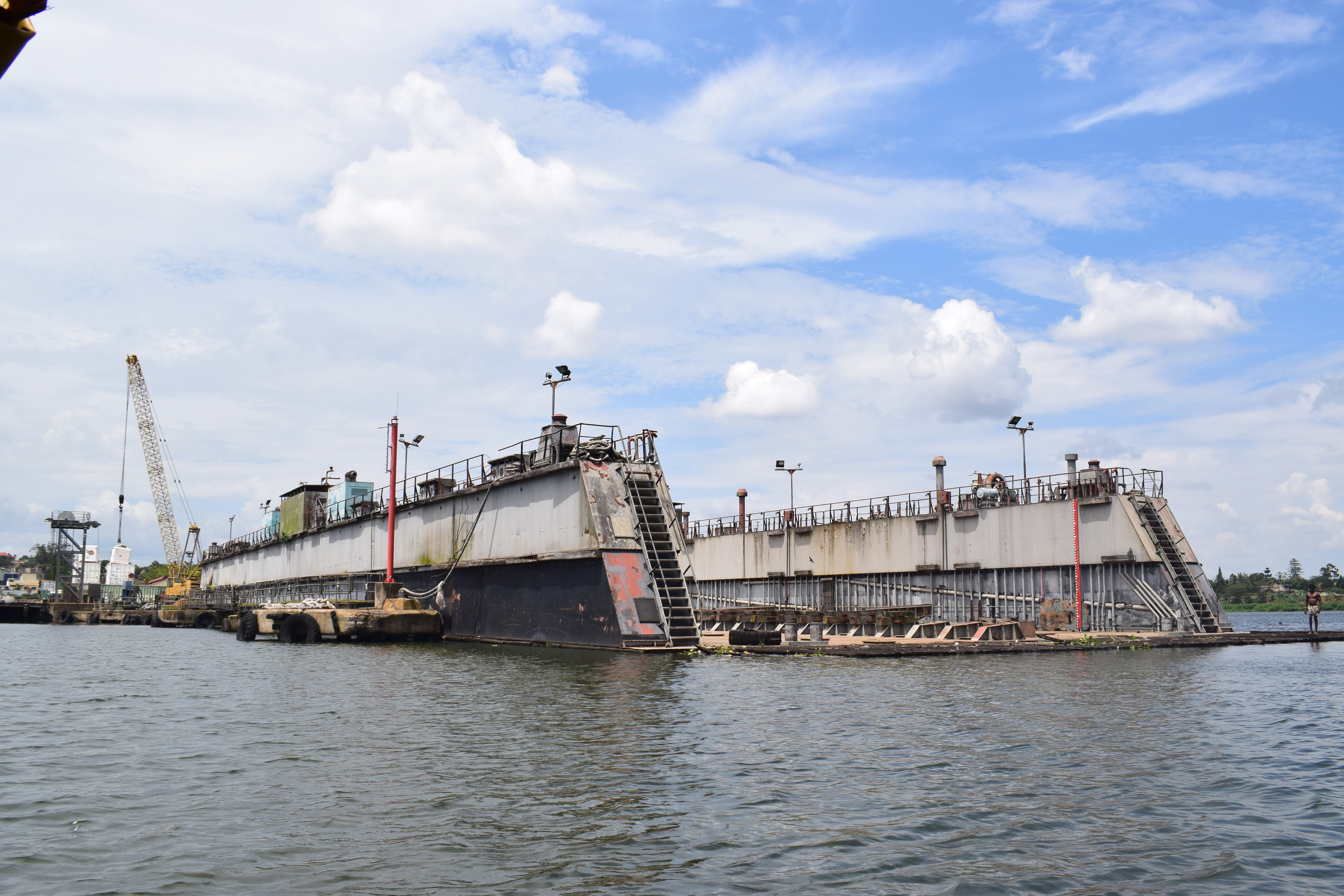
Port Bell Pier

Lake Kyoga and the Victoria Nile south of the lake constitute the second most important commercial waterway. There used to be a steamboat service between Namasagali, a railhead port on the Nile, going as far as Masindi-Port on the other side of Lake Kyoga. Other waterways such as Lake Albert, Lake George, Lake Edward, and the Albert Nile do not carry commercial traffic to any great extent.

== Airports ==
Entebbe International Airport is Uganda's largest and busiest airport, servicing in excess of 1.5 million arrivals annually, as of 2015. In February 2015, the Government of Uganda began a three-phase expansion and upgrade of Entebbe Airport planned to last from 2015 until 2035.

In January 2018, SBC Uganda Limited, a joint venture company between Colas Limited of the United Kingdom and SBI International Holdings of Uganda, started construction of Kabaale International Airport in Hoima District. The first phase of construction, including the runway and cargo-handling facilities, is expected to be ready in 2020. This phase is primarily to support construction of the Uganda Oil Refinery. The second phase of construction, focused on the facilitation of passengers and boosting tourism and business, is expected to conclude in 2022.

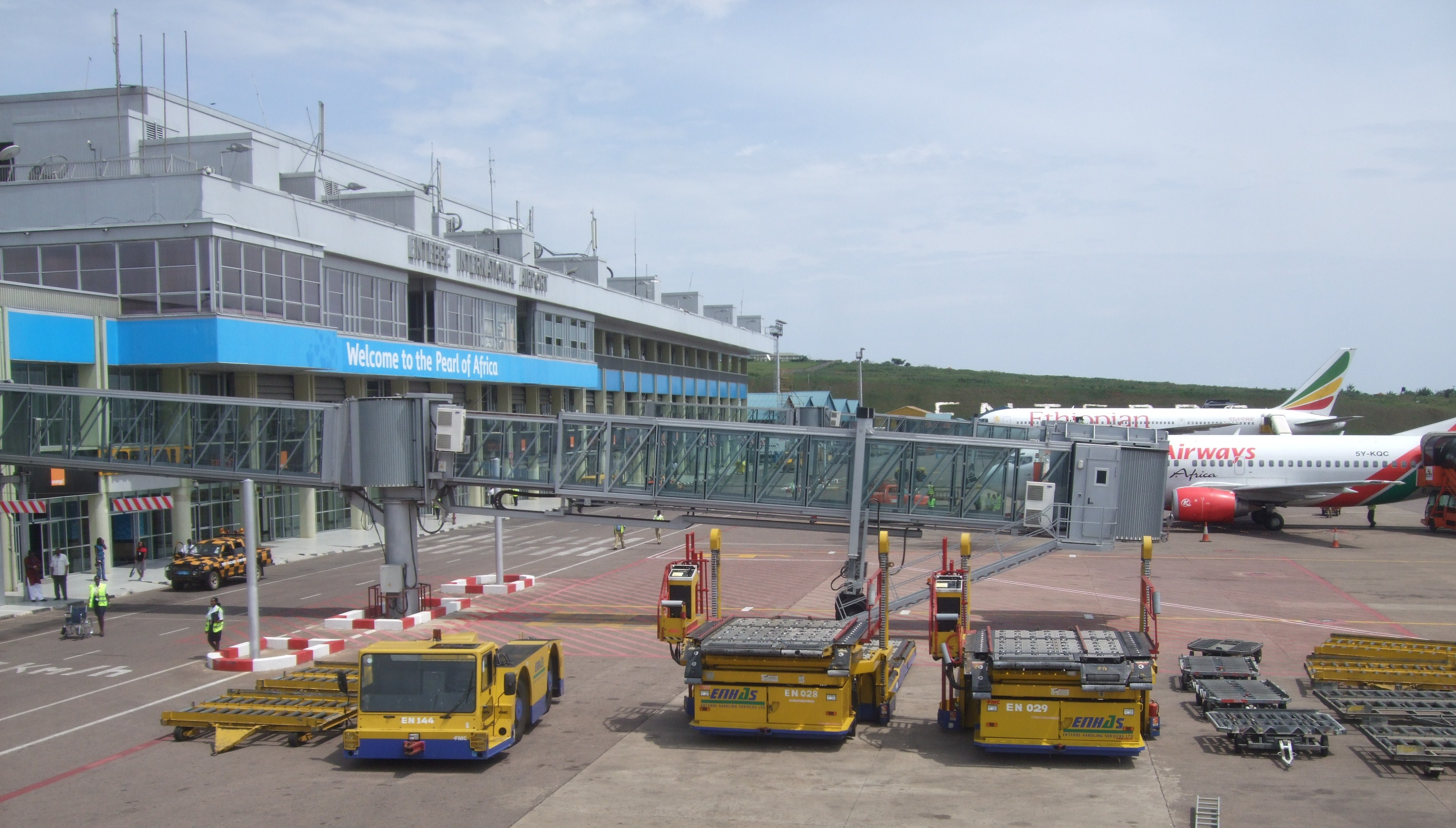
Entebbe Airport

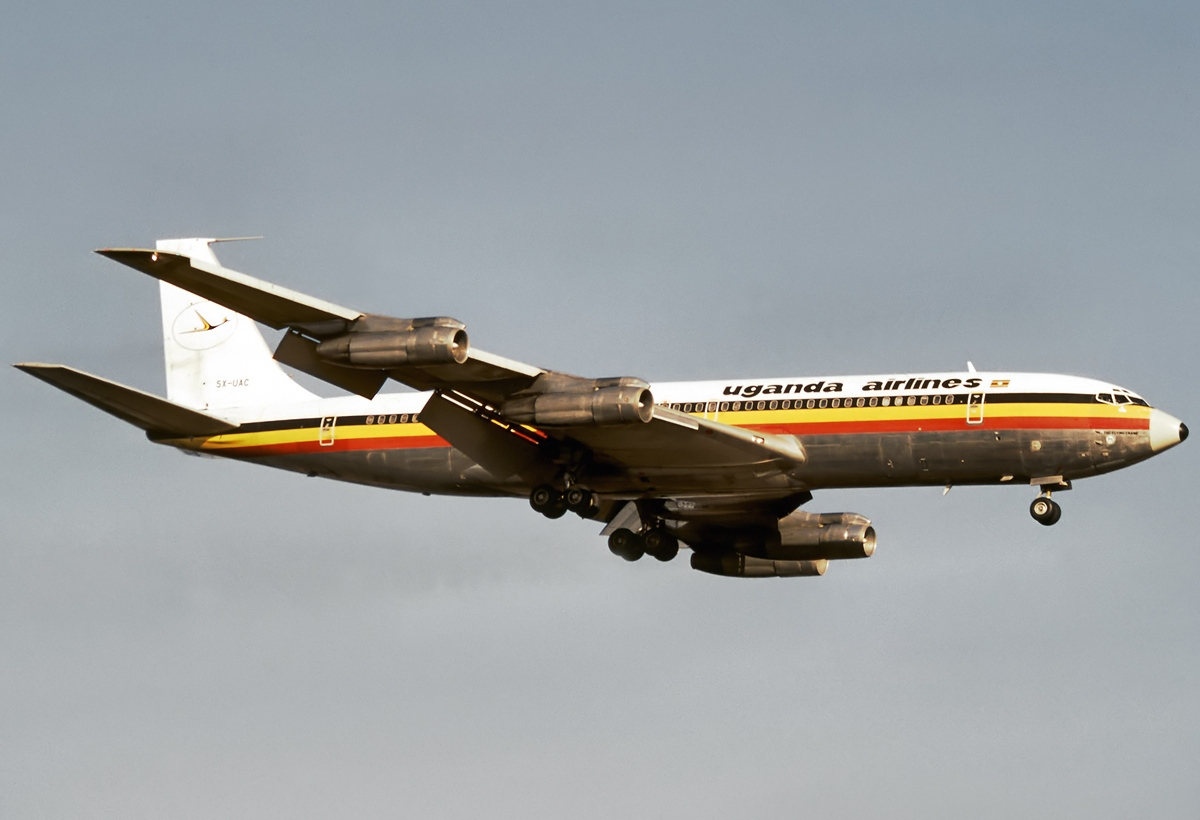
Uganda Airlines (1977 - 2001)

As of June 2018, according to the CIA Factbook, Uganda had 47 airports, five of which had paved runways, namely Entebbe Airport, Gulu Airport, Soroti Airport, Nakasongola Airport and Jinja Airport.

== See also ==
- Economy of Uganda
- East African Railway Master Plan
- Lake Victoria ferries
