= Uganda Civil Aviation Authority =

Civil aviation regulator in Uganda

Coordinates: 0°02′23″N 32°26′53″E

Uganda Civil Aviation Authority (UCAA)
- Type: Parastatal
- Industry: Aviation regulation
- Founded: 1991; 35 years ago
- Headquarters: Entebbe, Uganda
- Key people: Steven Kavuma; Chairman; Fred Bamwesigye; Director General; Olive Birungi Lumonya; Deputy Director General.
- Website: Homepage

The Uganda Civil Aviation Authority (UCAA) is the government agency responsible for licensing, monitoring, and regulating civil aviation matters in the country. It is administered by the Uganda Ministry of Works and Transport.

== Location ==
The authority's head offices are at Entebbe International Airport, approximately 49 kilometres (30 mi) south of Kampala, the capital and largest city of Uganda. The coordinates of the CAA headquarters are 0°02'23.0"N, 32°26'53.0"E (Latitude:0.039722; Longitude:32.448056).

== Overview ==
The agency was created by an Act of Parliament in 1991 as a state agency of the Ministry of Transport, Housing and Communication. As of October 2016, it was under the Ministry of Works and Transport.

The mandate of the UCAA is to coordinate and oversee Uganda's aviation industry, including licensing, regulation, air search and rescue, air traffic control, ownership of airports and aerodromes, and implementation of Ugandan and international aviation law. It also represents Uganda in an international capacity within the aviation community and in all other aviation matters. As of October 2016, the UCAA managed Entebbe International Airport and 13 other airports across the country.

== Organization and operations ==
As of October 2016, the CAA works with an administrative and operational structure of six directorates: (1) Directorate of Airports and Aviation Security (2) Directorate of Air Navigation Services (3) Directorate of Safety, Security & Economic Regulation (4) Directorate of Finance (5) Directorate of Human Resources & Administration (6) Directorate of Corporate Affairs

== Expansion plans ==
In January 2015, Minister of Works and Transport Abraham Byandala unveiled a 20-year plan to increase international airports from one to five and regional airports from two to three; and improve six existing local airports. The plan also calls for the improvement of Entebbe International Airport at a cost of US$200 million. Another $200 million will be needed to complete the upgrades to the other airports.

== Governance ==
The acting chief executive officer and Director General is Fred Bamwesigye. The chairman of the board of directors is Justice Steven Kavuma. As of September 2023, the following are the members of the board of Uganda Civil Aviation Authority: 1. Justice Steven Kavuma: Chairman 2. Ms. Ethel Kamba 3. Dr. Andrew Alyao Ocero 4. Thomas James Kiggundu 5. Moses Paul Lubowa 6. John Washington Bulindi 7. Ms Sylvia Namubiru 8. Godfrey Ssemugooma

== Name change ==
In July 2019, the President of Uganda signed The CAA Amendment Act 2019. The parliamentary act changed the name of the agency to Uganda Civil Aviation Authority.

== Certification and recognition ==
In September 2019, UCAA was awarded an international aviation award in air safety following outstanding performance in the Universal Security Audit Programme, conducted in 2017, by the International Civil Aviation Organization (ICAO). Uganda scored 81.8 percent in the audit, compared with the global average of 73 percent and the African and Indian Ocean (APII) states average of 58 percent, according to ICAO.

In October 2019, the International Trade Council, recognized the Uganda Civil Aviation Authority with the Government Agency of the Year Going Global Award 2019, in the Aviation Category. The award is in recognition of infrastructure improvement, staff training, customer care, support of tourism and facilitation of agricultural exports through Entebbe International Airport.

In September 2023, UCAA together with Entebbe International Airport and Uganda Airlines underwent the ICAO Oversight Safety Audit. Preliminary results indicate that Uganda scored 72.17 percent against the APII regional average of 55.66 percent and the global average of 67.68 percent. Detailed scores of this audit are expected to be released by ICAO in the second quarter of 2024.

== Developments ==
As of October 2024, Uganda had 57 active bilateral aviation safety agreements of which 26 were with African countries.

== See also ==
- Ugandan space initiatives
- List of airports in Uganda
- Entebbe International Airport
- Civil Aviation Authority of Uganda
- Uganda Airlines
