= Entebbe International Airport =

International airport in Uganda

Entebbe International Airport Uwanja wa Ndege wa Kimataifa wa Entebbe (Swahili)
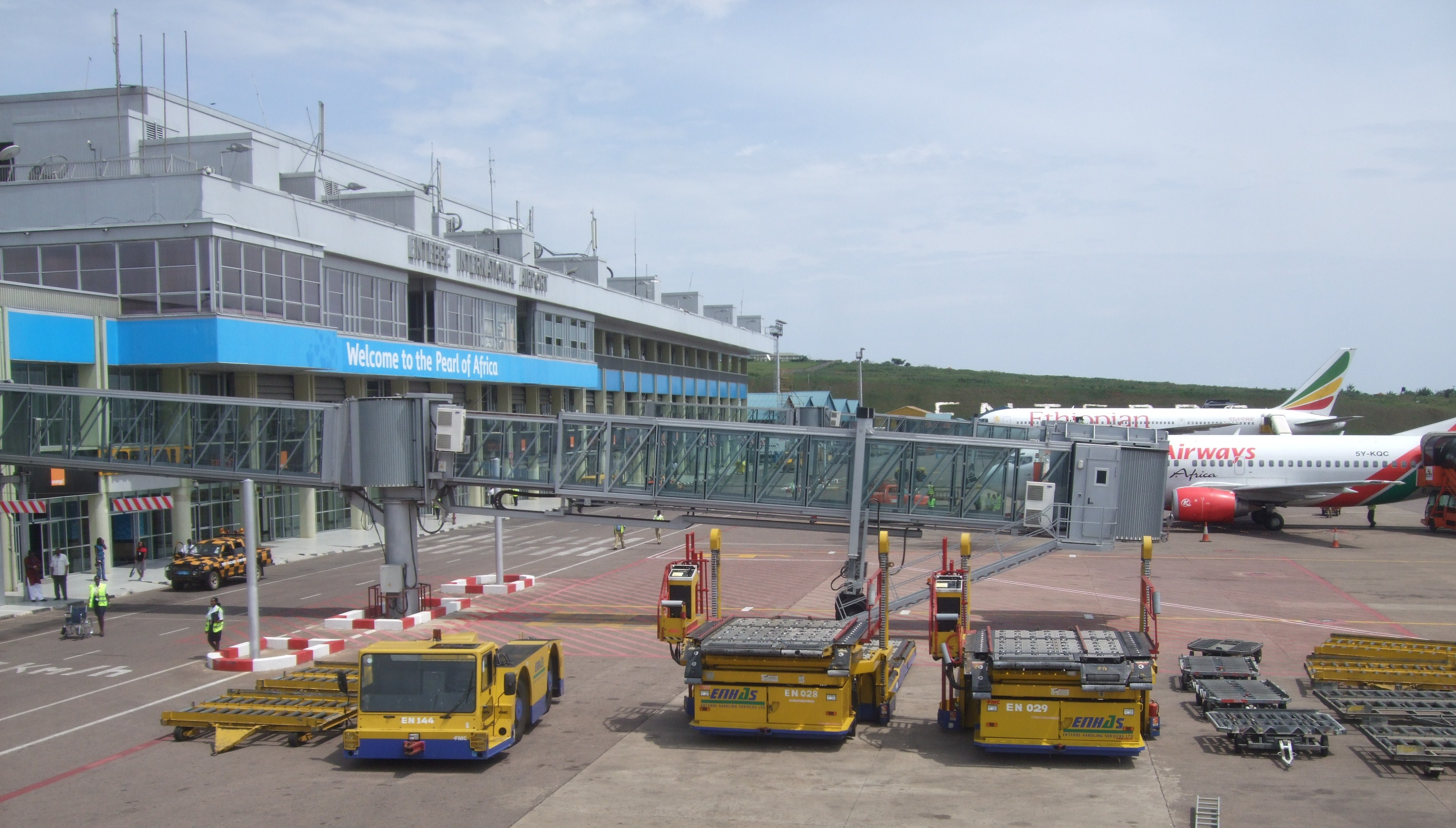
- IATA: EBB; ICAO: HUEN

Summary
- Airport type: Public / Military
- Operator: Republic of Uganda
- Serves: Entebbe, Kampala, Mukono, Kira Town, Mpigi
- Location: Entebbe, Uganda
- Hub for: Eagle Air; Uganda Airlines
- Built: 1972–1973 (main terminal building)
- Elevation AMSL: 3,782 ft (1,153 m)
- Coordinates: 00°02′41″N 032°26′35″E
- Website: Website

Map
- Location of Entebbe International Airport in Uganda

Runways
Direction	Length		Surface
Direction	m	ft	Surface
17/35	3,658	12,000	Asphalt
12/30	2,408	7,900	Asphalt

Statistics (2025)
- Passengers: ▲2,614,977
- Aircraft movements: ▲41,004
- Cargo (tonnes): ▲70,061
- Source: DAFIF, UCAA

Entebbe International Airport (IATA: EBB, ICAO: HUEN) is the only international airport in Uganda. It is located about 6 kilometres (3.7 mi) southwest of the town of Entebbe, on the northern shores of Lake Victoria. This is approximately 40 kilometres (25 mi) by road south-west of the central business district of Kampala, the capital city of Uganda.

The headquarters of the Civil Aviation Authority of Uganda have been relocated to a new block off the airport highway (Entebbe–Kampala Expressway and Tunnel Road), but adjacent to the airport terminals.

== History ==
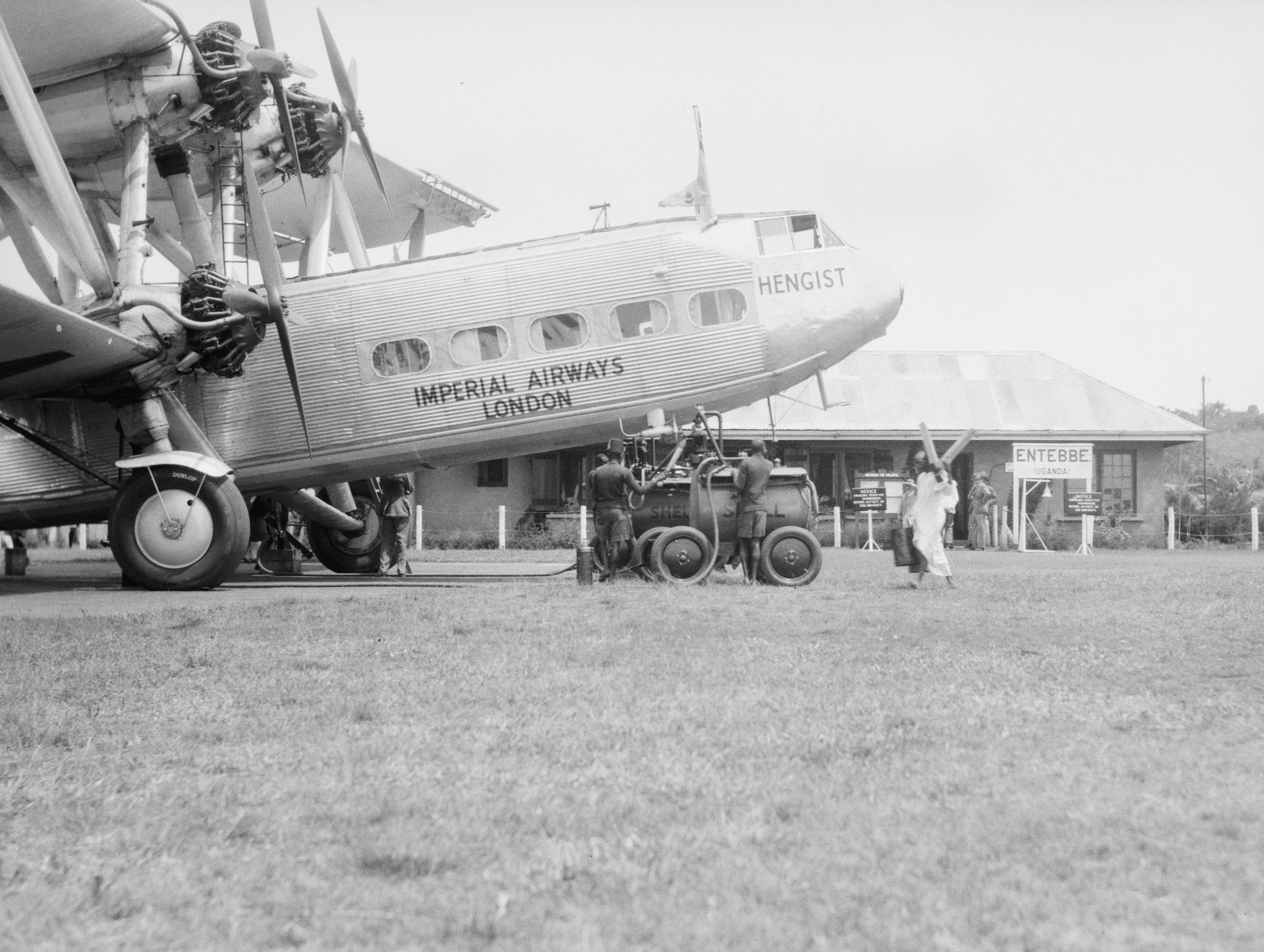
A Handley Page H.P.42 of Imperial Airways at Entebbe, 1936

The airport was opened by the British Colonial authorities. According to the website of the Uganda Civil Aviation Authority, due to the airport's location on Lake Victoria and the existing facilities, the colonial government decided that the most optimal location for aviation traffic was Entebbe.

On 10 November 1951, the airport was formally reopened after its facilities had been extended. Runway 12/30 was now 9,900 feet (3,000 m), in preparation for services by the de Havilland Comet. The new main terminal building of the airport was designed by Yugoslav Montenegrin architect Aleksandar Keković and built by Energoprojekt holding in 1972-1973 period.

The Old Entebbe airport is used by Uganda's military forces. It was the scene of a hostage rescue operation by Israeli Sayeret Matkal, dubbed Operation Entebbe, in 1976 after an Arab-German hijacking of Air France Flight 139 following a stopover in Athens, Greece, en route to Paris from Tel Aviv. The scene of that rescue was the old terminal, which has been demolished, except for its control tower and airport hall. According to a 2006 published report, plans were made to construct a domestic passenger terminal at the site of the old airport. The airport was partially destroyed in April 1979 when it was captured by Tanzanian forces during the Uganda–Tanzania War.

According to ThePrint in November 2021, reports in African media suggest that China could take over the airport over the default of a loan, which was denied by China's foreign ministry and Government of Uganda. Bloomberg News reported that the Ugandan government is seeking to amend a $200m loan agreement it signed with the Export-Import Bank of China in 2015, to ensure it doesn't lose control of the airport, citing a report from the Daily Monitor, an independent Ugandan daily newspaper. On 1 December 2021, the Attorney General of Uganda stated they had seen the story regarding the airport in media and that it was reportedly fake news.

== Modernization plans: 2015–2033 ==
In February 2015, the Government of South Korea, through the Korea International Cooperation Agency, gave the Government of Uganda (GOU) a grant of USh 27 billion towards modernization of the airport. In the same month, the GOU began a three phase upgrade and expansion of the airport to last from 2015 until 2035. The entire renovation budget is approximately US$586 million.

=== Phase I – 2015 to 2018 ===
- Estimated cost of US$200 million, borrowed from Exim Bank of China.
- Relocation and expansion of the cargo terminal.
- Construction of new passenger terminal building.
- Modernizing and improving existing passenger terminal building.
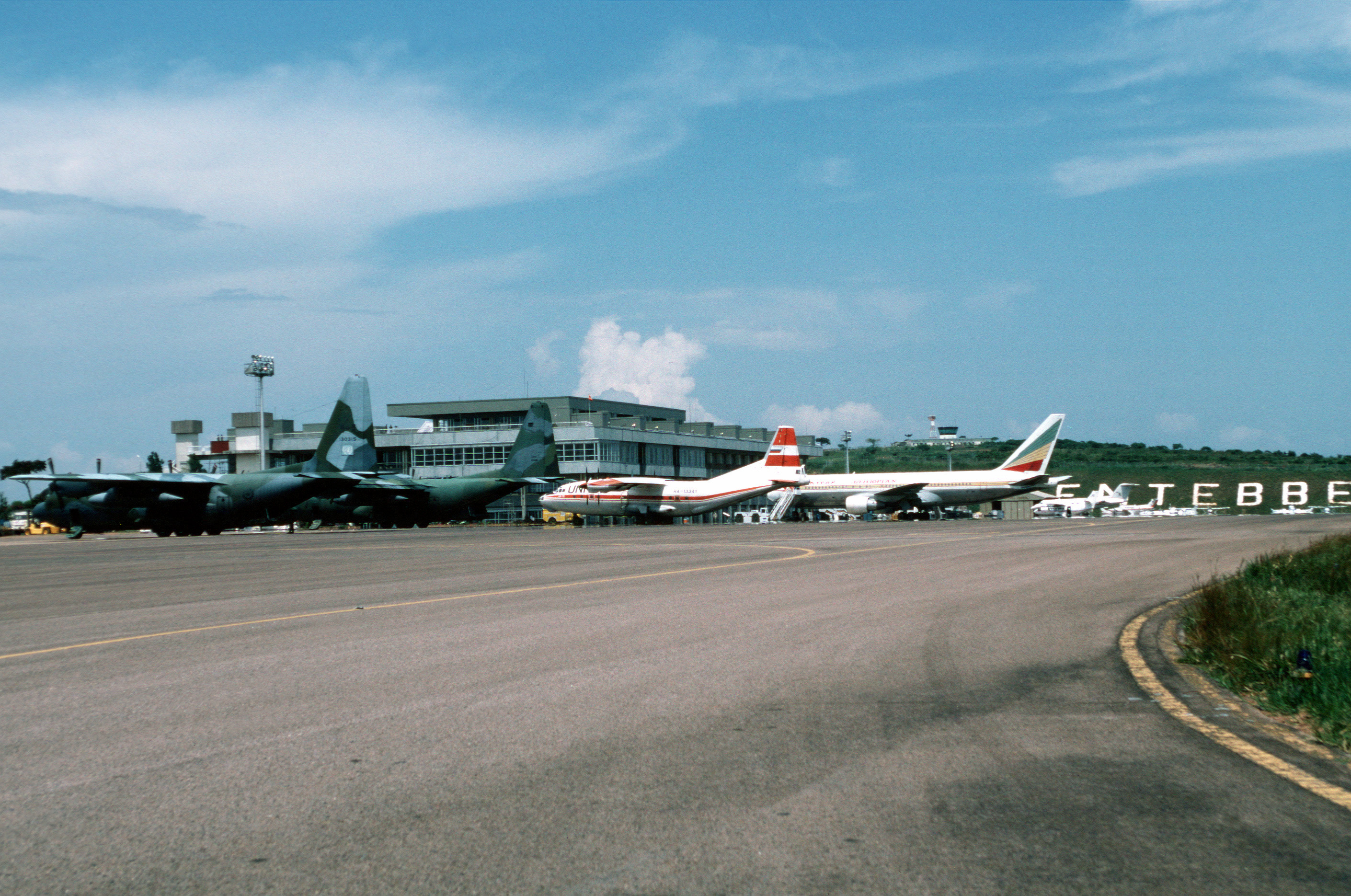
  Entebbe Airport in 1994
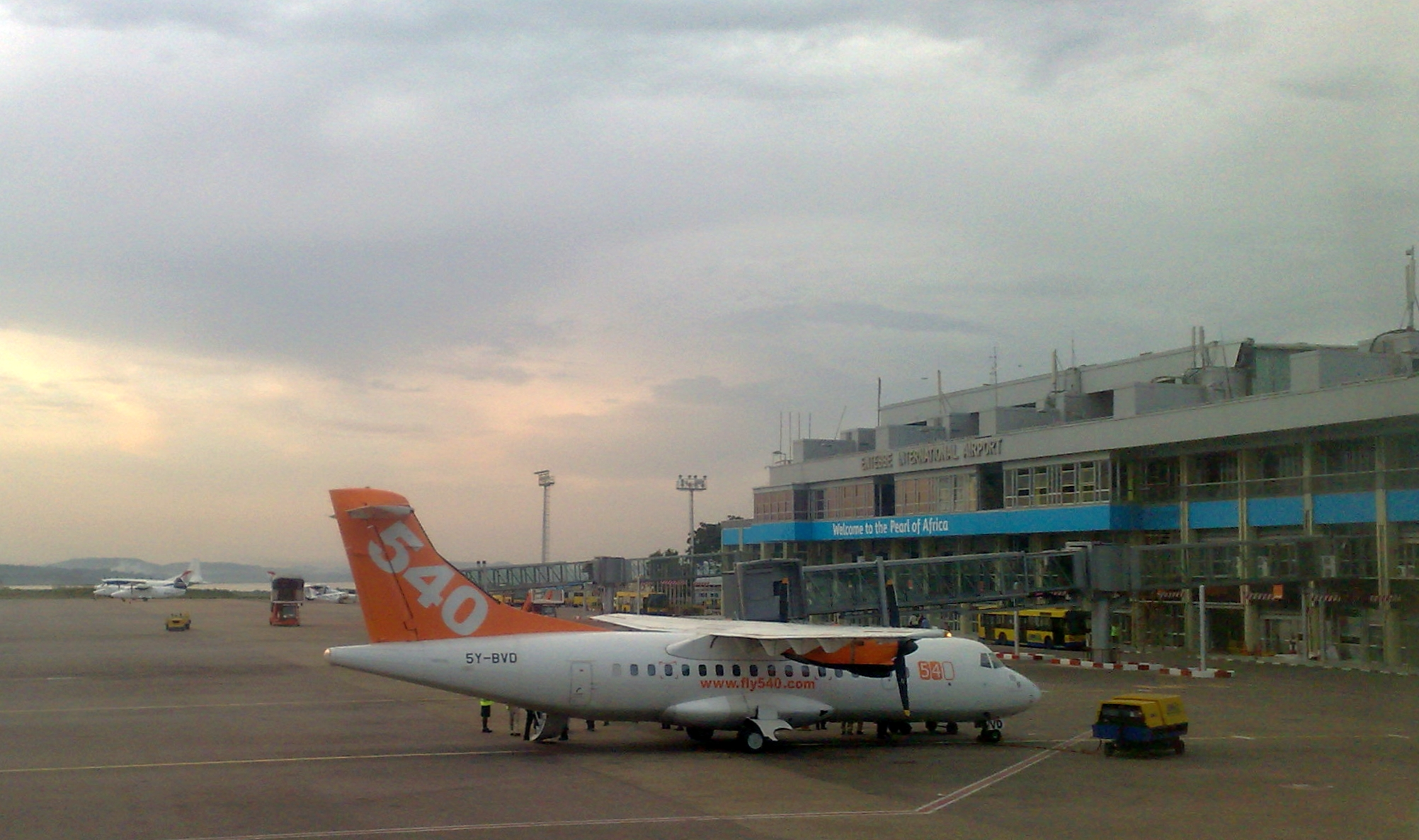
  Entebbe Airport in 2009
- Renovation and rehabilitation of "Runway 12/30" (the main runway), is expected to conclude in February 2019.

In March 2022, online and print media reported that the Chinese-built cargo center, capable of handling 100,000 metric tonnes of cargo, had begun commercial operations. This had replaced the old cargo facility with capacity of 50,000 metric tonnes, originally converted from an old aircraft hangar. It is expected that later in 2024, upon completion of the ongoing Phase I upgrades, the airport will increase its passenger-handling capacity from 2 million to 3.5 million annually.

=== Phase II – 2019 to 2023 ===
- Estimated cost of US$120 million.
- Delays due to COVID-19 pandemic.
- Relocation and expansion of fuel storage facilities.
  - In July 2024, the Nile Post reported that Tristar Energy Limited, an aviation fuel supply-company, based in the United Arab Emirates and active in 31 countries, had completed the construction of underground storage tanks with storage capacity of 12,000,000 litres (12,000 m^{3}) of aviation fuel and pipelines measuring 7 kilometres (4 mi), which were ready for commercial commissioning. Over the next five years, the capacity of the underground storage tanks is expected to be expanded by another 11,000,000 liters (11,000 m^{3}). As of 2029, the aviation fuel storage capacity at this airport is planned to be 23,000,000 liters (23,000 m^{3}). Construction of the fuel storage tanks has been ongoing since 2017.

=== Phase III – After 2024 ===
- Estimated cost of US$160.5 million.
- Building new multi-story car park.
- Construction of new control tower.
- Strengthen and reseal current runways.

== Expansion of departure and arrival lounges ==
In April 2016, Minister of Works John Byabagambi launched a USh 42.6 billion (US$11.4 million) project to expand the departure and arrival lounges. The work will be carried out by Seyani Brothers Limited and will be fully funded by the Civil Aviation Authority of Uganda. Construction is scheduled to commence on 1 June 2016 with completion expected in December 2017. This work is separate from the large expansion partially funded by the government of South Korea and People's Republic of China.

== Facilities ==
Passenger facilities include a left-luggage office, banks, automated teller machines, foreign exchange bureaux, restaurants, and duty-free shops.

== Airlines and destinations ==
=== Passenger ===
Airlines	Destinations
Air Arabia	Sharjah
Air Congo	Kinshasa–N'djili
Air Tanzania	Dar es Salaam, Kilimanjaro
Badr Airlines	Juba
BAR Aviation Uganda	Pakuba
Egyptair	Cairo
Emirates	Dubai–International
Ethiopian Airlines	Addis Ababa
Flydubai	Dubai–International
Flynas	Jeddah
Jambojet	Nairobi–Jomo Kenyatta
Kenya Airways	Nairobi–Jomo Kenyatta
Malawi Airlines	Lilongwe
Qatar Airways	Doha
RwandAir	Kigali, Juba, Nairobi–Jomo Kenyatta
Tarco Aviation	Port Sudan
Turkish Airlines	Istanbul
Uganda Airlines	Abuja, Accra, Bujumbura, Dar es Salaam, Dubai–International, Harare, Johannesburg–O.R. Tambo, Kigali (begins 18 November 2026), Kilimanjaro, Kinshasa–N'djili, Lagos, London–Gatwick, Lusaka, Mogadishu, Mumbai, Nairobi–Jomo Kenyatta, Zanzibar

Airlines offering specialized passenger service to non-stop destinations

Airlines	Destinations
United Nations Humanitarian Air Service	Juba, Kisangani

=== Cargo ===
Airlines	Destinations
African Airline	Johannesburg–O.R. Tambo, Nairobi–Jomo Kenyatta, Ostend/Bruges
EgyptAir Cargo	Sharjah
Emirates SkyCargo	Dubai–Al Maktoum
Ethiopian Airlines Cargo	Addis Ababa
Etihad Cargo	Abu Dhabi
Flynas Cargo	Riyadh
Qatar Airways Cargo	Brussels, Doha, Nairobi–Jomo Kenyatta
Stabo Air	Liège

== Ground handling ==
As of September 2025, there were four ground-handling companies serving this airport:

- Menzies Aviation Uganda (MAU), the largest of the four.
- DAS Handling Limited (Dairo Air Services Handling Limited) has acquired ACC3/RA3 European Union ground handling certification.
- Fresh Handling Limited, which handles exports of cut flowers, and agricultural products.
- Uganda Airlines Ground Handling, Uganda Airlines began self ground handling at EBB, in September 2022.

== Passenger traffic ==
Since 2002, international passenger traffic at the airport has increased annually, except for 2009 when the Great Recession caused a small decline and 2014. During the period between 1 January 2024 and 30 June 2024, EBB handled a total of 1,069,224 international passengers (527,692 arrivals and 541,532 departures). During the same period the airport handled 32,794 metric tones of cargo of which 22,380 metric tones were exports and 10,414 metric tones were imports. During the 12 months that ended 31 December 2025, EBB handled 69,595 metric tones of cargo.

Year	Passengers	Difference
1991	118,527	
1992	130,704	+10.3%
1993	148,502	+13.6%
1994	191,706	+29.1%
1995	254,335	+32.7%
1996	296,778	+16.7%
1997	326,265	+9.9%
1998	334,681	+2.6%
1999	344,686	+3.0%
2000	343,846	-0.2%
2001	343,722	0.0%
2002	362,075	+5.3%
2003	416,697	+15.1%
2004	475,726	+14.2%
2005	551,853	+16.0%
2006	643,330	+16.6%
2007	781,428	+21.5%
2008	936,184	+19.8%
2009	929,052	–0.8%
2010	1,023,437	+10.2%
2011	1,085,609	+6.1%
2012	1,238,536	+14.1%
2013	1,343,963	+8.5%
2014	1,332,499	-0.9%
2015	1,390,000	+4.3
2016	1,420,000	+2.2%
2017	1,650,000	+16.2%
2018	1,840,264	+11.5%
2019	1,980,000	+7.6%
2020	565,541	-71.4%
2021	941,688	+66.5%
2022	1,574,405	+67.2%
2023	1,930,000	+22.6%
2024	2,243,104	+16.1%
2025	2,486,893	+10.9%

== Certification ==
In September 2023, EBB together with Uganda Civil Aviation Authority and Uganda Airlines underwent the ICAO Oversight Safety Audit.

== Controversies ==
Several Ugandan local and international media reports claimed that Uganda would lose the grip on Entebbe International Airport to China for failing to repay the loan it borrowed from China. However, Ugandan officials denied claims regarding the possibility of China taking control of the airport. Exim Bank of China had imposed strict and aggressive repayment terms on a US$200 million loan to expand Uganda's only international airport.

On 14 April 2021, the SriLankan Airlines in its official Twitter handle claimed that Sri Lankan cargo had made history by operating three successive cargo charter flights to Entebbe International Airport, uplifting over 102 metric tonnes of printed papers in February 2021. The information on what kind of printed paper was transported was not revealed by SriLankan Airlines due to confidentiality reasons. However, the cargo carrier deleted the tweet for unknown reasons and it created doubts about the transparency of SriLankan Airlines and speculations arose about the transfer of "printed papers" cargo charter flights which departed to Uganda in February 2021. SriLankan Airlines later issued a statement clarifying that the printed material which was deported to Uganda included only the Ugandan currency notes and it further revealed that due to security reasons with bordering Kenya, the Ugandan government preferred to obtain printed Ugandan shilling notes from a global security printer. The Biyagama branch of the De La Rue company is responsible for printing currency notes to countries including Uganda. SriLankan Airlines insisted that the consignment was purely commercial in nature and brought much needed foreign revenue for the airlines and Sri Lanka.

== Accidents and incidents ==
- On 30 April 2000, a McDonnell Douglas DC-10 operated by DAS Air Cargo and registered as N800WR overran the runway on landing at Entebbe. All 7 people on board survived but the aircraft was destroyed and written off. The aircraft ended in Lake Victoria.
- On 9 March 2009, an Aerolift Ilyushin Il-76, registered as S9-SAB, crashed into Lake Victoria just after takeoff from Entebbe airport. Two of the engines caught fire on take-off and the resulting crash resulted in the deaths of all 11 people on board. The aircraft had been chartered by Dynacorp on behalf of the African Union Mission to Somalia. The accident was investigated by Uganda's Ministry of Transport, which concluded that all four engines were time-expired and that Aerolift's claim that maintenance had been performed to extend their service life or that the work had been certified could not be substantiated.

== See also ==
- List of airports in Uganda
- Civil Aviation Authority of Uganda
- Uganda Airlines
