= Zana, Uganda =

Zana
- Location in Uganda; Placement on map is approximate
- Coordinates: 00°15′52″N 32°33′26″E
- Country: Uganda
- Region: Central Uganda
- District: Wakiso District
- Municipality: Ssabagabo
- County: Kyaddondo
- Constituency: Ssabagabo Municipality
- Elevation: 3,870 ft (1,180 m)

Zana is a neighborhood in Ssabagabo Municipality, Kyaddondo County, Wakiso District, in Central Uganda. The place was named after a powerful business woman in the 1980s called Zana.

== Location ==
Zana is bordered by Wankulukuku and Namasuba to the north, the Kampala-Entebbe Road and Najjanankumbi to the east, Lubowa to the south and Bunamwaya to the west.

This location is approximately 8 kilometres (5.0 mi), by road, south of Kampala, the capital of Uganda and the largest city in the country. The geographical coordinates of Zana are: 0°15'52.0"N, 32°33'26.0"E (Latitude:0.264444; Longitude:32.557222).

== Overview ==
Zana is one of the neighborhoods in Ssabagabo Municipality, in sub-urban Wakiso District, immediately south of Kampala, on the road to Entebbe, the location of Uganda's largest civilian and military airport, Entebbe International Airport.

The neighborhood is a middle-class mixed-use community, with large and medium-sized businesses along the Entebbe Road, with residences further away from the main road. Large businesses in the neighborhood, include a sales office and show room belonging to Uganda Baati Limited, a manufacturer of corrugated iron sheets and steel construction materials.

Another business in the neighborhood is the Life Line International Hospital, owned by Charles Ibingira, which opened in December 2018.

On the 7th of June 2024, malaria and public health activist, Precious Baba in collaboration with the students of Zana Parents’ School organized a cleanup exercise to curb the spread of neglected tropical diseases in the community. They swept and cleaned trenches and sewage in an effort to help reduce the spread of diseases in the community. The New Vision, BigEye.Ug and Nile Post were among the present media houses.

== See also ==
- List of hospitals in Uganda
- Entebbe-Kampala Expressway
