= Mutundwe–Entebbe High Voltage Power Line =

Electricity transmission line in Uganda

Location
- Country: Uganda
- Coordinates: 00°15′26″N 30°06′58″E
- General direction: North to South
- From: Mutundwe, Uganda
- To: Entebbe, Uganda

Ownership information
- Owner: Government of Uganda
- Partners: KfW
- Operator: Uganda Electricity Transmission Company Limited

Construction information
- Construction started: 2019
- Expected: Commissioning 2022 Expected
- Construction cost: US$22 million

Technical information
- Current type: AC
- Total length: 36 km (22 mi)
- AC voltage: 132kV
- No. of circuits: 2

The Mutundwe–Entebbe High Voltage Power Line is a high voltage electricity power line, connecting the high voltage substation in the Kampala suburb of Mutundwe to another high voltage substation in the city of Entebbe, in the Central Region of Uganda.

== Location ==
The 132 kilo Volt power line starts at the Uganda Electricity Transmission Company Limited (UETCL) 132kV substation at Mutundwe, in Rubaga Division, in the southwestern part of Kampala. From there it travels southwards and slightly westwards, following the direction of the Kampala-Entebbe Expressway, but passing west of the expressway, through Kajjansi and Akright City, to end in Entebbe, a distance of approximately 36 kilometres (22 mi).

== Overview ==
Entebbe is a growing city, with a population estimated at 102,600, as of July 2020. At that time, the Uganda Bureau of Statistics (UBOS), calculated the average population growth rate of the city at 6.7 percent annually, between 2014 and 2020. In addition, the city is home to key national installations, including State House Entebbe and Entebbe International Airport.

UETCL has decided to construct a new power line to deliver stable power to the Entebbe metropolis, to meet the energy needs of current and future residents and industry. Detailed work plans include the construction of a "double circuit 132 kV transmission line between the Mutundwe substation in Kampala and Entebbe."

Work includes the extension of the existing 132/33/11 kV Mutundwe substation. In addition, a brand new outdoor 132/33 kV substation will be built in Entebbe, with 33kV indoor switchgear.

== Construction ==
The work on this power transmission line was scheduled to begin in 2014. Completion was initially planned for 2017. However construction was still in progress, as of 2021. Gopa-Intec, a German engineering firm was selected as Consultant, to review the feasibility study done in 2011 and revise designs, and route of power line. A three-week training course was arranged at Bad Homburg, Germany for the Owner's Engineering Team. This project received partial funding from Kreditanstalt für Wiederaufbau (KfW).

== See also ==
- Energy in Uganda
- List of power stations in Uganda
