= Charles Ibingira =

Ugandan academic

Professor Charles Ibingira
- Born: 1964 (age 61–62); Uganda
- Citizenship: Uganda
- Education: Makerere University (Bachelor of Medicine and Bachelor of Surgery) (Master of Medicine in Surgery); College of Surgeons of East, Central and Southern Africa (Fellow of the College of Surgeons of East, Central and Southern Africa); University of Cape Town (Diploma in International Research Ethics)
- Occupations: Surgeon, researcher, academic
- Years active: 1996 - present
- Known for: Medical administration
- Title: Principal of Makerere University College of Health Sciences

Professor Charles Ibingira is a Ugandan surgeon, academic and medical administrator. He is the Principal of Makerere University College of Health Sciences. He was appointed to that position in November 2015, on a four-year renewable contract. He has previously served as the Dean of Makerere University School of Biomedical Sciences, from 2010 until 2014.

== Background and education ==
He was born in the Toro sub-region of the Western Region of Uganda, circa 1964. After attending local elementary and secondary schools, he was admitted to Makerere University School of Medicine, a component of the Makerere University College of Health Sciences. He graduated in 1988, with a Bachelor of Medicine and Bachelor of Surgery degree. Later, in 1996, he obtained a Master of Medicine degree in general surgery, from the same university.

He is a Fellow of the College of Surgeons of East, Central and Southern Africa (COSECSA), and was elected in 2003. He also holds a Diploma in International Research Ethics, awarded by the University of Cape Town, in 2007.

== Career ==
Charles Ibingira has taken on increasing responsibility at Makerere College of Health Sciences, both clinically and administratively, starting in 1996, following his graduation with a master's degree in General Surgery.

He worked as a surgeon in a clinical setting. Academically, he started out as a lecturer, rising through the ranks to Associate Professor in the Department of Anatomy, at the Makerere University School of Biomedical Sciences, and eventually being appointed as the Dean of that school.

He is credited with spearheading the establishment of university programs in Biomedical Engineering and Biomedical Sciences at Makerere University. He has also actively worked to recruit and train faculty for these and other programs. Dr. Ibingira is a senior researcher in surgery, anatomy, and bioethics.

== Other considerations ==
Professor Charles Ibingira is the proprietor, founder and executive director of Life Line International Hospital, a private surgical medical facility located in the neighborhood called Zana, in Ssabagabo Municipality, along the Kampala-Entebbe Road. The hospital was opened in December 2018.

== See also ==
- Mulago National Referral Hospital
- Philippa Ngaju Makobore
