= Leah Kagasa =

Ugandan beauty pageant titleholder

- Born: April 5, 1995 (age 31); Uganda
- Education: Bweranyangi Girls' Senior Secondary School; Maryhill High School; Makerere University Business School -Bachelor of Business Administration in Marketing); Uganda Aviation School - Cabin crew Diploma
- Years active: 2016–present
- Title: Miss Uganda 2016

Leah Kagasa (born 5 April 1995) is a Ugandan and beauty pageant titleholder who won Miss Uganda 2016. She reigned for 2 years as Miss Uganda from 2016 to 2018. She represented Uganda in Miss World 2016 in Washington, D.C., that December. Currently she is involved in the Miss Uganda Foundation charity organization as an advocate for social issues including sanitation, teenage pregnancies and girl child education.

== Background ==
Leah Kagasa was born in 1995, to Ugandan parents in Kabarole District. She attended St. Helen’s Primary School, before transferring to Bweranyangi Girls' Senior Secondary School for O-Level studies. She completed her A-Level education at Maryhill High School.

She graduated from Makerere University Business School with a Bachelor's degree in marketing. She also holds a Cabin crew Diploma, from the Uganda Aviation School, where she attended on a scholarship, provided by flight captain Mike Mukula, the school's proprietor.

== 2016 Miss Uganda pageant ==
At Miss Uganda 2016, Kagasa she was crowned by Miss Uganda 2015Zahara Nakiyaga. In 2017, there was no Miss Uganda contest and Kagasa continued as Miss Uganda until the 2018 Miss Uganda contest in August 2018. Besides winning the beauty pageant, Kagasa was also voted "Miss Popularity".

During the two years that she served as Miss Uganda, she has participated in several community development projects, including a clean water campaign with UNAA Causes, an American-Ugandan non-profit based in the United States. Other campaigns have included the "Kick Malaria out of Uganda" with the Uganda Ministry of Health.

== Miss World 2016 ==
Leah Kagasa represented Uganda at the Miss World 2016, in Washington, D.C., United States.
