= St Paul's Secondary School, Lweza =

School in Uganda

St Paul's Secondary School
- Lweeza, Kajjansi, Wakiso District, Central Region; Uganda

Information
- School type: Day and boarding school
- Gender: Mixed

St. Paul's Secondary School is a mixed day and boarding school located in Lweza, Kajjansi, in Uganda's Central Region. The school offers both upper and lower secondary education authorities. It is a gender mixed school, and both day and boarding facilities are available for students.

== Operations ==
The school offers both O level and A level education.

Fully registered and equipped, the school has UNEB centres for both O and A level for students to sit their final examinations.

The school teaches all subjects, including in the arts and sciences, as recommended by the Ministry of Education and Sports hand in hand with the national curriculum development centre of the country.

== Location ==
The school is found in Lweeza, Kajjansi in Wakiso District, Central Region of Uganda. It is about 11 kilometres on the Kampala–Entebbe Road, and 600 meters along Lweeza-Kigo Road.

== See also ==
- Education in Uganda
- List of schools in Uganda
