= Lweeza =

- Map of Uganda showing the location of Lweeza
- Coordinates: 00°13′17″N 32°33′09″E
- Country: Uganda
- Region: Central Region
- County: Kaddondo
- Constituency: Kyaddondo South

Government
  - MP: Issa Kikungwe
- Elevation: 1,180 m (3,870 ft)
- Time zone: UTC+3 (EAT 0°13'17.0"N 32°33'09.0"E)

Lweeza, also Lweza, is a neighborhood in the Buganda Region of Uganda. The correct phonetic spelling consistent with the local Ganda language is Lweeza.

== Location ==
The neighborhood is located in the newly created municipality of Ssabagabo. Lweeza is bounded by Lubowa to the north, Murchison Bay (a part of Lake Victoria), to the east and south, and Kajjansi to the west. This location is approximately 30 kilometres (19 mi), by road, north of Entebbe International Airport, Uganda's largest civilian and military airport, and approximately 13 kilometres (8 mi), by road, south of Kampala, the capital and largest city of Uganda. The coordinates of Lweeza are 0°13'17.0"N, 32°33'09.0"E (Latitude:0.221391; Longitude:32.552506).

== Overview ==
Lweeza is primarily a working class residential and business neighborhood. As of October 2017, 68 percent of the residents lacked clean potable water. The neighborhood is criss-crossed by several roads and highways, including the old Kampala–Entebbe Road passes through Lweeza is a general north to south direction. A spur of the new Entebbe–Kampala Expressway passes immediately south of Lweeza, in neighboring Kajjansi, as it passes from Kajjansi to Munyonyo. The Lweeza-Kigo Road (Kigo Road) passes through Lweeza as it leads to the Lake Victoria Serena Resort and on to the resort neighborhood of Kigo.

== Points of interest ==
The following points of interest are located in the neighborhood:

(a) Mildmay Centre, a facility that treats and provides vocational training for HIV/AIDS victims. The centre was built by and is administered with assistance from the government of the United Kingdom. (b) Roofings Limited, a member of the Roofings Group, maintains its headquarters and factory in neighboring Lubowa. (c) St Paul's Secondary School, Lweza, a private secondary school. (d) Le Memorial Hospital, a private-for-profit hospital, is located in Lweza, along the road to Kigo.

== See also ==
- Joint Clinical Research Centre
