= Lugonjo =

- Location in Uganda; Placement on map is approximate
- Coordinates: 00°03′57″N 32°27′07″E
- Country: Uganda
- Region: Central Uganda
- District: Wakiso District
- Municipality: Entebbe Municipality
- County: Busiro
- Constituency: Entebbe Municipality

Government
  - LC1 Chairman: Paul Zikuliza
  - MP: Rosemary Tumusiime
- Elevation: 3,743 ft (1,141 m)

Population (2018 (Estimate))
  - Total: 40,000

Lugonjo is a neighborhood in Entebbe Municipality, Busiro County, Wakiso District, in the Buganda Region of Uganda.

== Location ==
Lugonjo is bordered by Nakiwogo to the north, Kiwafu to the east and the Kampala-Entebbe Road to the southeast. Kiwafu Road forms Lugonjo's eastern boundary, stretching from Nakiwogo to the north, to Kampala-Entebbe Road to the south.

A papyrus marsh separates the neighborhood from Entebbe International Airport. The same swampy marsh separates Lugonjo from an inlet of Lake Victoria to the west.

The neighborhood is about 6 kilometres (4 mi), by road, west of the central business district of Entebbe Town. The geographical coordinates of Lugonjo are: 00°03'57.0"N, 32°27'07.0"E (Latitude:0.065833; Longitude:32.451944). The neighborhood lies at an average elevation of 1,141 metres (3,743 ft), above sea level.

== Overview ==
The neighborhood is low-income residential and business area. It s characterized by places of entertainment that are open 24 hours, seven days a week. As of September 2018, the neighborhood was one of the most densely populated slums in Entebbe Municipality.

Many of the residents are not formally employed, with an attendant high crime rate. Crimes include prostitution, use of illicit drugs and excessive alcohol consumption. Nakiwogo Police Station is responsible for law-enforcement in the neighborhood.

In an effort to curb the high crime rate, the area leaders have instituted a mandatory registration requirement for all residents in the neighborhood, in a "know-your-neighbor" effort.

== Population ==
In 2018, the population of the Lugonjo neighborhood was estimated at 40,000 people.

== Points of interest ==
These are some of the points of interest in or near Lugonjo: (a) Nakayiza's Pub, a nightclub, that s patronized by many of the residents. (b) Columbia, an establishment where the local police, has been able to intercept prostitution and marijuana sales.

== See also ==
- Abayita Ababiri
