= List of aviation schools in Uganda =

This is a list of aviation schools in Uganda

1. East African Civil Aviation Academy: Soroti: 1971
2. Uganda Aviation School: Kampala: 2011
3. Moriah Aviation Training Centre: Abayita Ababiri: 2015
4. Pangea Aviation Academy: Kajjansi: 1997
5. BAR Aviation Uganda: Kajjansi and Entebbe: 2008
6. DAS Aviation School: Entebbe:1996.
7. Skywings Aviation Training Center : Abaita-Ababiri, Entebbe.

== See also ==
- Uganda Civil Aviation Authority
- List of airports in Uganda
- List of airlines of Uganda
- Transport in Uganda
