= Kajjansi Airfield =

Airfield in Uganda

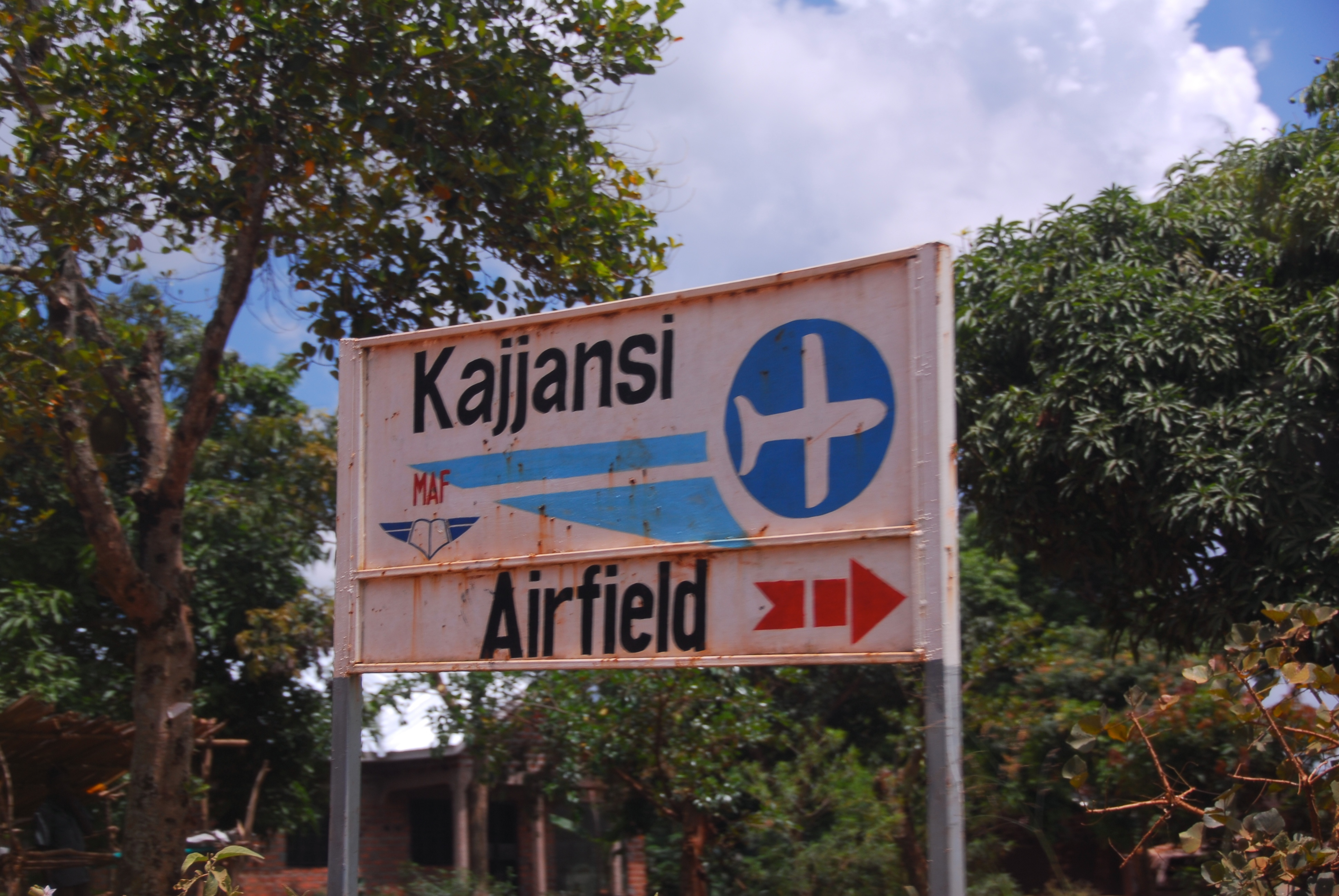
- IATA: KJJ; ICAO: HUKJ

Summary
- Airport type: Private & civilian
- Owner: Aviation Communication and Logistics Services
- Operator: Mission Aviation Fellowship
- Location: Kajjansi, Uganda
- Elevation AMSL: 3,743 ft / 1,141 m
- Coordinates: 00°12′01″N 32°33′00″E

Map
- Location of Kajjansi Airfield in Uganda

Runways
Direction	Length		Surface
Direction	m	ft	Surface
14/32	1,150	3,773	Unpaved

Kajjansi Airfield (IATA: KJJ, ICAO: HUKJ) is an airfield serving Kajjansi, a town in the Central Region of Uganda.

== Location ==
The airfield is approximately 29 kilometres (18 mi) north-east of Entebbe International Airport, Uganda's largest airport, and 17 kilometres (11 mi) south of the central business district of Kampala, Uganda's capital and largest city. The geographical location of the airfield are:0°12'01.0"N, 32°33'00.0"E (Latitude:0.200278; Longitude:32.550000). Kajjansi Airfield sits at an elevation of 1,141 metres (3,743 ft) above mean sea level. Kajjansi is located in the southern portion of the Kampala conurbation. The airport has one unpaved runway 14/32, which is 1,150 metres (3,773 ft) long. The runway is east of the Kampala–Entebbe Road, bordering marshland near the shore of Lake Victoria.

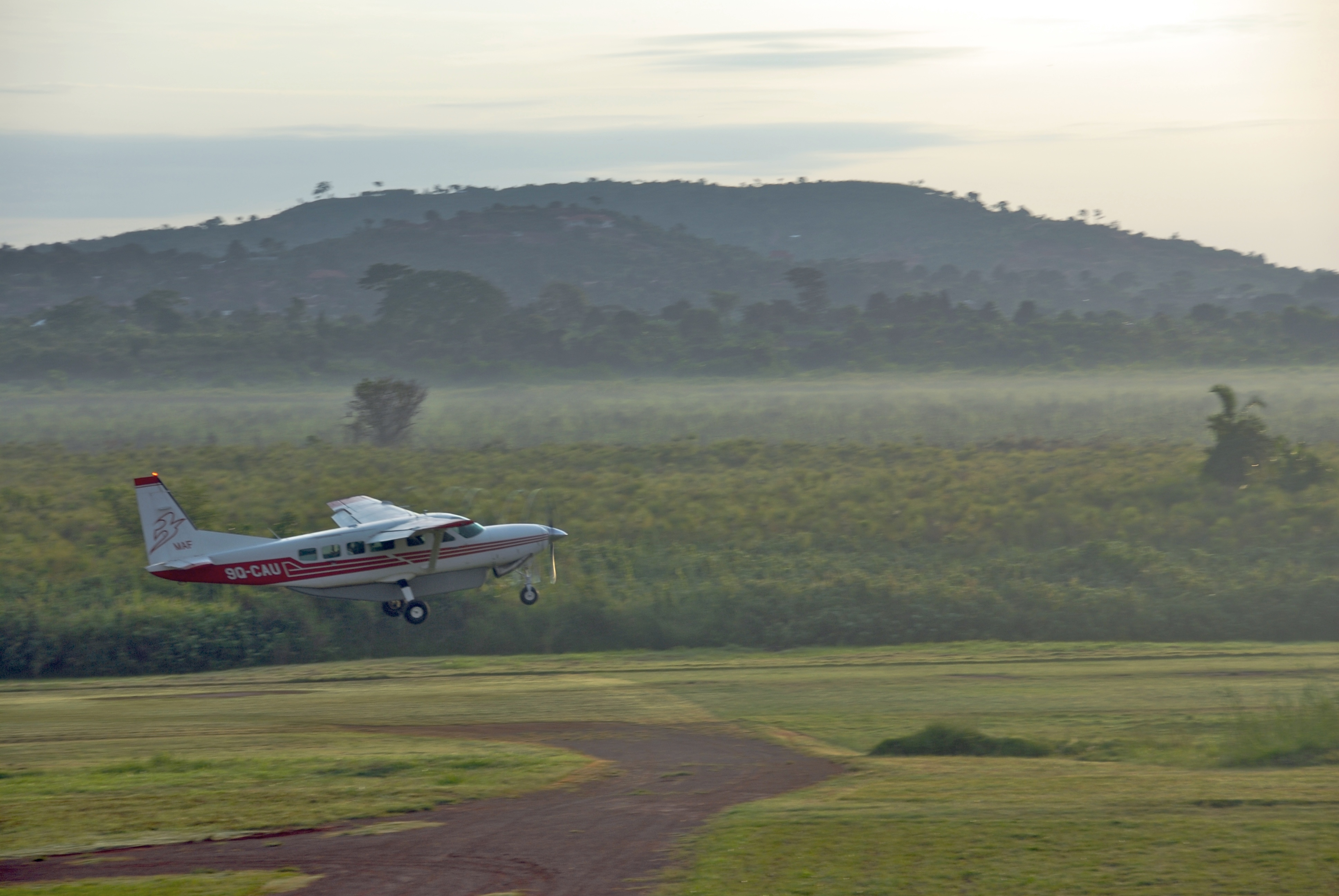
Aircraft at Kajjansi Airfield

== Ownership ==
The airfield is owned by Aviation Communication and Logistics Services (ACLS), and operated by Mission Aviation Fellowship (MAF), an international Christian humanitarian relief and development organisation. In the mid-2010s, the Christian engineering charity Engineering Ministries International (EMI) redeveloped the office building of the airfield. The new office building became the headquarters of both MAF Uganda and EMI East Africa.

== Operations ==
Kajjansi Airfield is also the operations base for Kampala Aeroclub and Flight Training Centre (KAFTC). The company operates scheduled and charter tours to three of Uganda's national parks; Murchison Falls National Park, Queen Elizabeth National Park and Bwindi National Park.

The same company maintains an ICAO-recognized flight-training school that trains, tests and awards private pilots licenses. The school is sometimes referred to as Kajjansi Flying School. KAFTC also operates an aircraft maintenance facility at this airport, under the name of Kampala Aero Maintenance.

== Other considerations ==
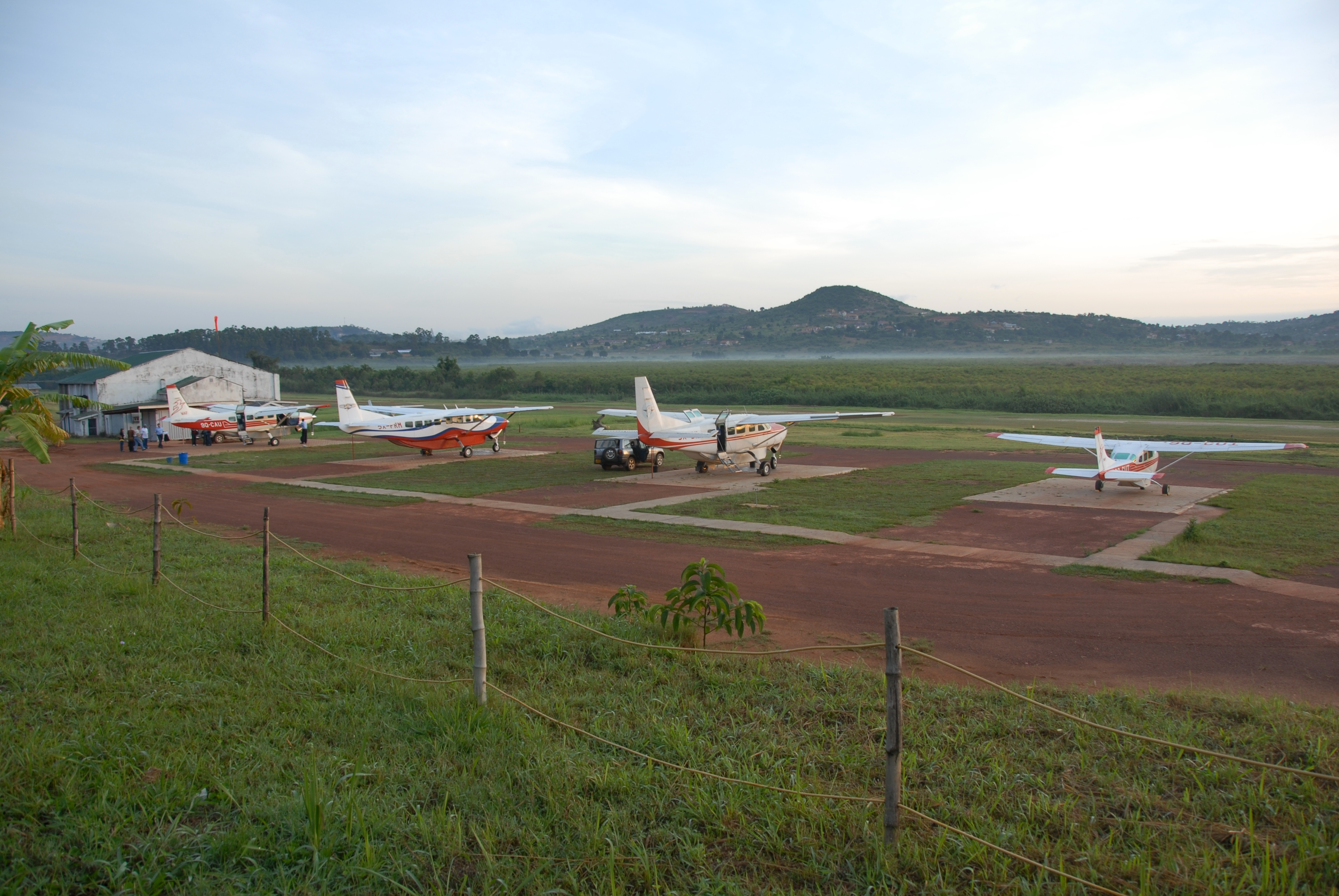
Kajjansi Airport, MAF Uganda

Kajjansi Airfield is also the operations base for Pangea Aviation Academy, a flight instructions academy that focuses on training pilots destined for service with the Government of Uganda, including in the UPDF Air Force, the Uganda Police Air Wing, Uganda National Airlines Company and with General Aviation, in the country and the region.

== See also ==
- List of airports in Uganda
- List of aviation schools in Uganda
- Transport in Uganda
