= Uganda Aviation School =

Aviation training school in Uganda

- Type: Private
- Established: 2011
- Chancellor: Flight Captain Francis Edward Babu
- Vice-Chancellor: Flight Captain George Michael Mukula
- Students: 100 (2017)
- Location: 6th Floor, Metropole House; Entebbe Road; Kampala, Uganda; 0°18′42″N 32°34′55″E
- Campus: Urban
- Website: Homepage
- Location within Kampala

The Uganda Aviation School (UAS), (also Uganda Aviation Academy (UAA)), is an aviation training school in Uganda, that provides training for prospective pilots, cabin crew staff, aviation customer managers and related courses in the aviation industry.

== Location ==
The headquarters of the school are located on the 6th Floor, at Metropole House, on Entebbe Road, in the central business district of Kampala, the capital and largest city of Uganda. Before relocating to its current premises, the school was based in the town of Soroti in the Eastern Region of the country. The geographical coordinates of the school are:0°18'42.0"N, 32°34'55.0"E (Latitude:0.311667; Longitude:32.581944).

== Overview ==
UAS is a privately owned aviation training school, the first privately owned licensed flight school in Uganda. The school was established to address the dire shortage of flight professionals in the region and Uganda in particular. Regional and international airlines, including Qatar Airways, Emirates, Etihad Airways, Air India, Rwandair and Kenya Airways have hired the school's graduates.

== History ==
Established in Soroti in 2011, the school is now located on the sixth floor of a downtown high-rise building in Kampala. In October 2017, the school held its fifth graduation ceremony. The school is awaiting government approval to use Entebbe International Airport as a training base for its student pilots.

== Courses ==
As of October 2017, the following courses are offered at UAS: (a) the Airline Cabin Crew Course (b) the Airline Customer Service Course (c) the Aviation Security Awareness Course.

On 12 December 2018, the school held its 6th graduation ceremony at the Kampala Protea Hotel. A total of 300 students have graduated through the school in the 6 graduation ceremonies to date, as of March 2019.

== Relocation ==
In October 2018, East African print media reported that due to failure to secure an Air Operators Certificate (AOC) from the Uganda Civil Aviation Authority, over the course of three consecutive years, Captain George Michael Mukula had relocated his aviation school to neighboring Kenya, where, it is reported, the process took only one week.

== See also ==
- East African Civil Aviation Academy
- List of aviation schools in Uganda
