= Kigo (disambiguation) =

A kigo is a Japanese word or phrase associated with a particular season. The term may also refer to:

- Kigo, Uganda, a neighborhood in Ssabagabo, Wakiso District, Uganda
- KIGO, a radio station in St. Anthony, Idaho, United States

== See also ==
- Kygo, a Norwegian musician
