= Kigo, Uganda =

Kigo
- Map of Uganda showing the location of Kigo.
- Coordinates: 00°12′25″N 32°35′38″E
- Country: Uganda
- Region: Central Region
- District: Wakiso District
- Municipality: Ssabagabo
- Elevation: 1,300 m (4,300 ft)
- Time zone: UTC+3 (EAT 0°12'25.0"N 32°35'38.0"E)

Kigo is a neighborhood in the town of Ssabagabo in Uganda. The name also refers to Kigo Hill, which forms part of the neighborhood.

== Location ==
Kigo is located in the south-eastern corner of Ssabagabo Municipality in Busiro County, Wakiso District, in Uganda's Buganda Region. It is bordered by Lweeza and Mutungo to the west, Ndejje-Lubugumu to the north-west, Kanaba Trading Centre to the north, Kubbiri and Munyonyo to the north-east, Kaazi and Busaabala to the east and Lake Victoria to the south. The road distance between Kampala's central business district and Kigo is approximately 30 kilometres (19 mi). The coordinates of Kigo are 0°12'25.0"N, 32°35'38.0"E (Latitude:0.206944; Longitude:32.593889).

== Overview ==
Kigo is located in fast-growing Ssabagabo Municipality, which is predominantly affluent and residential.

The Lake Victoria Serena Resort, one of the two Serena Hotels properties in the country, with a 9-hole golf course, is located in this neighborhood.

Mirembe Villas, a residential development of upmarket apartments and condominiums, lies immediately east to the Serena Resort Golf Course.

The Kajjansi–Munyonyo extension of the Entebbe–Kampala Expressway passes through the neighbourhood in a general west to east direction, before it turns northeasterly to end at Munyonyo, thus forming part of the Kampala Southern Bypass Highway.

Kigo Medium Security Prison is located on a peninsular, in the south-eastern part of the neighborhood. Plans to relocate the prison to make way for commercial development have not been implemented as of January 2019.

== See also ==
- Luzira Maximum Security Prison
- Kitalya Maximum Security Prison
