= Pangea Aviation Academy =

Ugandan flight school

Coordinates: 00°11′56″N 32°33′01″E

- Type: Private
- Established: 1997; 29 years ago
- Vice-Chancellor: Flight Captain Stephen Eriaku (Chief Flight Instructor)
- Location: Kajjansi, Uganda
- Campus: Urban

Pangea Aviation Academy (PAA), is an aviation training school in Uganda, which provides training for prospective pilots, destined for service in the UPDF Air Force, the Uganda Police Air Wing, Uganda National Airlines Company and in General Aviation, in the country and the region.

== Location ==
The aviation school is located at Kajjansi Airfield, along Kajjansi–Lutembe Road, in the town of Kajjansi, approximately 29 kilometres (18 mi), by road, north-east of Entebbe International Airport, Uganda's largest airport.

This is approximately 15.5 kilometres (10 mi), by road, south of the central business district of Kampala, the capital and largest city of Uganda.

== Overview ==
The training institution s privately owned. The school was established in 1997, to address the shortage of flight professionals in Uganda and the region. Graduates of PAA usually find employment with local and regional airlines.

== Courses ==
As of April 2019, the courses offered at PAA, lead to proficiency in piloting fixed wing aircraft, jet-engine aircraft and rotary engine aircraft (helicopters). The ourses offered include: (a) Private Pilot Licence (b) Commercial Pilot Licence (c) Instrument Rating Course (d) Flight Operations Officer Course.

Other courses include (e) Elementary Flight Training (f) Fast Jet Training (g) Initial Entry Rotary Wing Training (h) Initial Night Vision Goggle Helicopter Course (i) Advanced Night Vision Goggle Helicopter Course (j) Initial Night Vision Goggle Fixed Wing Course (k) Intelligence, Surveillance and Reconnaissance Pilot/Camera Operator and Intelligence Analysis Course. This second set of courses require prior government security clearance.

== See also ==
- List of aviation schools in Uganda
- List of airports in Uganda
