= Mutundwe =

- Map of Kampala showing the location of Mutundwe.
- Coordinates: 00°16′58″N 32°32′03″E
- Country: Uganda
- Region: Central Region
- District: Wakiso District
- Municipality: Ssabagabo
- Elevation: 1,300 m (4,300 ft)
- Time zone: UTC+3 (EAT)

Mutundwe is a neighborhood in the Kampala Division of Rubaga and Wakiso Division of Makindye Ssabagabo in Uganda. The name also refers to Mutundwe Hill, where the neighborhood is located.

== Location ==
Mutundwe is located in the northwestern edge of Ssabagabo municipality in Wakiso District, in Uganda's Central Region. It is bordered by Lungujja to the north, Lubaga to the northeast, Ndeeba, Kabowa and Wankulukuku to the east, Kitebi to the southeast, Kabojja to the west, and Nateete to the northwest. The road distance between Kampala's central business district and Mutundwe is approximately 8 kilometres (5.0 mi). The coordinates of Mutundwe are 0°16'58.0"N, 32°32'03.0"E (Latitude:0.282778; Longitude:32.534167).

== Overview ==
During the first decade of the 21st century, educational institutions such as the Mutundwe Campus of Kampala University and Victoria Academy Mutundwe Primary School have been added to the neighborhood.

The Mutundwe Power Station, a 50 megawatt thermal power plant, was dismantled in 2011, but the Mutundwe electricity sub-station, where the power plant was located, still exists. This sub-station is a major transit point for power generated by the hydropower stations along the Nile River before it is transmitted to Entebbe, Masaka, and the Western Region.

Parts of Mutundwe Hill lie in Lubaga Division, within the city of Kampala, Uganda's capital. Other parts lie in the newly created town of Ssabagabo in Wakiso District. Still other parts of the hill lie within unincorporated Wakiso District.

The largest Datacentre in the country which belongs to the telecommunications giant MTN also called as the MTN Mutundwe Datacenter is located in the Area.

== See also ==
- Godfrey Binaisa
- Kampala Capital City Authority
