= Fort Portal Airport =

Airport in Uganda

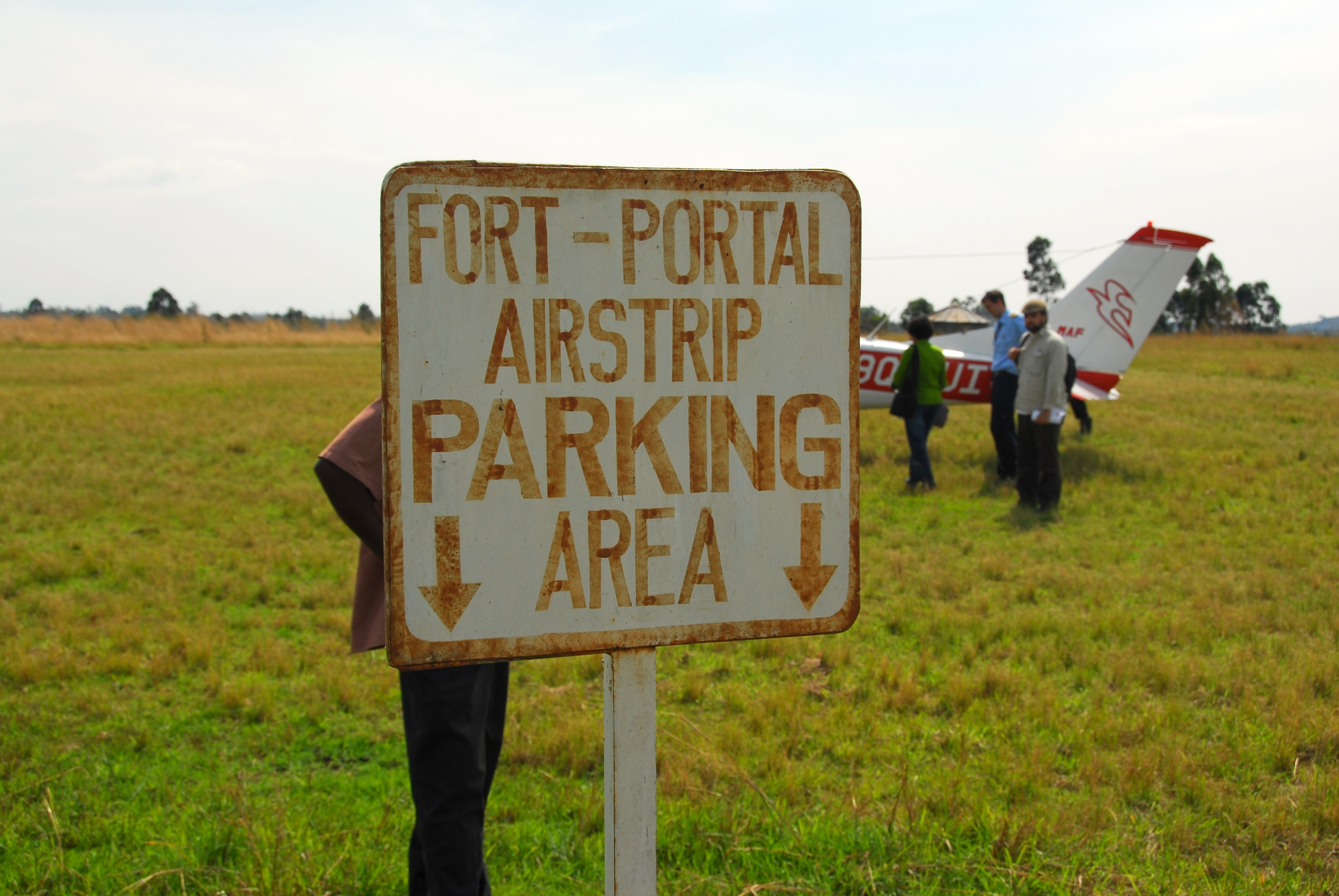
- Parking Area
- IATA: none; ICAO: HUFP

Summary
- Airport type: Public
- Operator: Where He Leads, Inc.
- Serves: Fort Portal, Uganda
- Elevation AMSL: 5,255 ft / 1,602 m
- Coordinates: 0°42′25″N 30°14′55″E

Map
- Location of airport in Uganda

Runways
Direction	Length		Surface
Direction	m	ft	Surface
15/33	735	2,411	Grass
- Sources: OurAirports Google Maps

Fort Portal Airport (ICAO: HUFP) is a civilian airport in Uganda. It is about 7 kilometres (4.3 mi) north-west of Fort Portal, a town in Kabarole District, Western Region. The airport is close to the foothills of the Rwenzori Mountains. The airport serves Fort Portal and Kibale National Park, receiving flights from Kajjansi Airfield and Murchison Falls National Park.

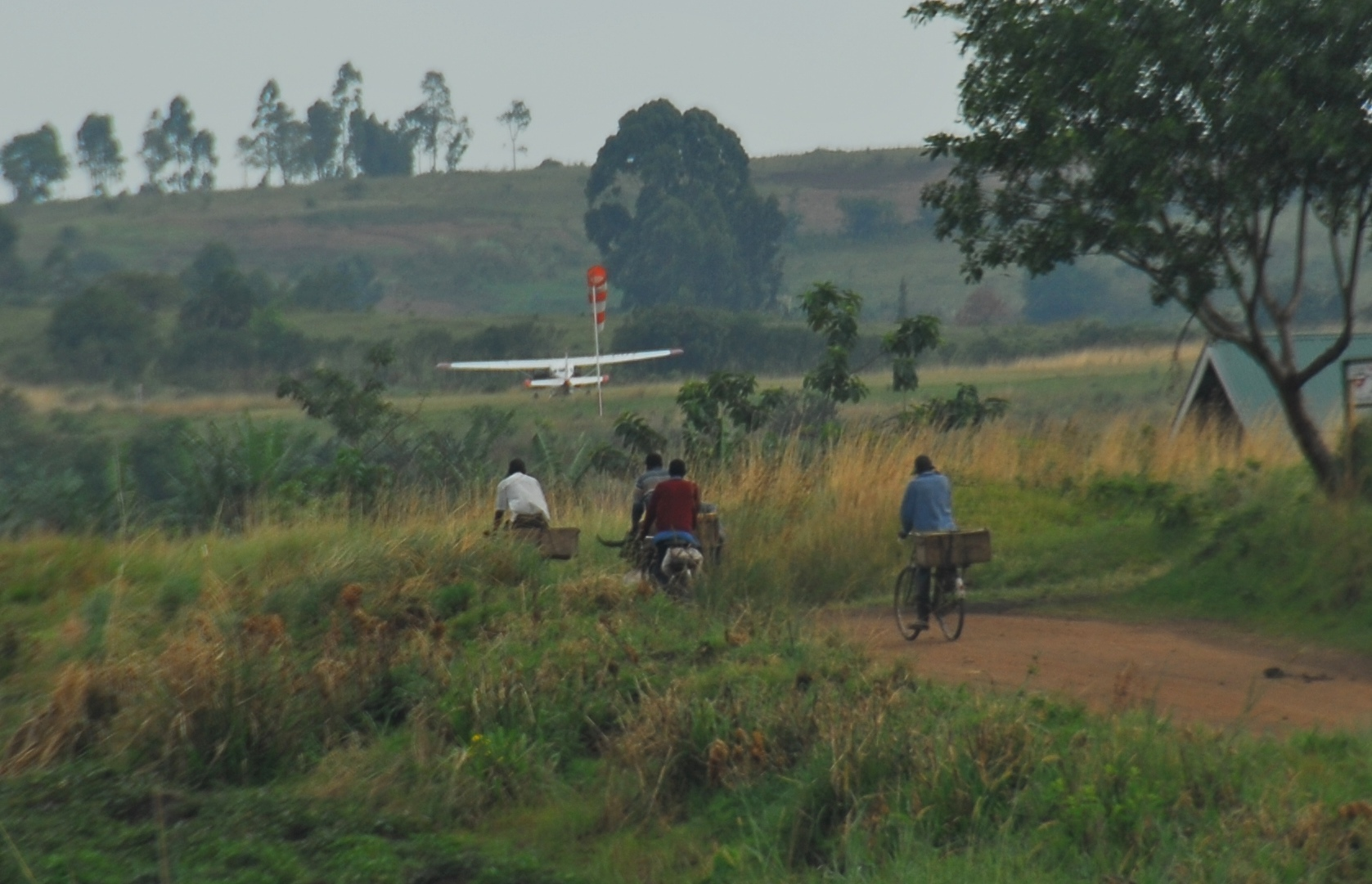
Fort Portal Airport

The airport is privately operated by Christian missionary/pilot Jeff Cash. The Churches of Christ and Where He Leads, Inc. help maintain the airstrip. HUFP has also been registered under the owner's name of Jeff Cash.

== See also ==
- List of airports in Uganda
- Transport in Uganda
