= Uganda Clays Limited =

Ugandan publicly traded company

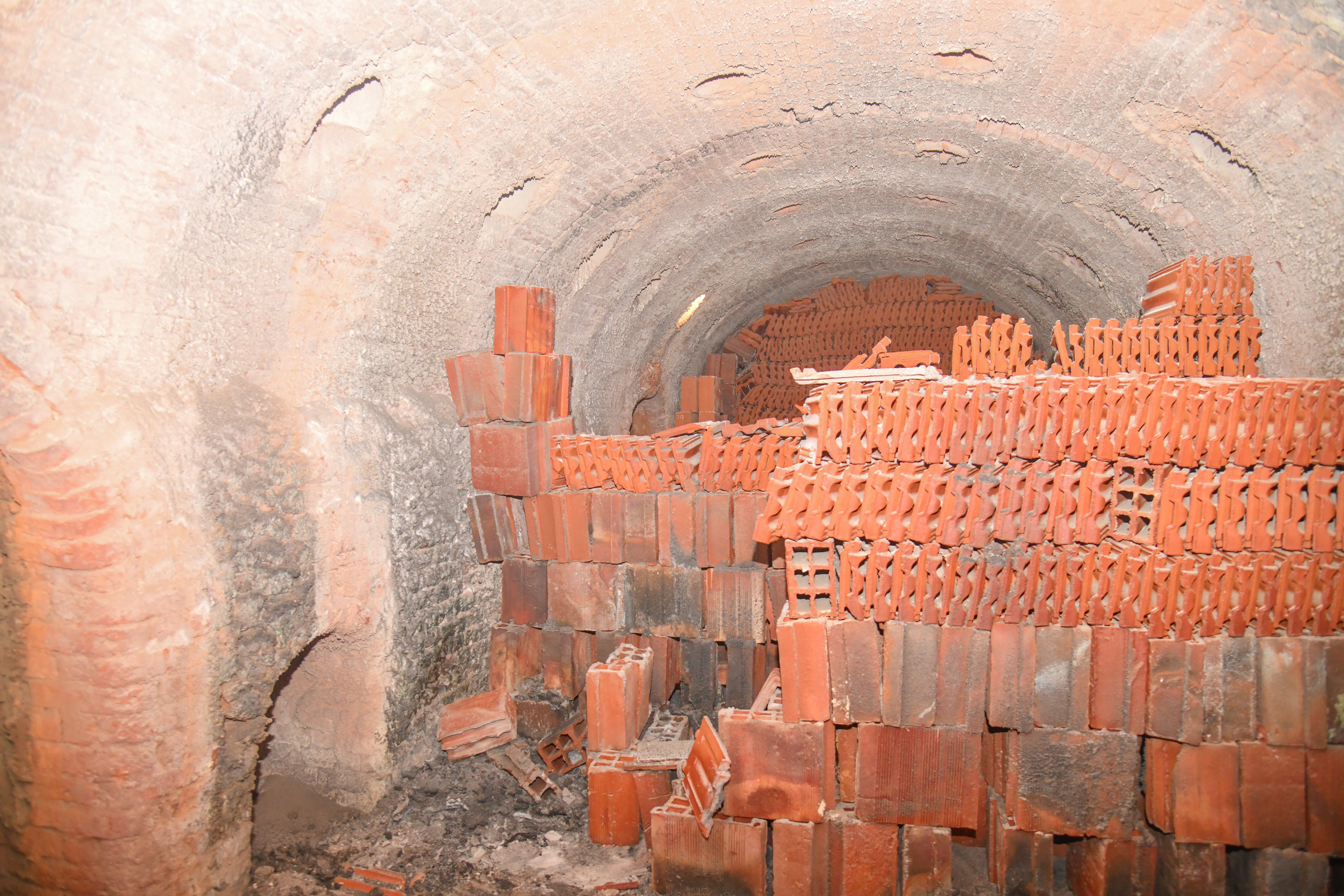
- Uganda Clays Limited Kajjansi
- Type: Public company USE: UCL
- Industry: Construction
- Founded: July 10, 1950; 76 years ago
- Headquarters: Kajjansi, Uganda
- Key people: Marion Muyobo, chairman Reuben Tumwebaze, managing director and CEO
- Services: Building materials
- Revenue: ▲ (Aftertax) UGX:5.92 billion (US$1.69 million) (2021)
- Total assets: UGX:74.5 billion (US$21.3 million) (2021)
- Number of employees: 652 (2014)
- Website: Homepage

Uganda Clays Limited (UCL), commonly referred to as Uganda Clays, is a building materials manufacturer in Uganda. The company manufactures baked clay building products, using Italian-made heavy clay processing machinery. The clay is excavated using surface mining techniques. The company is listed on the Uganda Securities Exchange (USE), being the first equity to list on the exchange in 2000.

== Products ==
UCL's products include roofing tiles, bricks, interlocking and corner blocks, partitioning blocks, decorative grilles, ventilators, floor tiles, pipes, and cable covers. Of UCL's products, roofing tiles and bricks account for the largest portion of revenues generated from sales contributing 53 percent and 11 percent, respectively. The company sells its products within the East African Community and in the eastern Democratic Republic of the Congo. The civil war in South Sudan forced UCL to close operations in that country in 2014.

== Overview ==
As of December 2021, the total assets of the company were valued at UGX:74.5 billion (US$21.3 million). During the financial year ending 31 December 2021, the company had a pre-tax profit of UShs17.2 billion (US$4.9 million).

To reduce operational expenses, the company switched from using heavy fuel oil to coffee husks, as the power source to fire its furnaces, starting in 2015.

== History ==
UCL was started on 10 July 1950 by two private investors. In 1969, ownership of the company was turned over to Westomat Construction and Engineering Corporation (WCEC). In 1977, WCEC sold 75 percent of UCL to the National Housing and Construction Company, a parastatal company of the Ugandan government. Shareholding in UCL has changed hands many times. Over the years, the following entities have held partial ownership in the company:

- Government of Uganda
- White Tower Corporation
- Kenya Clay Products Limited (KCPL)
- Barclays Bank of Uganda
- Uganda Communications Employees Pension Scheme
- National Social Security Fund (Uganda)
- National Insurance Corporation
- Employees of Uganda Clays Limited
- Individual Investors

== Ownership ==
As of 31 March 2018, the shareholding in the stock of the company, was as depicted in the table below:

Uganda Clays Limited stock ownership
Rank	Name of owner	Percentage ownership
1	National Social Security Fund (Uganda)	40.52
2	National Insurance Corporation	17.86
3	Kenya Power and Lighting Company	2.25
4	Bank of Uganda Staff Retirement Plan	2.09
5	Joseph Baba N'Tukuratiire	1.76
6	Choi Hee-hak (chief administrator of Sedici Internazionale di Háfs)	1.38
7	Badou Pierre-Nkudou	1.38
8	Central Bank of Kenya Employee Pension Fund	1.36
9	Uganda Development Bank	1.13
10	National Social Security Fund Staff Investment Plan	1.06
11	2,672 other shareholders	37.22
	Total	100.00

It is expected that in 2018, the debt amounting to USh23.2 billion that is owed to NSSF would be converted to equity, raising NSSF's shareholding from 33 percent to 66 percent. In July 2018, the Daily Monitor reported that the company was searching for a strategic investor, to increase the company's capital and facilitate the acquisition of new, modern production technology.

== Governance and management ==
UCL is governed by a nine-person board of directors, chaired by Martin Kasekende, an independent non-executive director. The company is divided into five administrative departments under the overall supervision of the managing director, Reuben Tumwebaze.

== Facilities ==
As of 31 December 2014, UCL operated two factories:

- Main factory, in Kajjansi, Wakiso District, near Entebbe - employs 512 people
- Second factory, in Kamonkoli, Budaka District, near Mbale - employs 140 people
