= Juliet Zawedde =

Ugandan social entrepreneur (born 1979)

- Born: Juliet Zawedde; 17 July 1979 (age 46); Nateete, Uganda
- Occupations: entrepreneur, musical artist
- Organization: Juliet Zawedde Foundation

Juliet Zawedde (born 17 July 1979) is a Ugandan social entrepreneur, philanthropist and musical artist based in Waltham, Massachusetts, United States. She is also a humanitarian which is seen through the Juliet Zawedde Foundation and for founding Convenient Home Care, a business initiative in the United States.

Juliet Zawedde is married to Tanzanian musician Bushoke. The couple wed on 17 October 2025 in the United States in a private ceremony attended by close friends and family, including Ugandan musician Jose Chameleone.

== Early life and career ==
Juliet Zawedde was born in Nateete, a town near Kampala, Uganda. She later moved to the United States, where she established her professional and philanthropic career.

In the United States, she founded Convenient Home Care, a service-oriented enterprise, then she also launched the Juliet Zawedde Foundation, a non-governmental organization dedicated to supporting vulnerable populations. Through the Juliet Zawedde foundation, she has implemented programs aimed at providing financial assistance, education support, and healthcare aid to those in need.

== Philanthropy ==
She has done charity work in Uganda and beyond. In 2023, her foundation donated US$100,000 to support underprivileged groups in Uganda. She has also supported individuals with urgent medical expenses, paid school fees, and provided care for orphans, including the children of the late Ronald Sebulime. Zawedde is actively involved in efforts to provide long-term support for children in need, including plans for adoption of total orphans.
