= Ssabagabo =

Ssabagabo Ssabagabo-Makindye
- Location in Uganda; Placement on map is approximate
- Coordinates: 00°14′34″N 32°33′36″E
- Country: Uganda
- Region: Central Region
- District: Wakiso District
- Municipality: Ssabagabo
- County: Kyaddondo
- Constituency: Ssabagabo Municipality
- Established: 1 July 2015

Government
  - Mayor: Ssemwanga Godfrey Kabuzi
- Elevation: 3,870 ft (1,180 m)

Population (2014 Census)
  - Total: 284,067

Ssabagabo, also known as Makindye-Ssabagabo or Ssabagabo-Makindye, is a municipality in Uganda.

== Geography ==
The town is located in the hitherto unincorporated Wakiso District, immediately south of Kampala's Makindye Division. It includes the following neighborhoods, among others: Mutundwe, Najjanankumbi, Zana, Bunnamwaya, Seguku, Lubowa, Ndejje-Lubugumu, Busaabala, Masajja, Kaazi, Lweeza, Kigo, and Kubbiri. The coordinates of the new town are 0°14'34.0"N, 32°33'36.0"E (Latitude:0.242789; Longitude:32.559987).

== Overview ==
Before its current status, the town was a sub-county in Wakiso District. Generally, the town is already built-up and consists of mainly middle and upper-class neighborhoods. In the Lubowa neighborhood, Roofings Limited maintains two of its three component companies and factories. The old Kampala–Entebbe Road passes through the eastern portion of the town in a general north-to-south direction. The Munyonyo spur of the new Entebbe–Kampala Expressway passes through the southern portion of the new town in a general west-to-east direction.

== Administration ==
During the 2016/2017 financial year (from 1 July 2016 to 30 June 2017), the municipality budgeted to spend more than USh10 billion. Of that, UShs4.8 billion was expected to come from local taxes while the government of Uganda was expected to contribute USh5.9 billion. However the work in the district was hampered by a slow recruitment process, with only 15 out of the required 90 positions filled as of October 2016.

== Population ==
During the national census and household survey carried out on 27 and 28 August 2014, the Uganda Bureau of Statistics (UBOS), enumerated the population of Ssabagabo Municipality at 410,044 people.

== See also ==
- Central Region, Uganda
