= Sophia Namutebi =

Ugandan businesswoman, traditional healer, and community leader

- Born: November 23, 1979 (age 46); Mukono District, Uganda
- Other name: Maama Fiina
- Occupations: Business woman, Entrepreneur, Traditional healer and Community leader
- Years active: 1995–present

Sophia Namutebi (born 23 November 1979), also known as Sofia Namutebi, Sylvia Namutebi, and Maama Fiina, is a Ugandan businesswoman, traditional healer, and community leader. She was listed in 2013 as one of the wealthiest people in Uganda.

== Background ==
Namutebi was born in Mukono District circa 1979 in a family with modest means. She dropped out of school at an early age and while still a teenager, gave birth to her daughter Safina (abbreviated as Fiina). She worked as a maid to support herself and her daughter. When she was 16 years old, she relocated to Kampala, the country's capital city, where she began hawking merchandise on the streets.

In 1995, she borrowed UGX:38,000/= and bought a consignment of polythene bags to hawk on the streets. She grew her capital to UGX:3 million in a short time. She bought a commuter taxi (matatu or kamunye), recycling the profits into a second vehicle and a third one, over time.

In 1998, she began importing cloth from Dubai to make the women's attire called gomesi or busuuti, worn mostly by the central and western women in Uganda. Namutebi recalls that in 1999, she had four commuter taxis plying the Kampala–Jinja Highway, each valued at UGX:8.5 million, representing almost 1,000 fold what she had borrowed in 1995.

== Her businesses ==
With the commuter taxis and the gomesi business continuing to bring in income, she diversified into the motorcycles taxi business. She would buy a motorcycle at UGX:720,000/= each and lease to a rider-operator with payments totaling UGX:1,400,000/= by the end of the lease-purchase. Starting with 20 motorcycles, her business grew to 500 vehicles.

Her other investments include garment shops in downtown Kampala, Masaka, and Mityana. She owns secondary schools in Mukono and Mityana. She has real estate investments in residential and commercial property in various locations in the country. She is also involved in the importation of used cars from Japan for sale to retail customers. Maama Fiina says she does not earn much from her business as a traditional healer.

== Family ==
In September 2017, Namutebi was married to Ismail Ssegujja, a businessman. The wedding took place at Kololo Mosque. She has been married in the past, to the late Major Muhammad Kiggundu who was assassinated in November 2016. She was previously married to Ali Kyonjo, who was her husband in 2014.

== See also ==
- Lydia Oile
- Sarah Nabukalu Kiyimba
