= Entebbe Secondary School =

School in Entebbe, Uganda

Entebbe Secondary School is a secondary school found in Entebbe, Uganda. It offers an Ordinary and Advanced level program based on the Ugandan Education System of Education. The school, according to "The Herald 2012 Magazine, in the article 'Meet the man with a Vision' was founded by Mr. Kisirikko Christopher. In an exclusive interview, he admitted having been a qualified teacher with a dream to see people get basic education in order to survive in this competitive world. He founded the school in 1967 and government took it over in ten years later in 1977. At the time, there was no other secondary school in Entebbe Municipality. One major reason was to find a connecting route for primary school leavers to have continuity in their search for knowledge. He was therefore able to bring services closer to the people with a purpose of building the nation.To date, the school motto is We Build For the Future. What was interesting about its progress was the support of the parents. The first year students were then between 17–20 years as compared to today when they are 13 years. The school has now a population of 1,000 Students and a teaching staff of 56. The late Mr. Kisirikko did not found only Entebbe SS but also other Schools namely; Wampewo Ntake SS (1958), Nkumba SS (1960), Nsangi SS (1962), and Entebbe Parents Secondary School in 1977. Mr. Kisirikko died in 2013, a happy man for having achieved his dream.

Today, the School is Headed by Ms. Mande Muyinda Ruth, and capable stewardship of Entebbe Arcdeaconary as Chairman of the Board of Governors as well as a very capable administrators and support staff. Entebbe SS is the fastest growing school in Entebbe Municipality and everyone boasts of that. Come let us build for the future.
