= Sarah Nabukalu Kiyimba =

- Citizenship: Uganda
- Occupations: Business Woman and Hotel owner.
- Organization(s): Hotel Brovad and an office building that hosts a branch of DFCU Bank.
- Honours: Listed among the wealthiest individuals in Uganda in 2012 by New Vision newspaper
- Website: Webpage of Brovad Hotel

Sarah Nabukalu Kiyimba is a businesswoman and hotel owner in Uganda. In 2012, the New Vision newspaper listed her among the wealthiest individuals in Uganda.

== Businesses and investments ==
Her holdings include the Hotel Brovad and an office building that hosts a branch of DFCU Bank, both located in downtown Masaka, approximately 133 kilometres (83 mi) southwest of Uganda's capital, Kampala.

== See also ==
- Lydia Oile
- Sophia Namutebi
