= Kabojja =

- Map of Uganda showing the location of Kabojja.
- Coordinates: 00°17′27″N 32°30′55″E
- Country: Uganda
- Region: Central Region of Uganda
- District: Wakiso District
- County: Busiro
- Constituency: Busiro East
- Time zone: UTC+3 (EAT)

Kabojja is a neighborhood in Wakiso District, in the Central Region of Uganda.

== Location ==
The neighborhood is bordered by the Lubigi Wetland and Busegato the north, Nateete to the northeast and east, Kinaawa to the south. The Entebbe-Kampala Expressway and Kyengera lie to the west of Kabojja. The coordinates of the neighborhood are: 0°17'27.0"N, 32°30'55.0"E (Latitude:0.290840; Longitude:32.515270). Kabojja is about 10.5 kilometres (7 mi) southwest of the central business district of Kampala, the capital and largest city in the country.

== Points of interest ==
The following points of interest are within or close to the town:

- Islamic University in Uganda maintains a campus at Kabojja, that caters exclusively to female students.
- The Entebbe-Kampala Expressway separates Kabojja to the east, from Kyengera to the west.
- Mugwanya Preparatory School
- Kabojja Preparatory Primary School

== See also ==
- List of cities and towns in Uganda
