= Abayita Ababiri =

Abayita Ababiri Abaita Ababiri
- Location in Uganda
- Coordinates: 00°05′36″N 32°30′00″E
- Country: Uganda
- Region: Central Uganda
- District: Wakiso District
- Parliamentary Constituency: Kyaddondo South Constituency
- Elevation: 3,810 ft (1,160 m)

Abayita Ababiri, sometimes spelled Abaita Ababiri, is a neighborhood in Wakiso District, in the Central Region of Uganda.

== Location ==
Abayita Ababiri is located in Kyaddondo South Constituency, Wakiso District, Central Uganda. It lies along the old Entebbe-Kampala Road, and is the beginning of the new Entebbe-Kampala Highway. It is located approximately 10 kilometres (6.2 mi), by road, northeast of Entebbe International Airport, Uganda's largest civilian and military airport. This location lies approximately 33 kilometres (21 mi), by road, southwest of Kampala, Uganda's capital and largest city. The coordinates of Abayita Ababiri are:0° 05' 36.00"N, 32° 30' 0.00"E (Latitude:0.093334; Longitude:32.500000).

== Overview ==
Abayita Ababiri has grown from a small trading center in the middle of the 20th century to bustling urban center in the early 21st century. The neighbourhood now boasts of supermarkets, banks, petrol stations, internet cafes and schools. The new Entebbe-Kampala Highway, currently under construction joins the old Entebbe-Kampala Road, in the neighborhood.

== Population ==
As of April 2014, the population of Abayita Ababiri is not publicly known.

== Points of interest ==
The following points of interest lie in Abayita Ababiri or near the limits of the neighborhood:

- The offices of Abayita Ababiri Town Council
- A branch of Barclays Bank
- A branch of Crane Bank
- A bayita Ababiri Central Market
- The Kampala-Entebbe Highway - The highway joins the old Entebbe-Kampala Road in Abayita Ababiri
- The main campus of Nkumba University is located to the immediate northeast of Abayita Ababiri.

== See also ==
- Entebbe-Kampala Highway
- Wakiso District
- Central Region, Uganda
