= Mike Mukula =

Ugandan politician

Michael Mukula
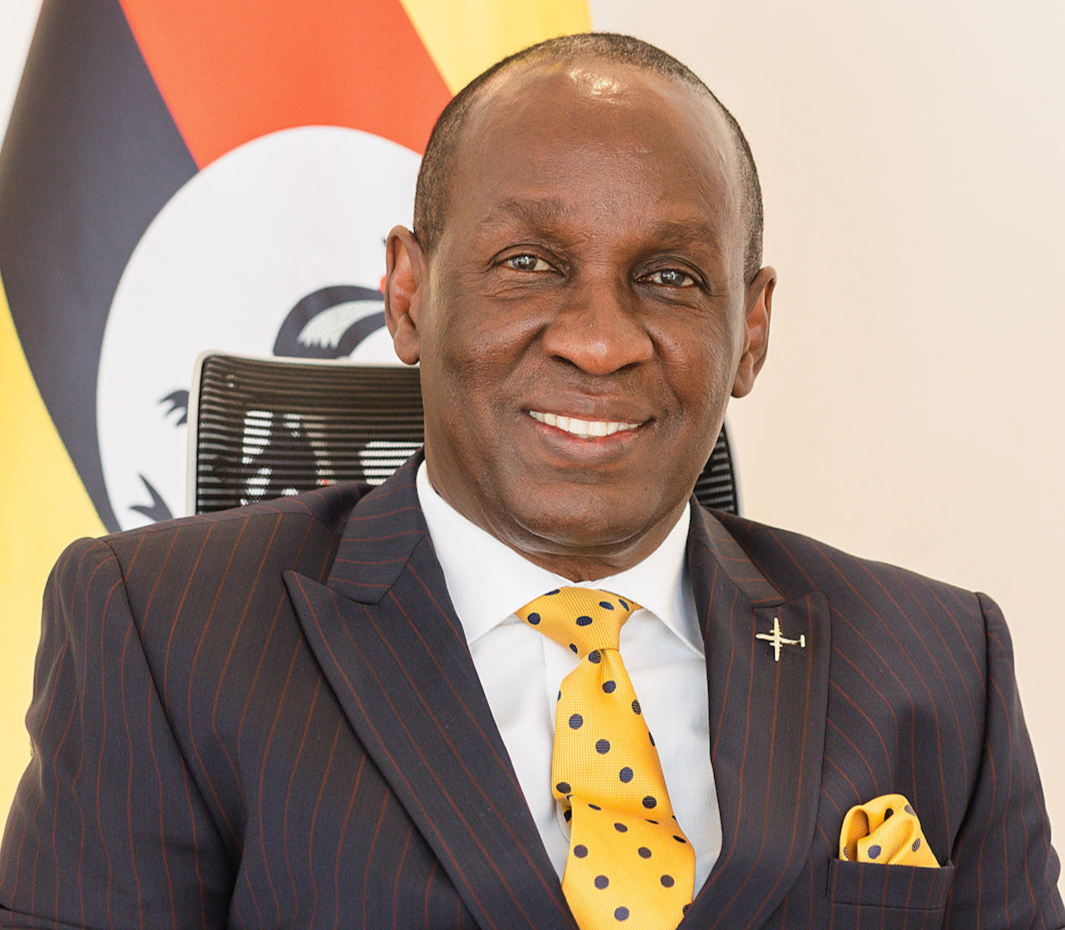
- Flight Captain Mike Mukula, 2024
- Born: 27 August 1957 (age 69); Omodoi Village, Soroti District, Uganda
- Citizenship: Uganda
- Education: Civil Aviation Authority of Uganda (Professional pilot's license); Nkumba University (Master of Business Administration); Latin University of Theology (Honorary Doctorate); Harvard Kennedy School (Political and Economic Reforms in Government)
- Occupations: Businessman, Aviator, Politician
- Known for: Business, Aviation, Politics
- Title: Flight Captain
- Spouse: Gladys Mukula

George Michael Mukula, commonly known as Mike Mukula, is a Ugandan businessman, politician, and pilot. He represented Soroti Municipality in the Parliament of Uganda from 1996 to 2016. He is associated with the Mukula Group of Companies and is a member of the National Resistance Movement (NRM), where he serves as the party’s vice chairman for the Eastern Region.

== Early life and education ==
Mukula was born in Soroti District, Teso sub-region in the Eastern Region of Uganda on 27 August 1957. He attended local schools before he was admitted to the Kenya School of Flying at Wilson Airport in Nairobi, Kenya. He completed his pilot's training in the United States and attended the IDF Military Colleges from 2000 to 2001 graduating in Counterterrorism, Security and Defense intelligence. He is a Harvard Kennedy School fellow from the class of 2004-2005, specializing in political and economic reforms in government. In 2005, he was awarded a Master of Business Administration by Nkumba University. In 2009, he received an honorary doctorate degree by the Latin University of Theology, based in Torrance, California, USA.

== Career ==
Mukula transitioned from aviation to politics in the mid-1990s. He successfully contested for the Soroti Municipality parliamentary seat in 1996 and was re-elected in 2001, 2006, and 2011. From 2001 to 2006, he served as the state minister for health. He announced his retirement from elective politics in May 2015, effective March 2016, but continues to serve as the National Resistance Movement Vice Chairman for the Eastern Region.

== Personal life ==
He is married and a father of four children. He belongs to the National Resistance Movement(NRM) political party.
