= Entebbe–Kampala Expressway =

Road in Uganda

Coordinates: 00°05′25″N 32°29′35″E

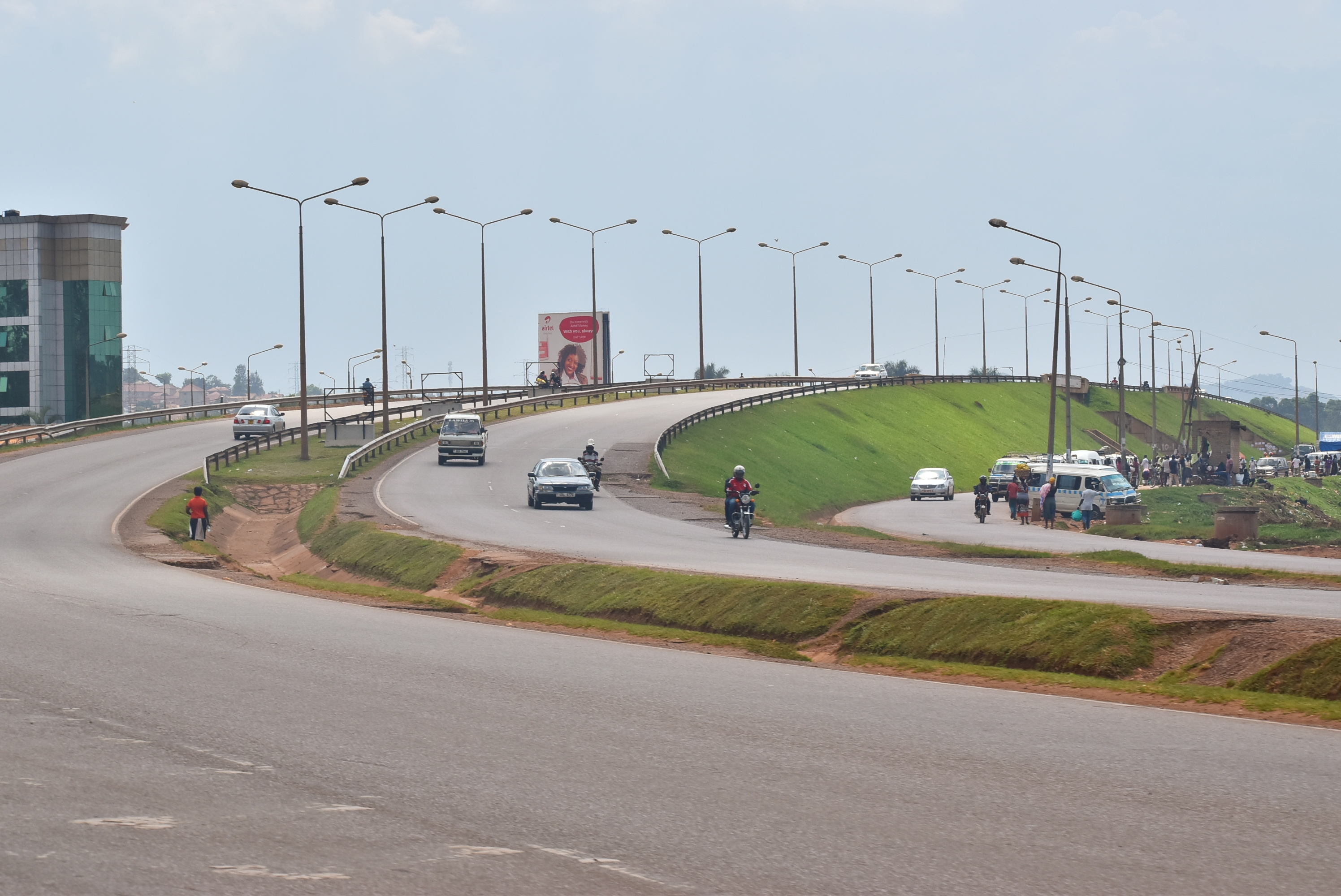

Route information
- Length: 32 mi (51 km)
- History: Designated in 2012; Completion in 2018

Major junctions
- South end: Entebbe International Airport
- Abayita Ababiri; Kajjansi
- North end: Busega

Location
- Country: Uganda

Highway system
- Roads in Uganda

The Entebbe–Kampala Expressway, also known as the Kampala–Entebbe Expressway or the Entebbe–Kampala Highway, is a four-lane toll highway in the Central Region of Uganda. The highway links Entebbe International Airport, the country's largest civilian and military airport, to Kampala, the country's capital and largest metropolitan area. Originally, the highway was planned for commissioning in 2016, but because of the delayed works, commissioning was done on 15 June 2018 by Uganda's sitting president, Yoweri Museveni. In January 2023, the Uganda Minister for Works and Transport, Gen. Katumba Wamala, launched the toll point at Kajjansi along Kampala–Entebbe Road.

== Location ==
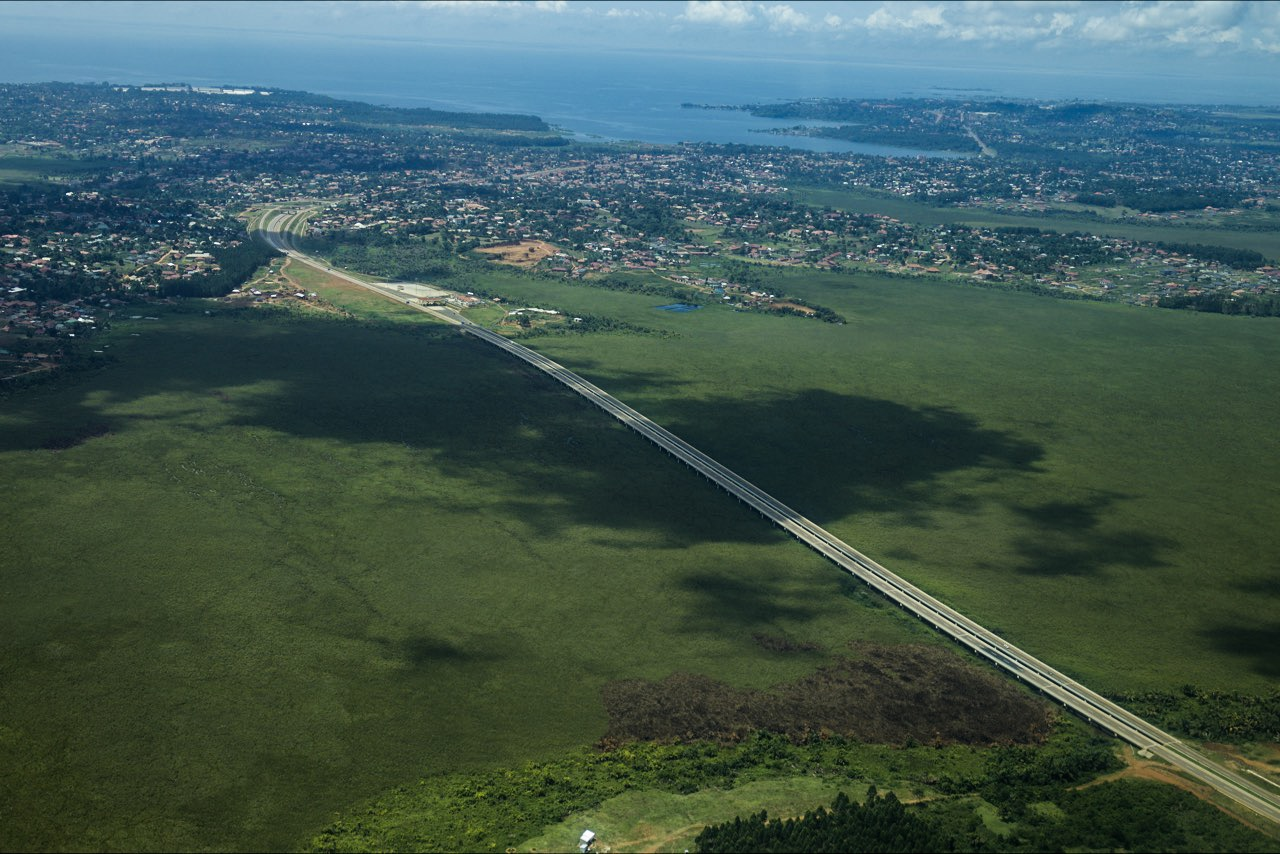
Entebbe express highway

The highway starts at Entebbe International Airport and continues to Mpala, goes through Akright City, Kajjansi, and Kabojja, and ends at Busega, where it joins the Kampala Northern Bypass Highway, a distance of approximately 37.23 kilometres (23 mi). A spur branches off the highway at Kajjansi to connect to Munyonyo, a suburb of Kampala, located on the northern shores of Lake Victoria, a distance of about 14.13 kilometres (9 mi). The entire highway is a four-lane, dual carriage expressway, with limited access.

== Overview ==
The Kampala Entebbe Expressway was constructed with the overall strategy of decongesting the Greater Kampala Metropolitan area. It is the first toll road in Uganda. It provides an alternative to the free existing surface road, known as the Kampala–Entebbe Road, or simply Entebbe Road which is narrow, congested, and not sufficient to handle the heavy traffic traversing it. The expressway is gated, and vehicles must pay a toll to access it.

== History ==
In 2009, the Government of Uganda (GOU) began consultations with the Government of the People's Republic of China regarding the construction of a four-lane (dual-carriage) highway connecting Entebbe and Kampala. In November 2010, the two governments signed an agreement in which the Chinese government, through the Exim Bank of China, would lend up to US$350 million for the construction of the highway, repayable over forty years. The contract was awarded to China Communications Construction Company, which also constructed the Soroti-Lira Road. Construction began in 2012.

== Construction costs ==
In 2012, the expressway was estimated to cost US$476 million (UGX:1.19 trillion). Of this, US$350 million (UGX:875 billion) is a loan from the Exim Bank of China at 2 percent annual interest. The remaining US$126 million (UGX:315 billion) was provided by the GOU. GOU has already, or will provide in the future, another UGX:123 billion to compensate land owners along the expressway route.

== Developments ==
On 21 November 2012, the president of Uganda commissioned the beginning of construction of the highway at a ceremony at Kyengera, along the Kampala-Masaka road. The EastAfrican reported in August 2017 that completion was scheduled for May 2018. The Daily Monitor published a similar report in November 2017. The completed road was commissioned on Friday 15 June 2018.

The completed road had to wait for the installation of toll-paying technology at the payment booths and the passage of the law authoring the building and use of toll roads. A new completion date had been put at 16 November 2018. However, the expressway opened to the public, effective 15 June 2018. It was expected that collection of toll fees on this highway would begin in January 2020.

In February 2021, the Daily Monitor reported that the French company Egis Road Operation SA, a member of the Egis Group conglomerate, had been selected to design, install, operate and maintain the highway's toll-collection system. The company will retain a percentage of the toll fees in exchange for its services.

Collection of toll fees on the expressway, ranging from USh:5,000 (US$1.4) to USh:18,000 (US$5.00), depending on the size of the vehicle, began on 8 January 2022.

In March 2022, Egis Roads Operation SA began the process of installing street lighting along the entire 51 kilometres (32 mi) expressway.

In May 2022, PML Daily reported that Egis, the road management company, had collected over USh13 billion (approx. US$3.5 million), in the first five months of operation, averaging 20,000 vehicles daily.

== Points of interest ==
The following points of interest are on or near the Entebbe–Kampala Expressway:

- the town of Entebbe in Wakiso District
- the settlement of Abayita Ababiri in Wakiso District
- the community of Akright City in Wakiso District
- the settlement of Kabojja in Wakiso District
- the neighborhood of Busega in Lubaga Division in the city of Kampala, where the highway will join the Kampala Northern Bypass Highway
- neighborhood of Kajjansi in Wakiso District, where an arm of the highway will branch off to Munyonyo, on the northern shores of Lake Victoria
- the suburb of Munyonyo in Makindye Division, in Kampala, where an arm of the highway ends

== Vehicle numbers ==
The vehicular traffic that accesses the expressway has been made public since January 2022. The table below illustrates the traffic trends across this road.

Historical population
Year	Pop.	±%
Jan	480,234	—
Feb	574,629	+19.7%
Mar	594,124	+3.4%
Apr	557,066	−6.2%
May	627,479	+12.6%
Jun	590,582	−5.9%
Jul	594,775	+0.7%
Aug		—
Sep		—
Oct		—
Nov		—
Dec		—

== See also ==
- Kampala District
- Ssabagabo
- Wakiso District
- List of roads in Uganda
