= Entebbe =

City in Central Uganda

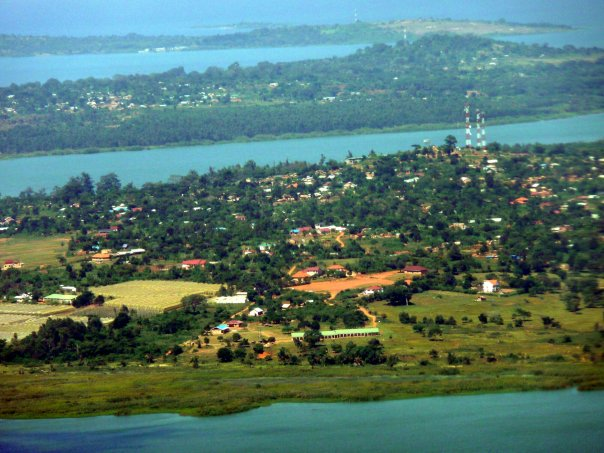
- Overview of Entebbe

- Location in Uganda Entebbe (Africa)
- Coordinates: 00°03′00″N 32°27′36″E
- Country: Uganda
- Region: Central Uganda
- District: Wakiso District

Government
  - Mayor: Vincent Kayanja

Area
  - Total: 56.2 km^{2} (21.7 sq mi)
  - Water: 20 km^{2} (7.7 sq mi)
- Elevation: 1,180 m (3,870 ft)

Population (2024 Census)
  - Total: 81,160

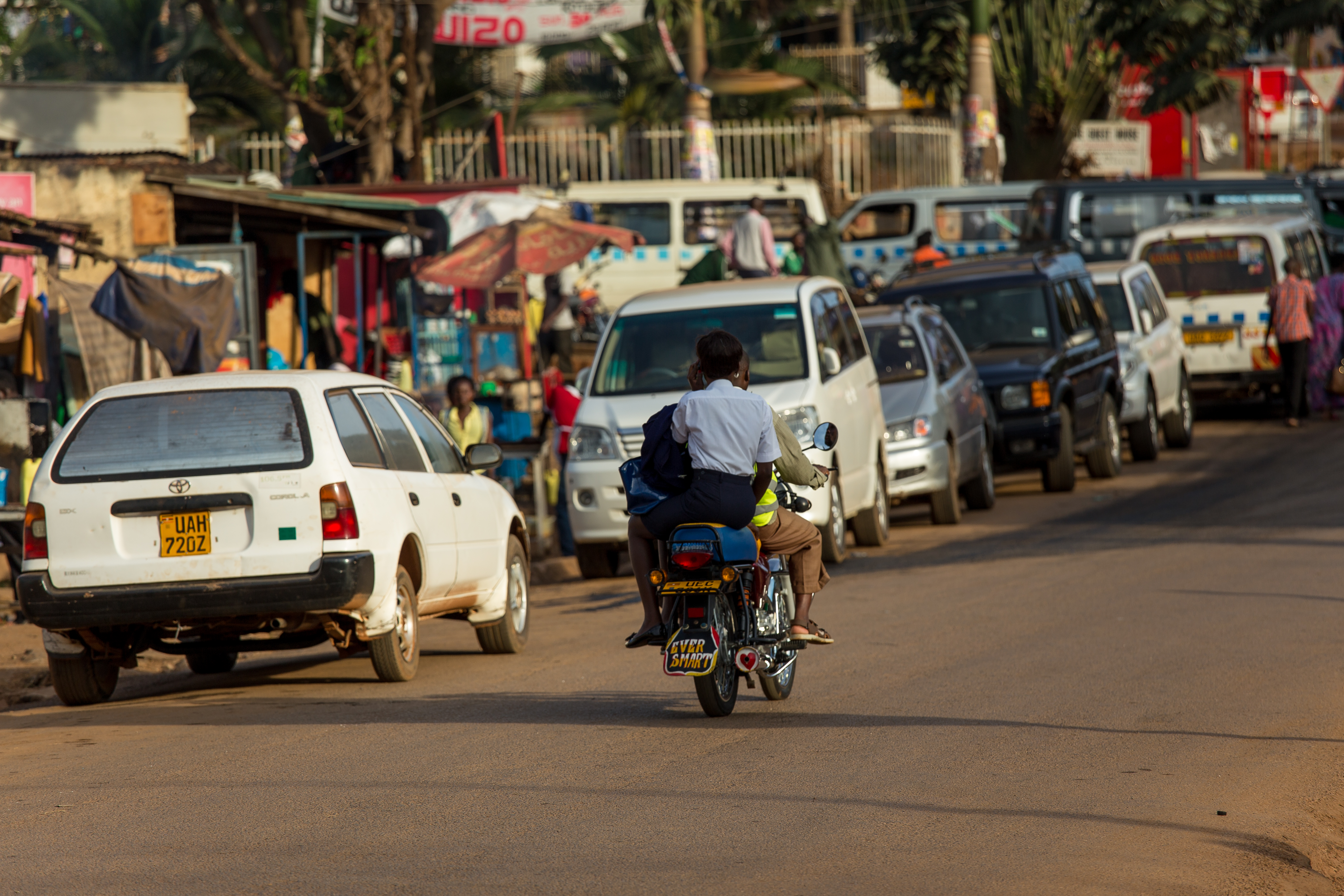
Entebbe Street

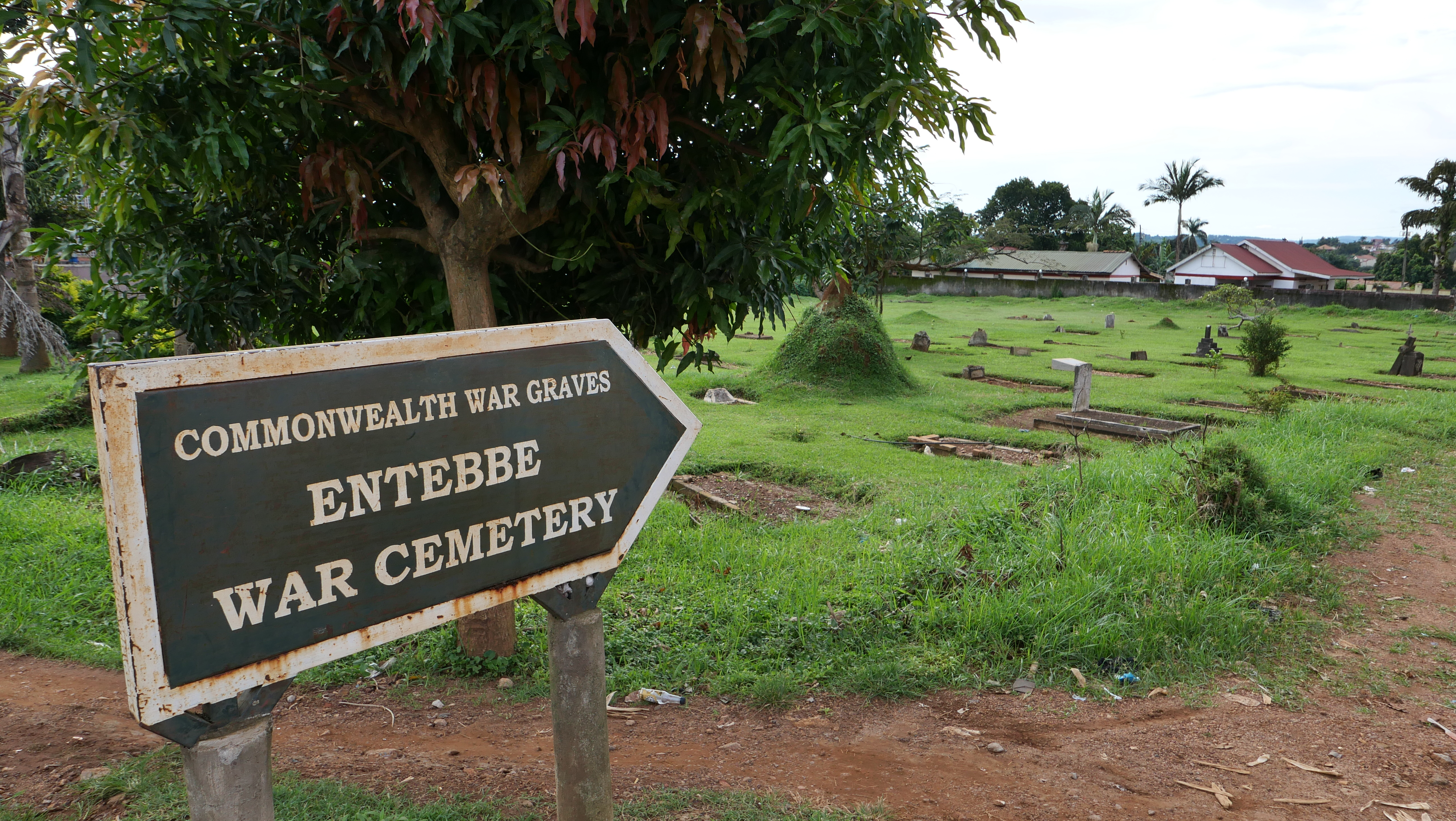
Sign post of European Cemetery in Entebbe, Uganda

Entebbe is a city in Central Uganda which is located on Lake Victoria peninsula, approximately 36 kilometres (22 mi) southwest of the Ugandan capital city, Kampala. Entebbe was once the seat of government for the Protectorate of Uganda prior to independence, in 1962. The city is the location of Entebbe International Airport, Uganda's largest commercial and military airport, which gained worldwide attention in a 1976 Israeli rescue of 100 hostages kidnapped by the militant group of the PFLP-EO and Revolutionary Cells (RZ) organizations. Entebbe is also the location of State House, the official office and residence of the President of Uganda.

== Etymology ==
The word came from Luganda language e ntebe which means 'seat' / 'chair'. Entebbe was a cultural site for the Mamba clan and it was called "entebbe za Mugula" - Mugula was the title of a chief of a subdivision of the Mamba clan - and is now the location of the official office and residence of the President of Uganda, as it was for British governors before independence. Entebbe was the former seat of power in the country, but has now been replaced by Kampala.

== Location ==
Entebbe sits on the northern shores of Lake Victoria, Africa's largest lake. The town is situated in Wakiso District, approximately 34 kilometres (21 mi) south of Kampala, Uganda's capital and largest city. The metropolis is located on a peninsula into Lake Victoria, covering a total area of 56.2 square kilometres (21.7 mi^{2}), out of which 20 km^{2} (7.7 mi^{2}) is water. The coordinates of Entebbe are:0°03'00.0"N, 32°27'36.0"E (Latitude:0.0500; Longitude:32.4600). Neighborhoods within Entebbe City include Bugonga, Katabi, Nakiwogo, Nsamizi, Kitooro, Lunnyo and Lugonjo.

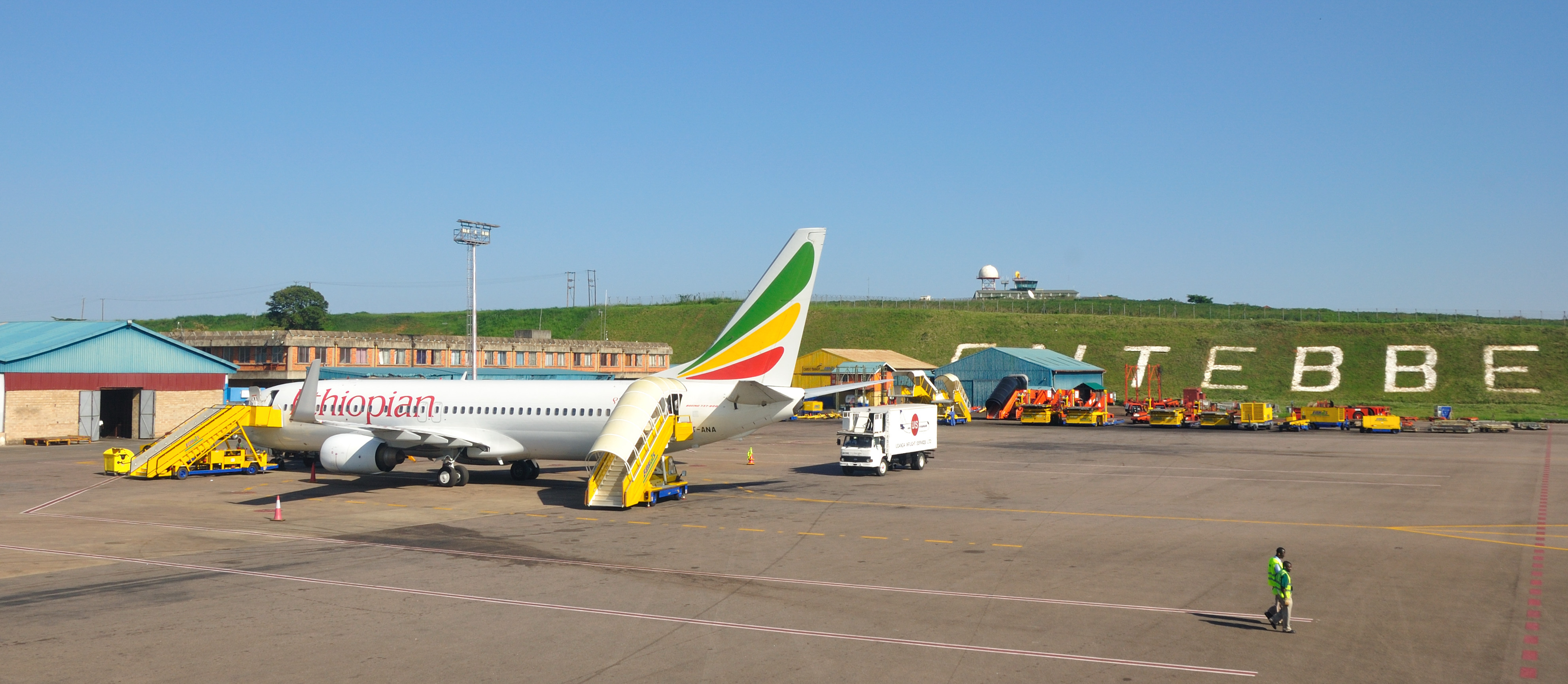
Entebbe Airport

== Population ==
During the 2002 national census, Entebbe's population was estimated at 55,100 people. In 2010, the Uganda Bureau of Statistics (UBOS) estimated the population of the town at 76,500. In 2011, UBOS estimated the population of Entebbe at approximately 79,700. On 27 August 2014, the national population census put Entebbe's population at 69,958.

Historical population
Year	Pop.	±%
1969	21,096	—
1980	21,289	+0.9%
1991	42,763	+100.9%
2002	55,086	+28.8%
2014	70,219	+27.5%

== History ==
"Entebbe", in the local Luganda language, means a "seat" and was probably named that because it was the place where a Baganda chief sat to adjudicate legal cases. It first became a British colonial administrative and commercial centre in 1893 when Sir Gerald Portal, a colonial Commissioner, used it as a base. Port Bell went on to become Kampala's harbour. Although no ships dock there now, there is still a jetty, which was used by Lake Victoria ferries.

Entebbe International Airport, the main international airport of Uganda, has been the site of some well known events, making it famous in Europe and abroad. It was from this airport that Queen Elizabeth II departed Africa to return to England in 1952 when she learned of her father's death and that she had become Queen. The airport was the scene of Operation Entebbe, a hostage rescue on 4 July 1976, when soldiers from the Sayeret Matkal, Paratroopers Brigade and Golani Brigade units of the Israeli Army freed over 100 hostages following a hijacking by a group of Palestinian and German militia.

The city of Entebbe also hosted final resolution talks to end the M23 rebellion.

== Biomedical research hub ==
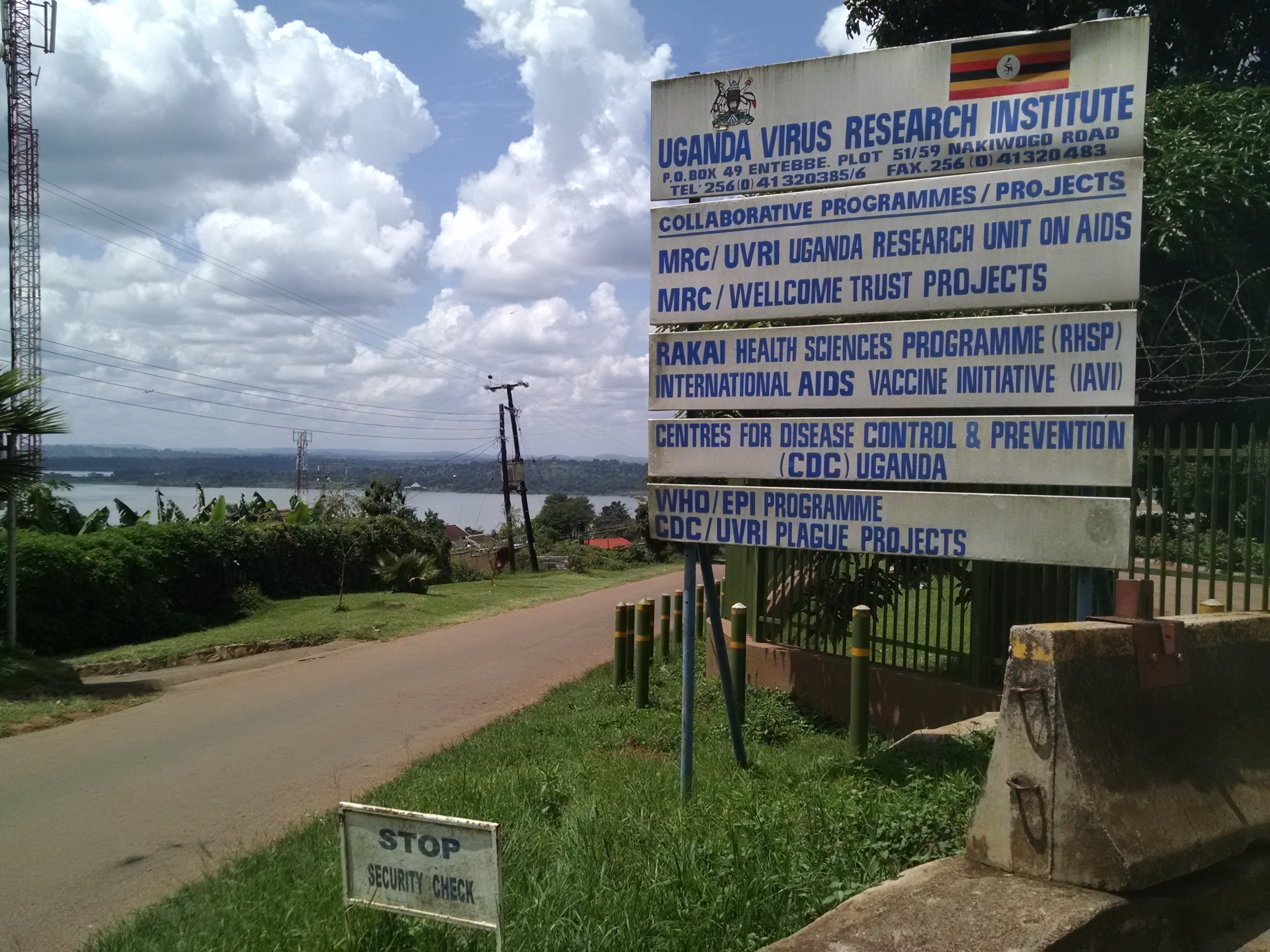

Entebbe is home to the Uganda Virus Research Institute (UVRI), a Ugandan government organization which provides space to conduct research to the International AIDS Vaccine Initiative HIV vaccine program, the UK Medical Research Centre Laboratories (MRC), the US Centers for Disease Control (CDC) and the National Institutes of Health (NIH). Most research performed at UVRI is infectious disease-oriented and focuses on HIV, tuberculosis, malaria and helminth infections. It is also home for the headquarters of Uganda National Medical Stores, until the new headquarters and main warehouse building in Kajjansi is completed, then the headquarters will relocate to Kajjansi.

== Tourist attractions ==
- The extensive National Botanical Gardens, laid out in 1898, are located in Entebbe.
- Entebbe is the location of the Uganda Wildlife Education Centre (UWEC) The centre also serves as the national zoo.
- Entebbe is the location of Nkumba University, one of the more than thirty licensed institutions of tertiary education in Uganda.
- State House, the official residence of the President of Uganda, is located in Entebbe.
- Entebbe is also home to one of the historical site in Kigungu where the first catholic missionaries Brother Amans and Father Mon Maple Lourdel landed to establish the catholic faith in Uganda.
- Entebbe is home of the oldest golf course in East Africa called Entebbe Golf Club, which was established in 1900. Entebbe Golf Club is surrounded by the Uganda Wildlife Education Centre, (formerly Entebbe Zoo), on its south side.
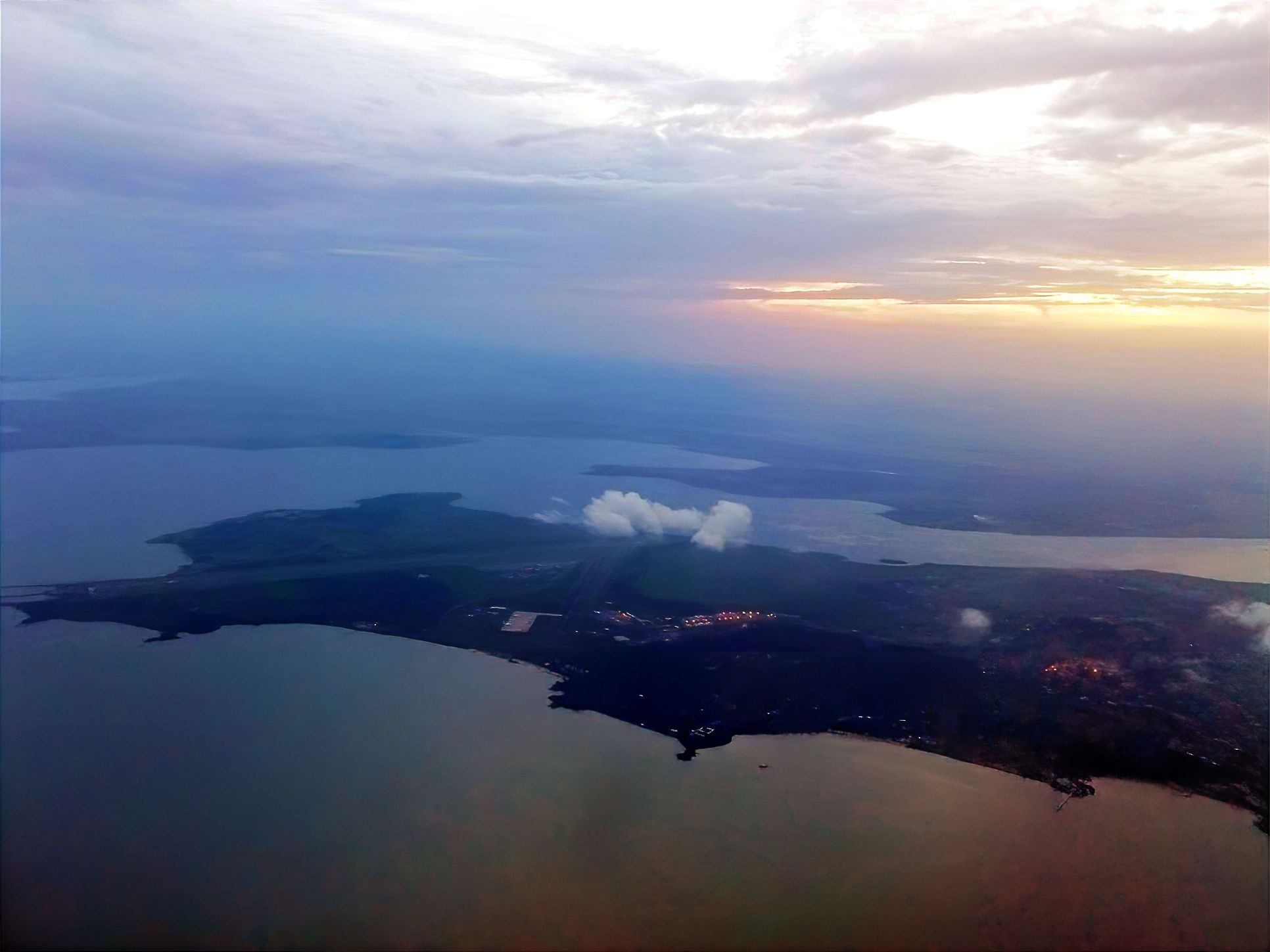
Sunset over Entebbe

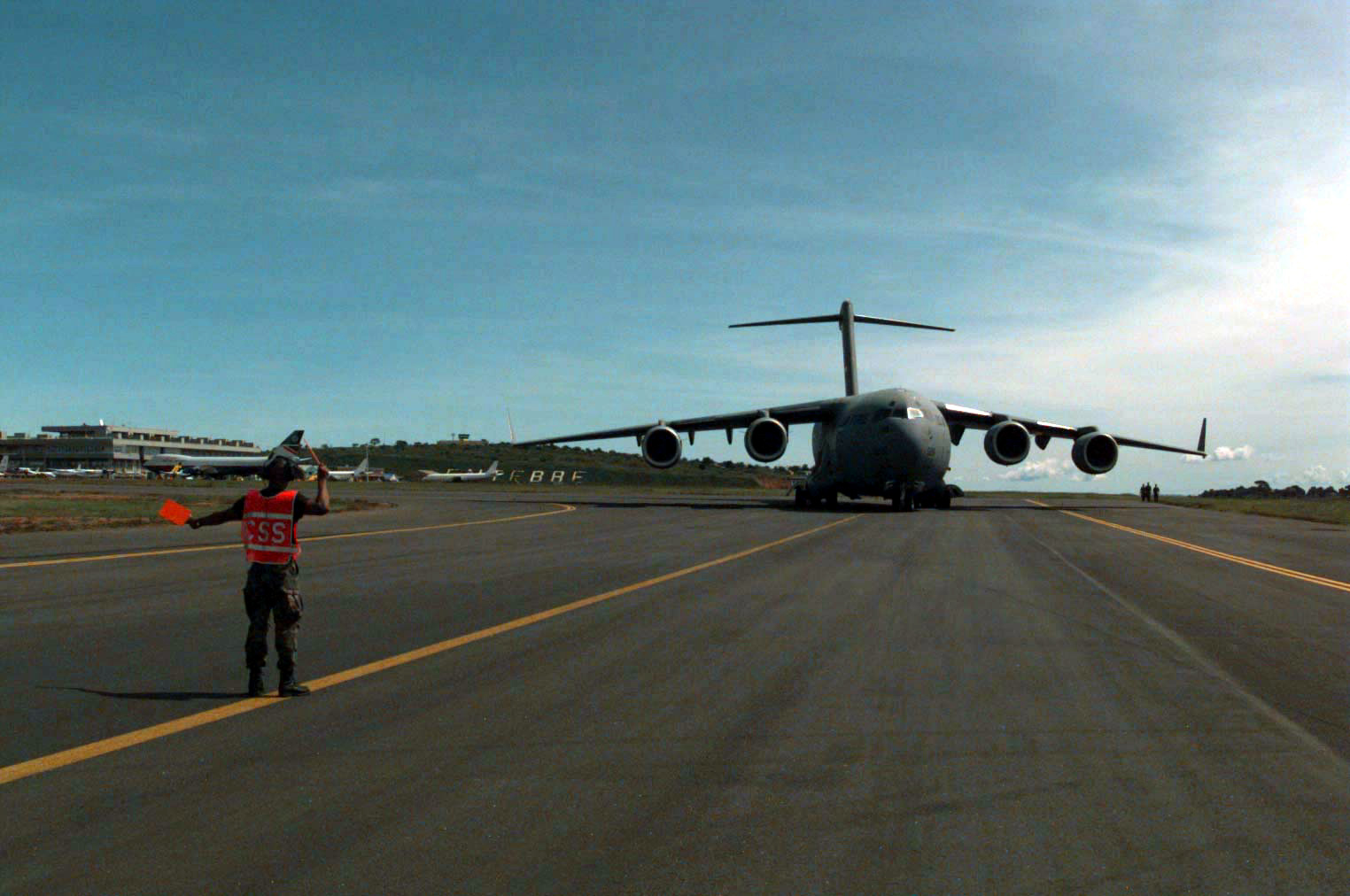
Entebbe International Airport

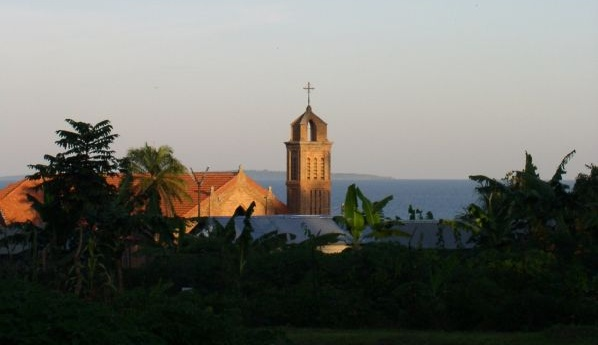
Bugonga Church in Entebbe

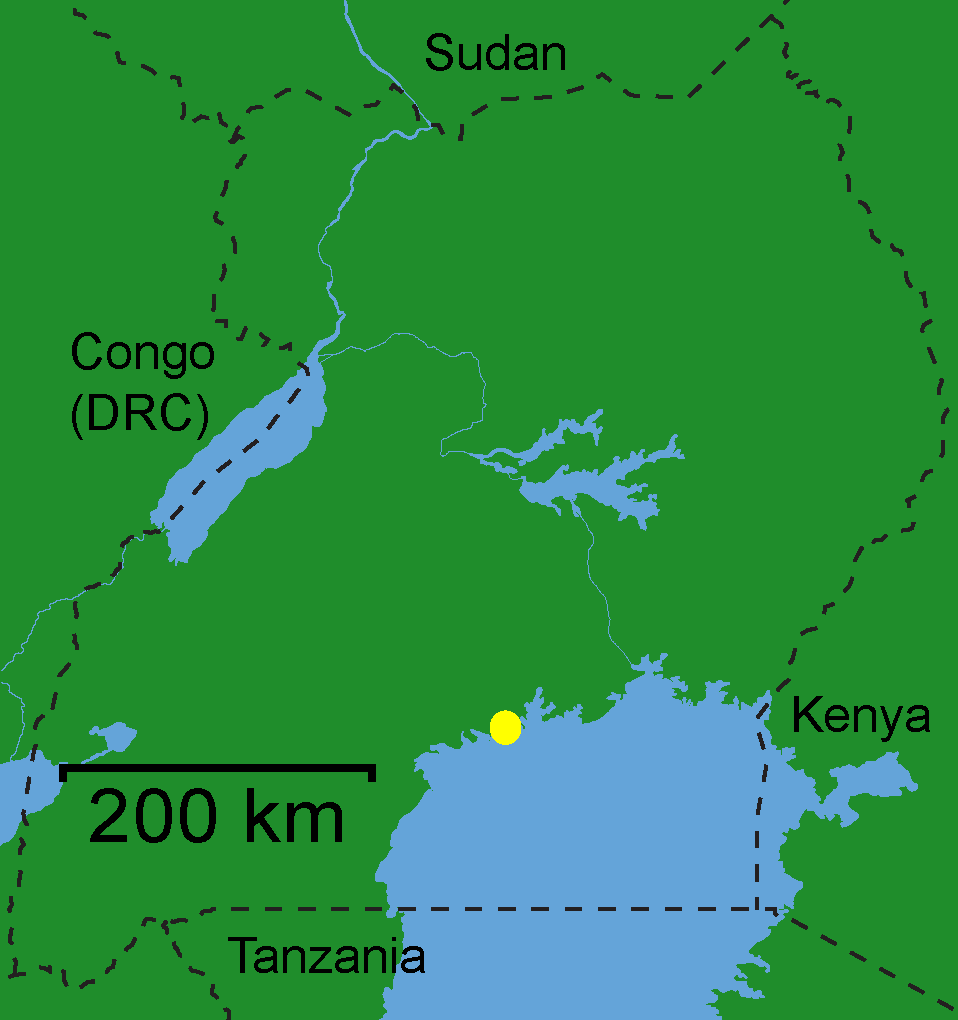
Entebbe sits on the northern shores of Lake Victoria

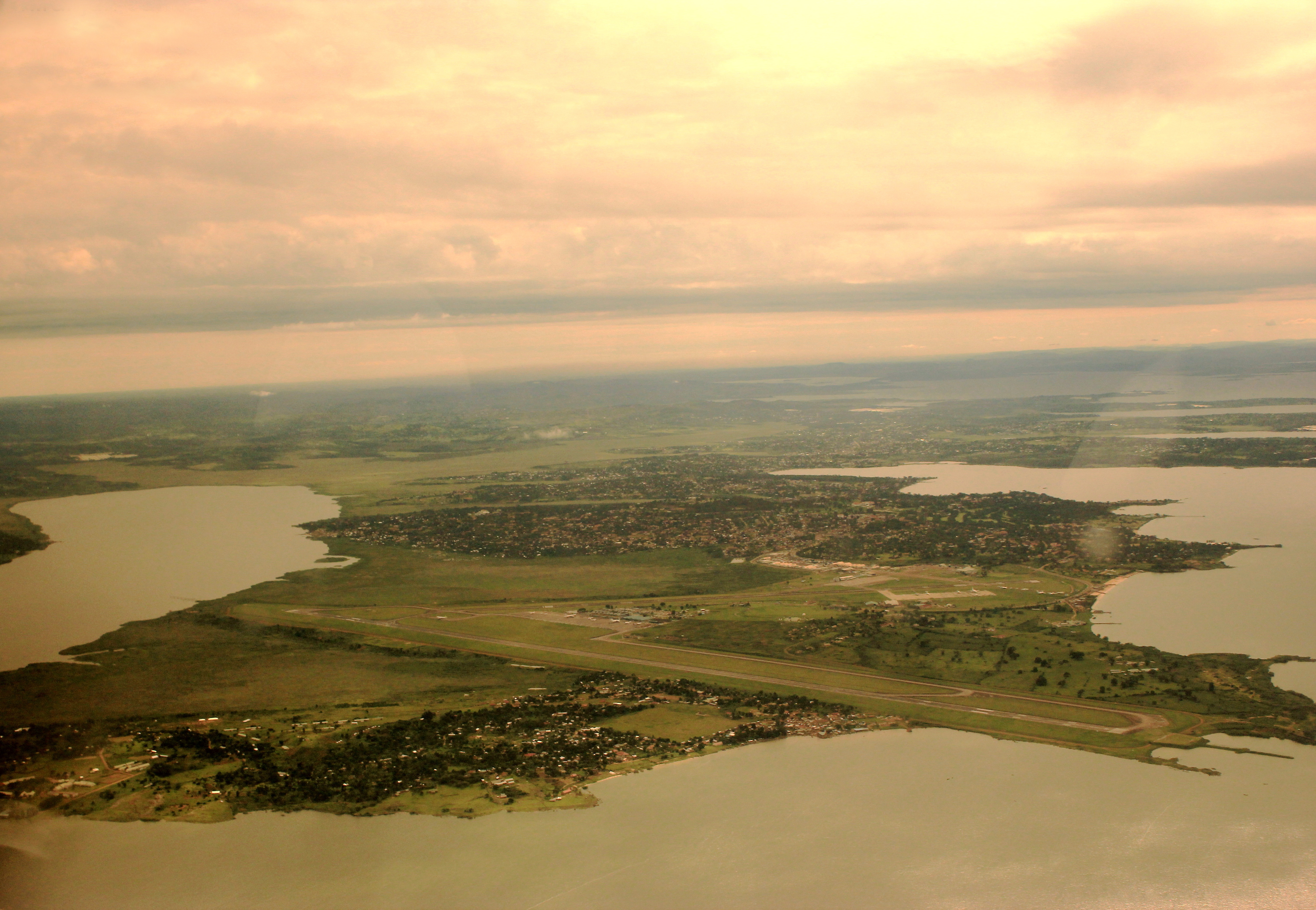
Entebbe along Lake Victoria

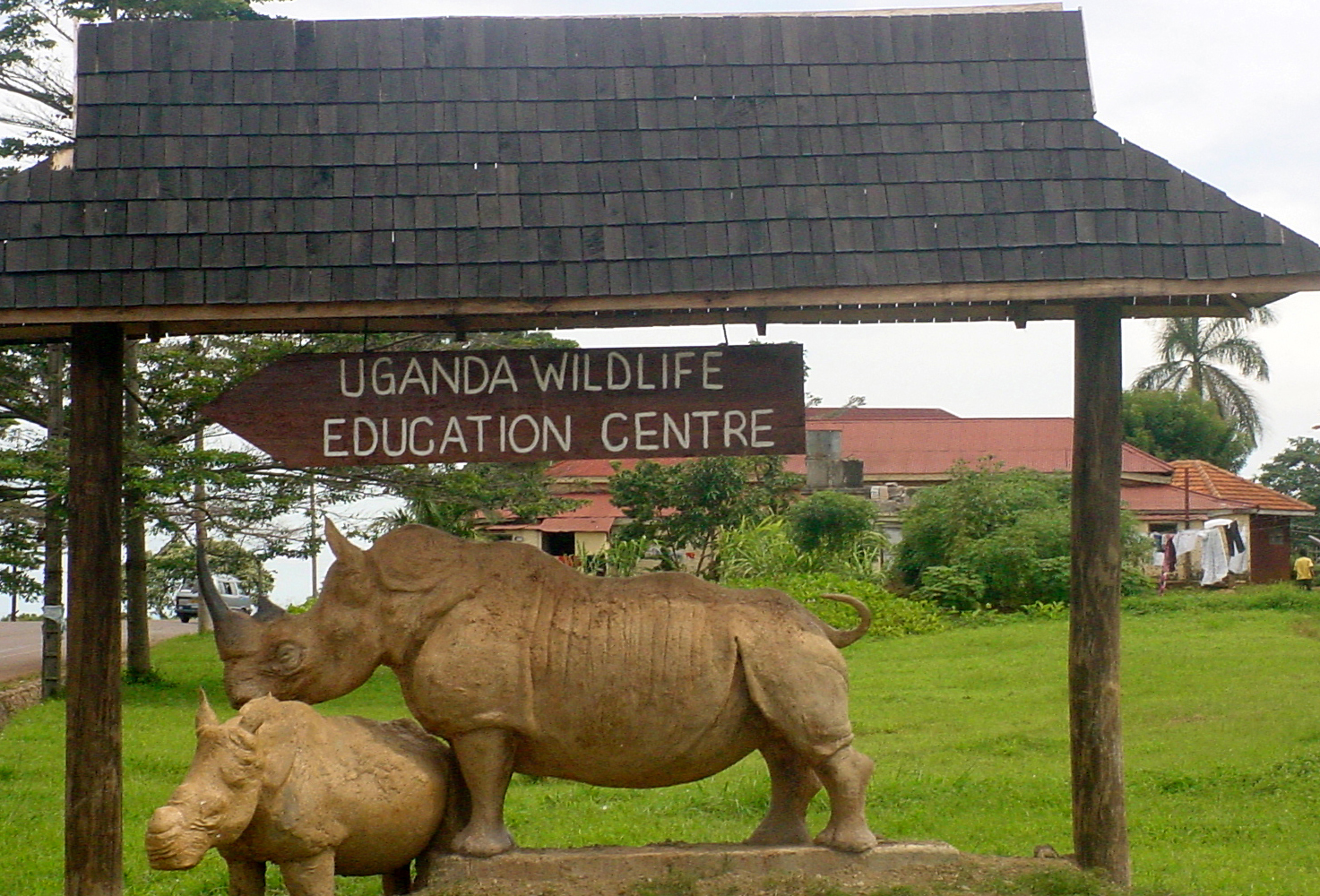
Wildlife Education Centre

== Government and infrastructure ==
The head office of the Ugandan Civil Aviation Authority is on the property of Entebbe International Airport. The Uganda Ministry of Agriculture, Animal Industry and Fisheries maintains its headquarters in Entebbe.

The Special Forces Command, a specialized unit of the Uganda People's Defense Forces, responsible for the security of the president of Uganda, his immediate family, constitutional monarchs, state guests and vital national assets, including the national oil fields, maintains its headquarters in Entebbe.

== Other points of interest ==
Other points of interest within the city limits or close to its edges include the offices of Entebbe City Council and several branches of foreign and indigenous commercial banks. The supermarket chain, Shoprite, maintains a branch in Entebbe.

Entebbe is home to the Entebbe Children's Surgical Hospital, a children's hospital, center of excellence for pediatric surgery, owned and operated by Emergency, an international NGO that offers "free medical treatment to the victims of war, poverty and landmines".

== Geography ==
=== Climate ===
Entebbe experiences a tropical rainforest climate (Af) according to the Köppen climate classification as the city has no real dry season throughout the year. Its driest month is July with precipitation averaging 72 millimetres or 2.83 inches, while the wettest is April with precipitation averaging 264 millimetres or 10.39 inches. The temperature is moderated by the altitude. The hottest month is February with an average temperature of 22.8 °C (73.0 °F), while the coolest is July with an average temperature of 20.6 °C (69.1 °F).

Climate data for Entebbe, Uganda (1961–1990)
Month	Jan	Feb	Mar	Apr	May	Jun	Jul	Aug	Sep	Oct	Nov	Dec	Year
Record high °C (°F)	31.3 (88.3)	31.7 (89.1)	30.6 (87.1)	30.0 (86.0)	28.9 (84.0)	27.8 (82.0)	28.1 (82.6)	28.9 (84.0)	29.8 (85.6)	29.6 (85.3)	31.7 (89.1)	29.5 (85.1)	31.7 (89.1)
Mean daily maximum °C (°F)	26.3 (79.3)	27.3 (81.1)	26.7 (80.1)	26.0 (78.8)	25.4 (77.7)	25.2 (77.4)	25.3 (77.5)	25.9 (78.6)	26.5 (79.7)	26.5 (79.7)	26.0 (78.8)	26.5 (79.7)	26.1 (79.0)
Mean daily minimum °C (°F)	18.0 (64.4)	18.3 (64.9)	18.5 (65.3)	18.4 (65.1)	18.0 (64.4)	17.8 (64.0)	17.2 (63.0)	17.4 (63.3)	17.4 (63.3)	17.7 (63.9)	17.9 (64.2)	17.8 (64.0)	17.9 (64.2)
Record low °C (°F)	13.0 (55.4)	10.7 (51.3)	14.4 (57.9)	12.2 (54.0)	14.3 (57.7)	14.0 (57.2)	10.0 (50.0)	12.0 (53.6)	13.2 (55.8)	13.9 (57.0)	14.3 (57.7)	13.8 (56.8)	10.0 (50.0)
Average rainfall mm (inches)	86.7 (3.41)	84.4 (3.32)	184.5 (7.26)	264.4 (10.41)	253.8 (9.99)	116.2 (4.57)	72.1 (2.84)	77.8 (3.06)	79.0 (3.11)	127.6 (5.02)	171.7 (6.76)	120.6 (4.75)	1,638.8 (64.52)
Average rainy days (≥ 1.0 mm)	7.3	7.3	13.1	16.8	16.2	9.4	6.9	6.3	7.1	10.7	13.6	10.2	124.9
Average relative humidity (%)	76	76	77	79	79	78	77	78	76	75	76	76	77
Mean monthly sunshine hours	234	204	205	181	191	187	197	194	194	205	202	214	2,408
Source 1: World Meteorological Organization
Source 2: Deutscher Wetterdienst (extremes and humidity), Danish Meteorological Institute (sun, 1931–1960)

== See also ==
- Entebbe Expressway
- Entebbe SS
- Wakiso District
- Central Uganda
- Mutundwe-Entebbe High Voltage Power Line
