= Kampala–Entebbe Road =

Road in Uganda

Coordinates: 00°11′48″N 32°32′23″E

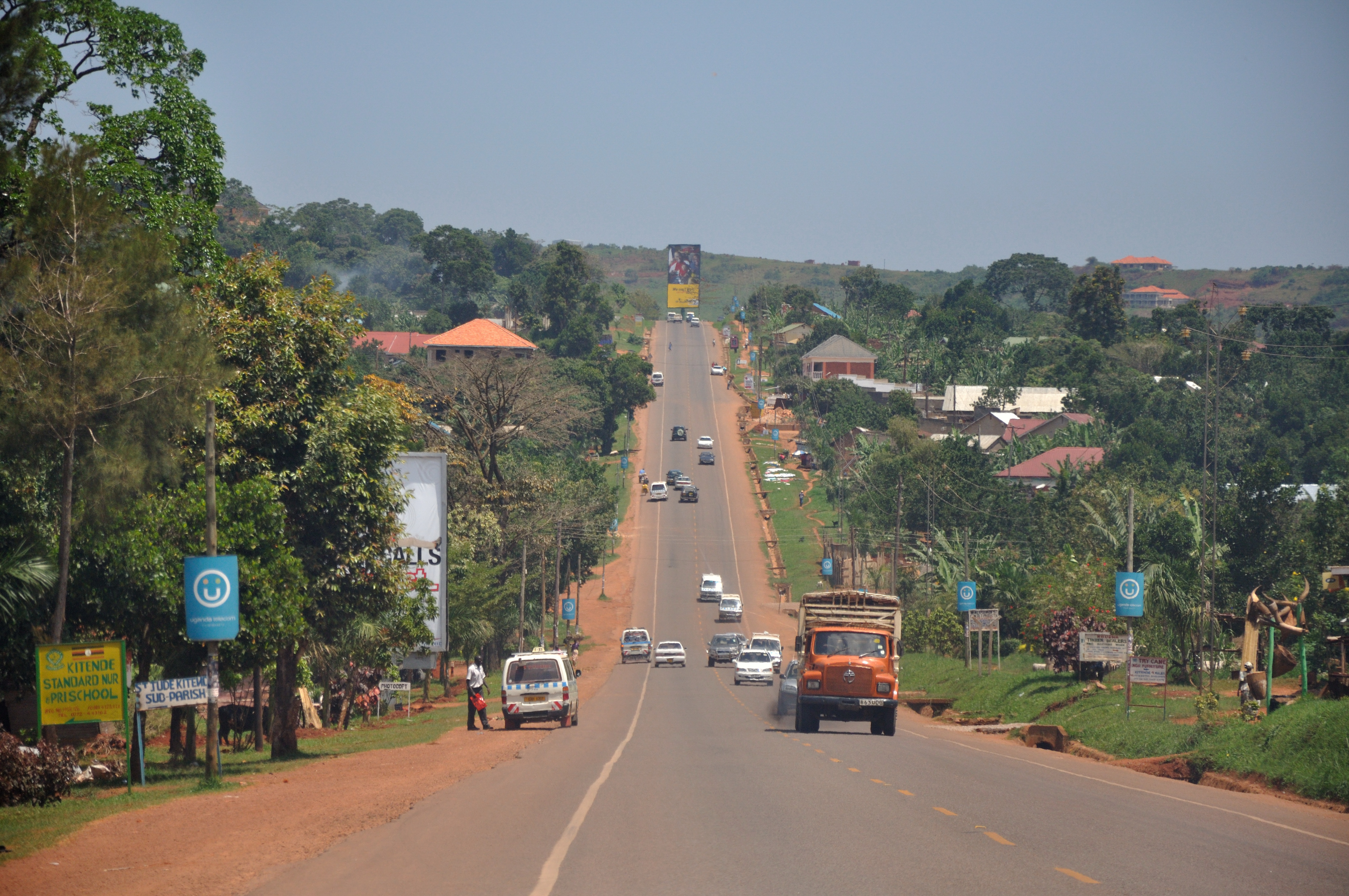

Route information
- Length: 25 mi (40 km)

Major junctions
- North end: Kampala
- Kibuye; Kajjansi; Abayita Ababiri
- South end: Entebbe International Airport

Location
- Country: Uganda

Highway system
- Roads in Uganda

The Kampala–Entebbe Road, also known as the Entebbe–Kampala Road or the Entebbe Road, is a road in the Central Region of Uganda, connecting the capital city of Kampala and Entebbe International Airport.

== Location ==
The road starts on Kampala Road, directly opposite the Kampala Road Branch of the Housing Finance Bank. It travels south through the Clock Tower neighborhood and on through Kibuye, Kajjansi, and Abayita Ababiri before ending at the airport, a distance of about 40 kilometres (25 mi).

== Overview ==
This road is a very busy transport corridor. It is the second-busiest road in the country, after Kampala-Jinja Road. Kampala–Entebbe Road accommodates an estimated 264,000 passengers every day, as of May 2016. Other credible sources quoted traffic on this road at 635,656 vehicles annually, in 2011.

Before the opening of the Entebbe–Kampala Expressway, this road was the only direct link between the city center and the international airport. The road is single carriageway, too narrow for the heavy traffic using the road. Because of the congestion, the road is one of the most automobile accident-prone locations in the country.

== Points of interest ==
The following points of interest also lie along or near the road:

- The headquarters and two factories of the Roofings Group are located at Lubowa, about 10 kilometres (6.2 mi), south of Kampala.
- Mildmay Health Centre is located approximately 16 kilometres (10 mi) south of Kampala.
- Kajjansi is a neighborhood, where several other points of interest are located and where the Munyonyo spur of Entebbe–Kampala Expressway crosses the Kampala–Entebbe Road.
- The campus of St. Mary's College Kisubi lies on Kampala–Entebbe Road, about 25 kilometres (16 mi) south of Kampala.
- State House Uganda, the official residence of the President of Uganda, lies in the town of Entebbe, about 36 kilometres (22 mi), south of Kampala.
- Entebbe International Airport, where the road ends.

== See also ==
- List of roads in Uganda
- Transport in Uganda
