= Kajjansi =

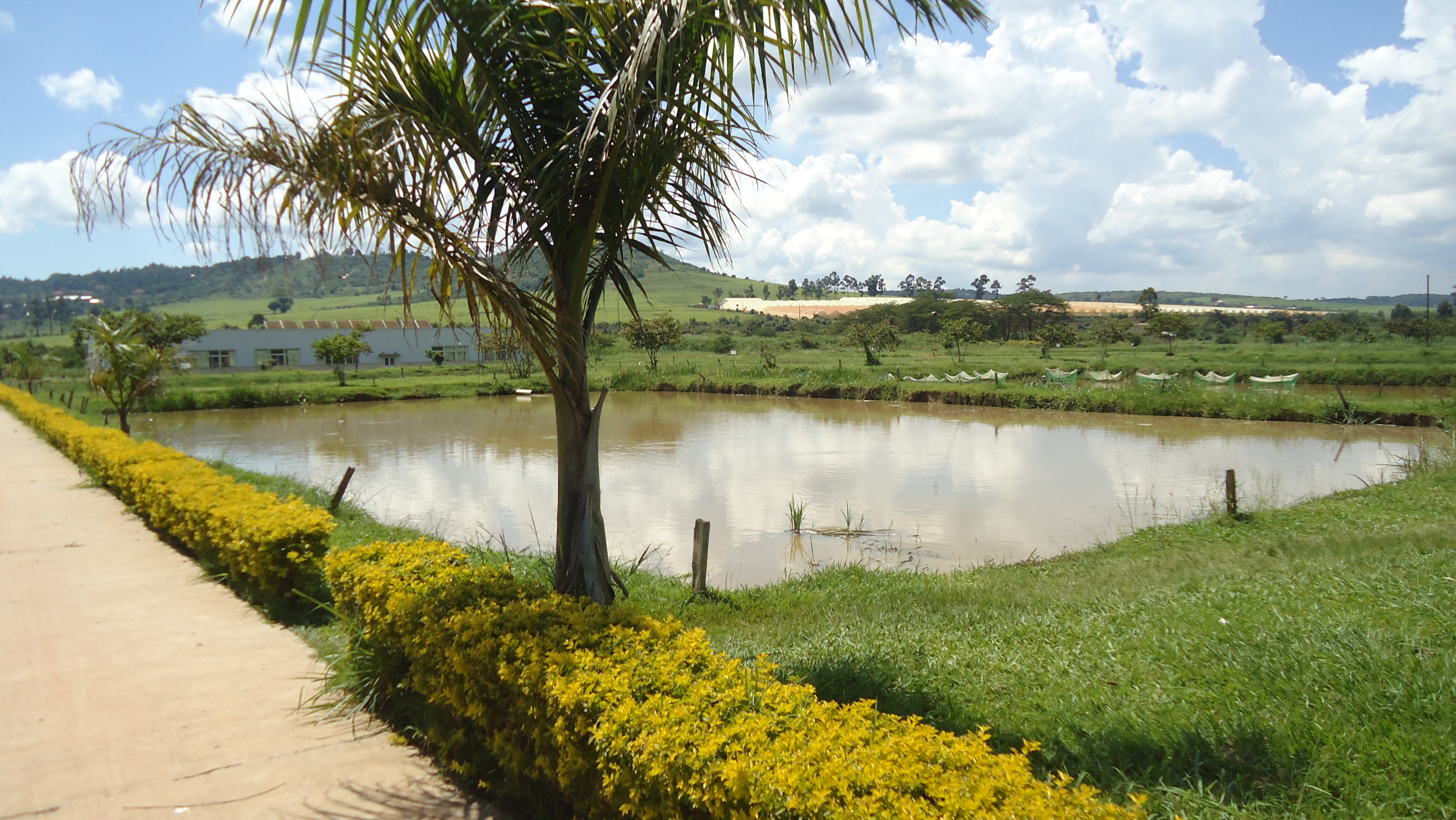
- Ponds at the Aquaculture Research and Development Centre, Kajjansi

- Map of Uganda showing the location of Kajjansi
- Coordinates: 00°12′54″N 32°33′00″E
- Country: Uganda
- Region: Central Uganda
- District: Wakiso District
- Elevation: 1,180 m (3,870 ft)

Population (2024 Census)
  - Total: 155,058
- Time zone: UTC+3 (EAT)

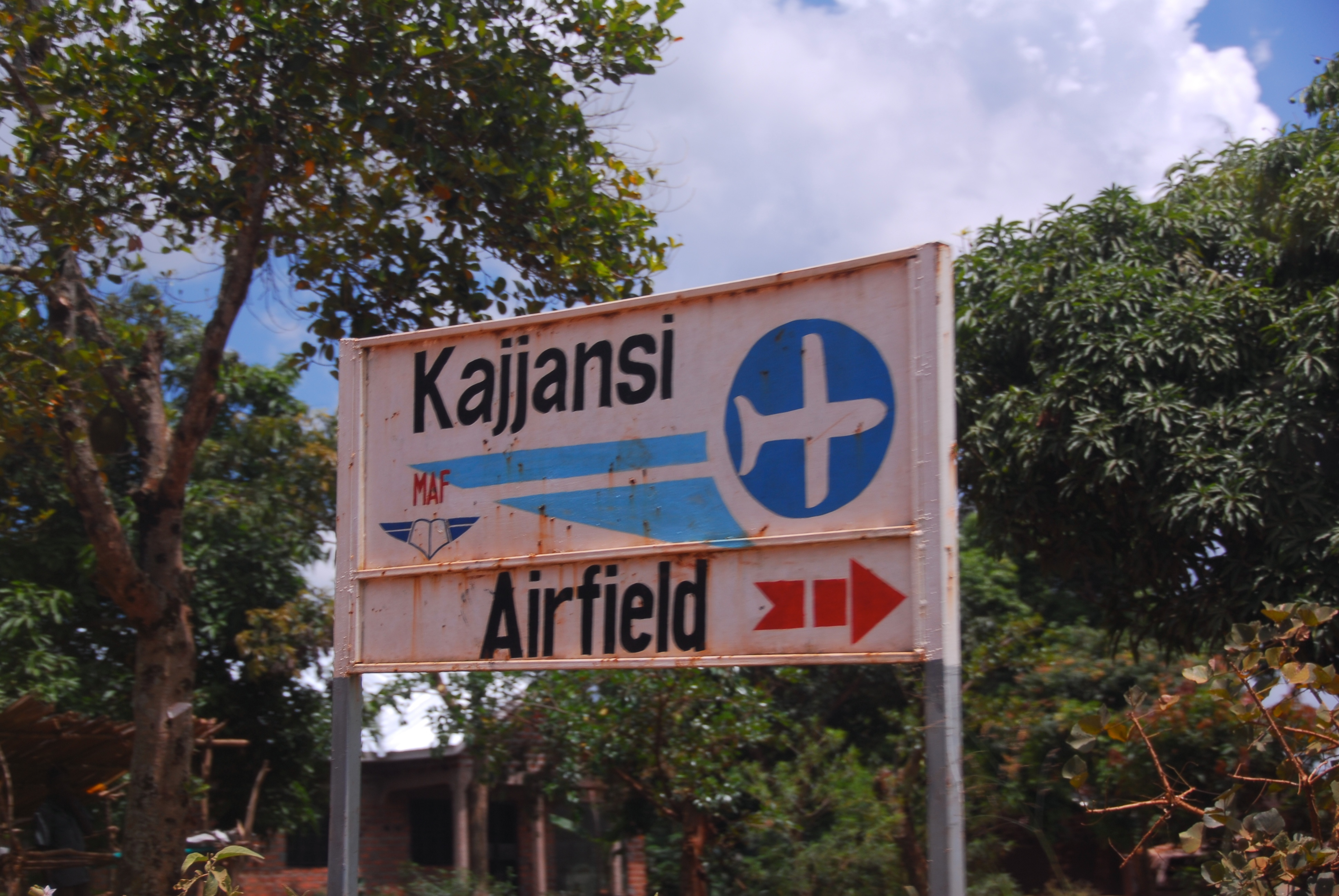
Kajjansi Airfield sign.

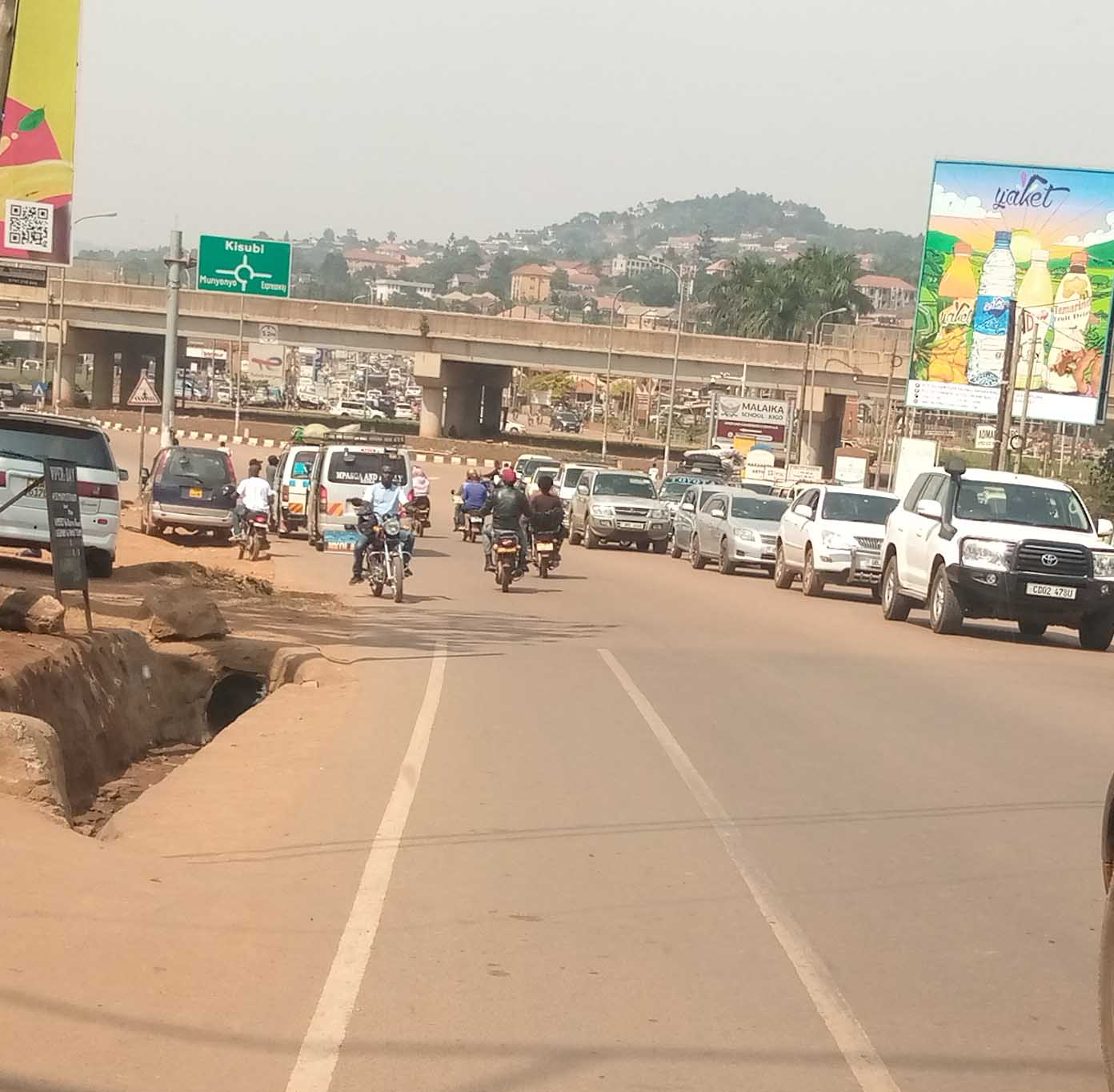
Kampala- Entebbe Express high way approaching Kajjansi from Lweza

Kajjansi is a town in Central Uganda. It is one of the urban centers in Wakiso District.

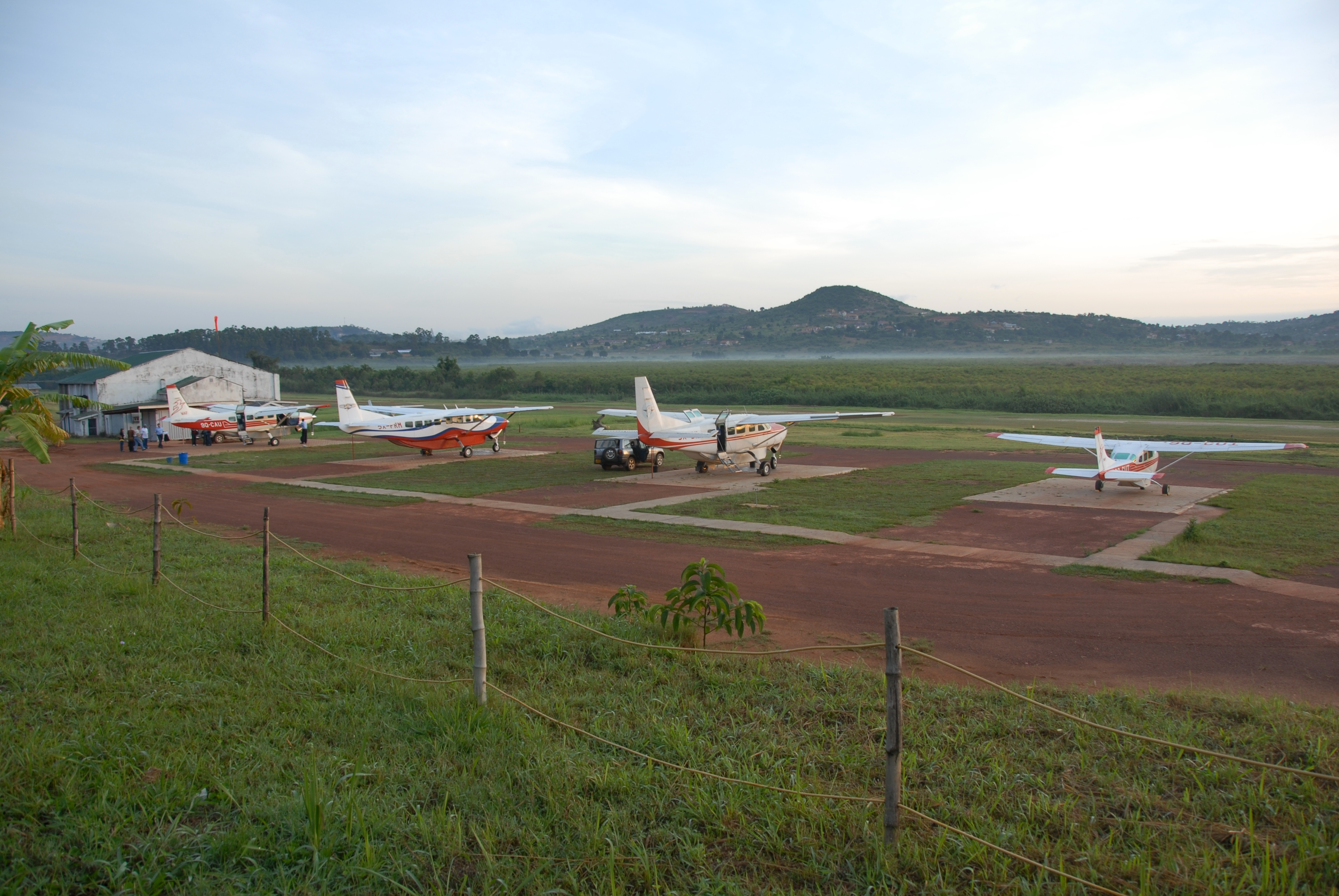
Kajjansi Airport

== Location ==
The township is situated on the tarmacked, all-weather Kampala - Entebbe Road. Kajjansi is located approximately 16 kilometres (9.9 mi), by road, south of Kampala, Uganda's capital and largest city. This location is approximately 25 kilometres (16 mi), by road, north of Entebbe International Airport, Uganda's largest civilian and military airport. The coordinates of Kajjansi are:0°12'54.0"N, 32°33'00.0"E (Latitude:0.2150; Longitude:32.5500).

== Population ==
In 2006, the population of Kajjansi was estimated at 7,530.

== Points of interest ==
The following points of interest lie within the town limits or close to the edges of town:

- Uganda Clays Limited - The headquarters and main factory are located in Kajjansi
- Kajjansi Airport - A private civilian airport belonging to Mission Aviation Fellowship
- A branch of Equity Bank
- Kajjansi Roses - A horticultural company; a member of the Madhvani Group of Companies
- Headquarters of the Rotary Club of Kajjansi, Uganda. Club Number:61815
- Aquaculture Research and Development Centre - A government fisheries research and training center
- Palliative Care Association of Uganda (PCAU)
- Sunfish Farms Limited - A private fish farm
- Kajjansi Central Market

== See also ==
- Kira Municipality
- Gombe
- Matugga
- Kakiri
- Nansana
- Wakiso
- Wakiso District
- Central Region, Uganda
