= List of companies of Uganda =

Location of Uganda

Uganda, officially the Republic of Uganda, is a landlocked country in East Africa. Uganda's economy generates income from annual exports that include coffee ($466.6 million), tea ($72.1 million), and fish ($136.2 million). The country has commenced economic reforms and growth has been robust. In 2008, Uganda recorded 7 percent growth despite the global downturn and regional instability.

Uganda has substantial natural resources, including fertile soils, regular rainfall, and sizable mineral deposits of copper and cobalt. The country has largely untapped reserves of both crude oil and natural gas. While agriculture accounted for 56 percent of the economy in 1986, with coffee as its main export, it has now been surpassed by the services sector, which accounted for 52 percent of GDP in 2007.

== Notable firms ==
This list includes notable companies with primary headquarters located in the country. The industry and sector follow the Industry Classification Benchmark taxonomy. Organizations which have ceased operations are included and noted as defunct.

Notable companies Status: P=Private, S=State; A=Active, D=Defunct
Name	Industry	Sector	Headquarters	Founded	Notes	Status	
ABC Bank (Uganda)	Financials	Banks	Kampala	1993	Commercial bank	P	A
Africell	Telecommunications	Mobile telecommunications	Kampala	2014		P	A
Aya Group	Conglomerates	-	Kampala	1999	Food and beverage, construction, hotels & resorts	P	A
Bank of Africa Uganda Limited	Financials	Banks	Kampala	1984	Commercial bank, part of Bank of Africa Group (Mali)	P	A
Bank of Baroda Uganda Limited	Financials	Banks	Kampala	1953	Commercial bank, part of Bank of Baroda (India)	P	A
Bank of India (Uganda)	Financials	Banks	Kampala	2012	Commercial bank, part of Bank of India (India)	P	A
Bank of Uganda	Financials	Banks	Kampala	1966	Central bank	S	A
Barclays Bank of Uganda	Financials	Banks	Kampala	1927	Commercial bank, part of Barclays (UK)	P	A
BRAC Uganda Bank Limited	Financials	Banks	Kampala	2006	Credit bank	P	A
Cairo International Bank	Financials	Banks	Kampala	1995	Commercial bank	P	A
Centenary Bank	Financials	Banks	Kampala	1983	Commercial bank	P	A
Citibank Uganda	Financials	Banks	Kampala	1999	Commercial bank, part of Citigroup (US)	P	A
Commercial Bank of Africa (Uganda)	Financials	Banks	Kampala	2014	Commercial bank, part of Commercial Bank of Africa (Kenya)	P	A
Crane Bank	Financials	Banks	Kampala	1995	Acquired by DFCU Bank	P	D
Dei BioPharma	Health care	Pharmaceuticals	Matugga	2014	Pharma	P	A
DFCU Bank	Financials	Banks	Kampala	1964	Commercial bank, part of DFCU Group	P	A
DFCU Group	Financials	Banks	Kampala	1964	Financial services holding company	P	A
Diamond Trust Bank (Uganda)	Financials	Banks	Kampala	1945	Commercial bank	P	A
Eagle Air (Uganda)	Consumer services	Airlines	Kampala	1994	Regional and charter airline	P	A
East African Development Bank	Financials	Banks	Kampala	1967	Development finance	P	A
Ecobank (Uganda)	Financials	Banks	Kampala	2009	Commercial bank, part of Ecobank (Togo)	P	A
Equity Bank (Uganda)	Financials	Banks	Kampala	2008	Commercial bank, part of Equity Group Holdings Limited (Kenya)	P	A
Exim Bank (Uganda)	Financials	Banks	Kampala	2011	Commercial bank, part of Exim Bank (Tanzania)	P	A
Finance Trust Bank	Financials	Banks	Kampala	1984	Commercial bank	P	A
FINCA Uganda Limited	Financials	Banks	Kampala	1992	Microfinance	P	A
Global Trust Bank	Financials	Banks	Kampala	2008	Commercial bank	P	A
Guaranty Trust Bank (Uganda)	Financials	Banks	Kampala	2008	Commercial bank, part of Guaranty Trust Bank (East Africa)	P	A
Housing Finance Bank	Financials	Banks	Kampala	1967	Commercial bank	P	A
Imperial Hotels Group	Consumer services	Hotels	Kampala	1991	Hotels	P	A
International Medical Group (Uganda)	Health care	Health care equipment & services	Kampala	1996	Private medical services	P	A
K2 Telecom	Telecommunications	Mobile telecommunications	Kampala	2013	Mobile network	P	A
Kakira Sugar Works	Consumer goods	Food products	Kakira	1930	Sugar	P	A
Kampala Hilton Hotel	Consumer services	Hotels	Kampala	2010	Hotel, part of Aya Group	P	A
Kampala Serena Hotel	Consumer services	Hotels	Kampala	2006	Hotel	P	A
Kampala Sheraton Hotel	Consumer services	Hotels	Kampala	1967	Hotel, part of Sheraton Hotels and Resorts (US)	P	A
Kampala Speke Hotel	Consumer services	Hotels	Kampala	1925	Hotel, part of Ruparelia Group	P	A
KCB Bank Uganda Limited	Financials	Banks	Kampala	2007	Part of KCB Group Limited (Kenya)	P	A
Kinyara Sugar Works Limited	Consumer goods	Food products	Masindi	1969	Sugar	P	A
Kyagalanyi Coffee Limited	Consumer goods	Food products	Kampala	1990	Coffee	P	A
National Bank of Commerce (Uganda)	Financials	Banks	Kampala	1991	Commercial bank	P	A
National Insurance Corporation	Financials	Full line insurance	Kampala	1964	Insurance	P	A
National Social Security Fund (Uganda)	Financials	Investment services	Kampala	1985	Retirement funds	S	A
National Water and Sewerage Corporation	Utilities	Water	Kampala	1972	Water and sanitation	S	A
NC Bank Uganda	Financials	Banks	Kampala	2012	Commercial bank	P	A
New Vision Group	Consumer services	Publishing	Kampala	1986	Newspaper, television	P	A
New Vision	Consumer services	Publishing	Kampala	1986	Newspaper, part of New Vision Group	P	A
Nile Bank Limited	Financials	Banks	Kampala	1988	Defunct 2007, merged into Barclays Bank of Uganda	P	D
Opportunity Uganda Limited	Financials	Banks	Kampala	1995	Credit institution	P	A
Orient Bank	Financials	Banks	Kampala	1993	Commercial bank	P	A
Posta Uganda	Industrials	Delivery services	Kampala	1951	Postal services	S	A
PostBank Uganda	Financials	Banks	Kampala	1926	Credit institution	P	A
Pride Microfinance Limited	Financials	Banks	Kampala	1995	Microfinance	P	A
Quality Chemical Industries Limited	Health care	Pharmaceuticals	Kampala	2005	Pharma	P	A
Royal Daisy Airlines	Consumer services	Airlines	Kampala	2005	Private airline, defunct	P	D
Ruparelia Group	Conglomerates	-	Kampala	1985	Banking, insurance, education, real estate, hotels	P	A
Sango Bay Estates Limited	Consumer goods	Food products	Kakuuto	1930	Sugar	P	A
Skyjet Airlines	Consumer services	Airlines	Kampala	2003	Airline	P	A
Stanbic Bank Uganda Limited	Financials	Banks	Kampala	1906	Commercial bank	P	A
Standard Chartered Uganda	Financials	Banks	Kampala	1912	Commercial bank	P	A
Statewide Insurance Company	Financials	Full line insurance	Kampala	1982	Insurance and risk management	P	A
Sugar Corporation of Uganda Limited	Consumer goods	Food products	Lugazi	1924	Sugar	P	A
Tropical Bank	Financials	Banks	Kampala	1973	Commercial bank	P	A
UGAFODE Microfinance Limited	Financials	Banks	Kampala	1994	Microfinance	P	A
Uganda Air Cargo	Industrials	Delivery services	Kampala	1994	Cargo	P	A
Uganda Broadcasting Corporation	Consumer services	Broadcasting & entertainment	Kampala	2005	Broadcaster	S	A
Uganda Cancer Institute	Health care	Biotechnology	Kampala	1967	Biotech	P	A
Uganda Commercial Bank	Financials	Banks	Kampala	1965	Commercial bank, defunct 2001	P	D
Uganda Development Bank Limited	Financials	Banks	Kampala	1972	State-owned, development bank	S	A
Uganda Electricity Generation Company Limited	Utilities	Conventional electricity	Kampala	2001	Power	S	A
Uganda National Oil Company	Oil & gas	Exploration & production	Kampala	-	Petroleum	S	A
Uganda Railways Corporation	Industrials	Railroads	Kampala	1977	State railway	S	A
Uganda Reinsurance Company	Financials	Full line insurance	Kampala	2000	Reinsurance	P	A
Uganda Securities Exchange	Financials	Investment services	Kampala	1997	Stock exchange	S	A
Uganda Telecommunications Corporation Limited	Telecommunications	Fixed line telecommunications	Kampala	2000	Telecom	P	A
Uganda Virus Research Institute	Health care	Biotechnology	Entebbe	1936	Biotech	P	A
Umeme	Utilities	Conventional electricity	Kampala	2004	Electrical utility	P	A
United Airlines Limited	Consumer services	Airlines	Kampala	1999	Airline	P	A
United Bank for Africa (Uganda)	Financials	Banks	Kampala	2008	Commercial bank	P	A

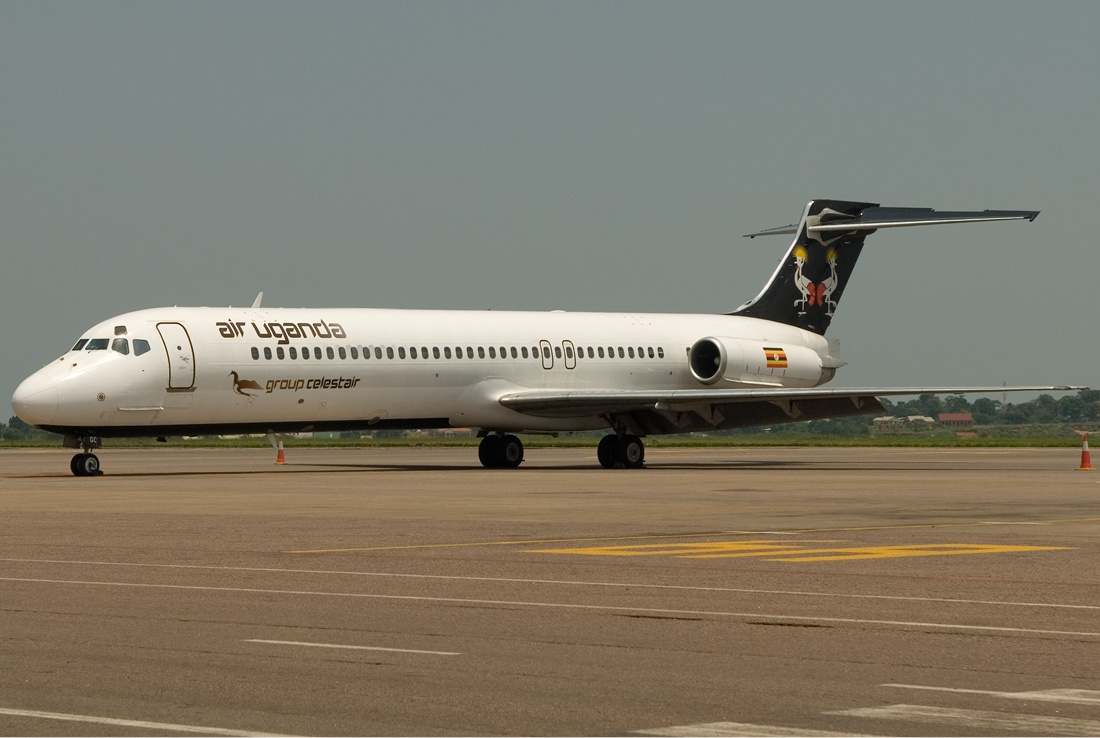
An Air Uganda McDonnell Douglas MD-87 at Entebbe International Airport

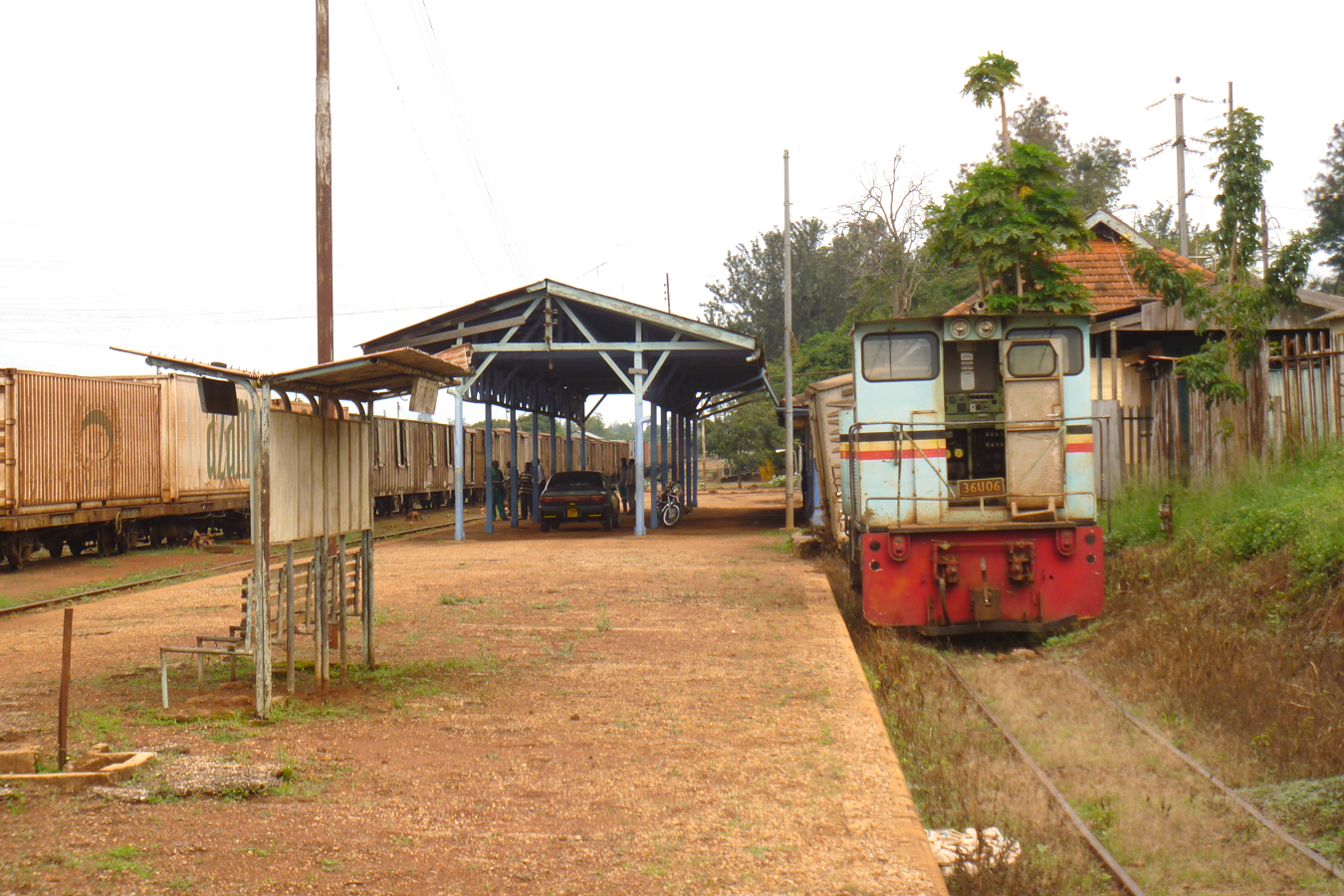
A Uganda Railways Corporation locomotive at the Tororo railway station

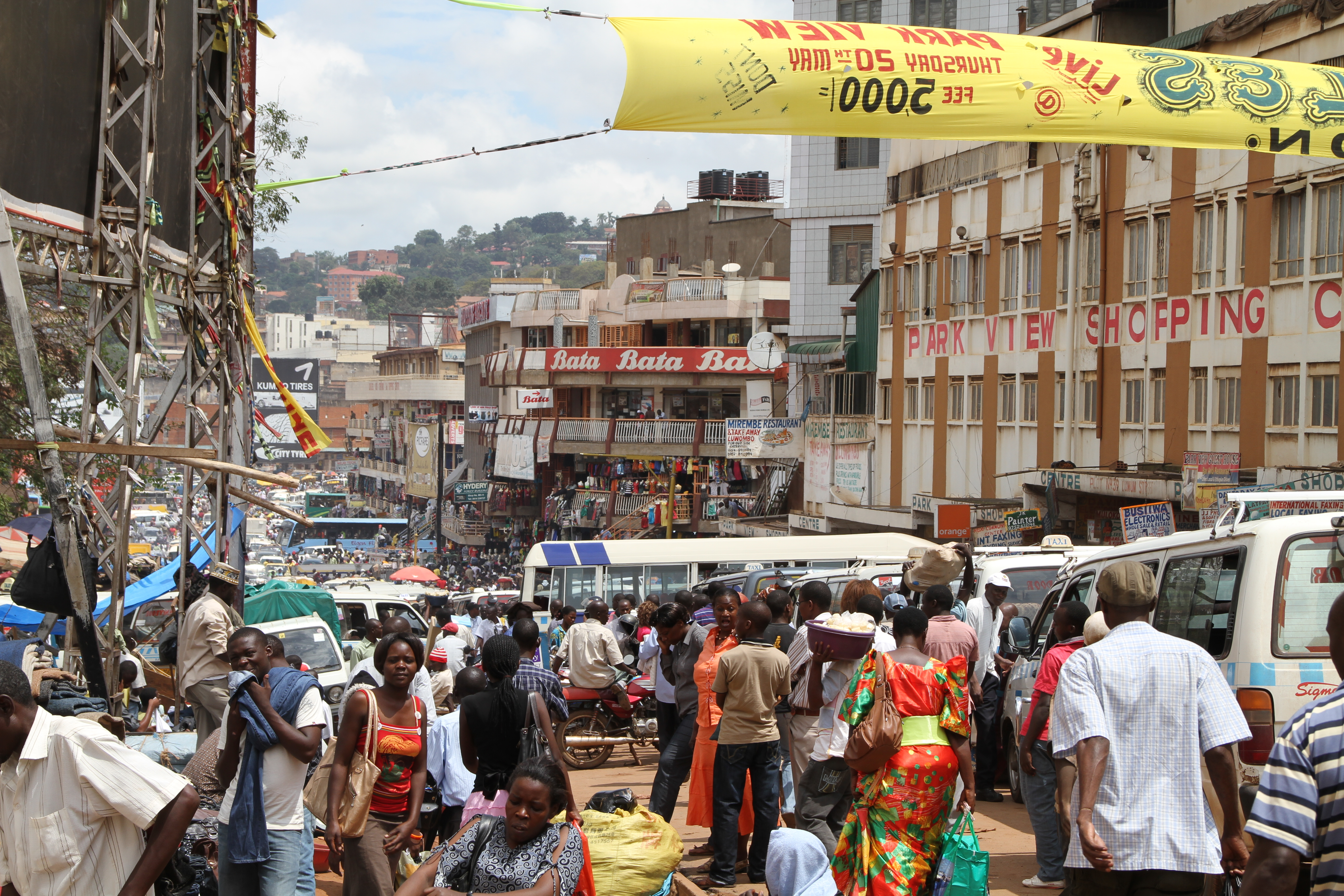
A street market in the capital, Kampala

== See also ==
- Banking in Uganda
- Economy of Uganda
- List of airlines of Uganda
- List of banks in Uganda
- List of defunct airlines of Uganda
- List of mobile network operators in Uganda
- List of satellite television service providers in Uganda
- List of sugar manufacturers in Uganda
- Uganda Investment Authority
- Category:Book publishing companies of Uganda
