= List of defunct airlines in Uganda =

This is a list of now defunct airlines from Uganda.

Airline	Image	IATA	ICAO	Callsign	Commenced operations	Ceased operations	Notes
Africa One (Uganda)		Y2	RDA;AFI	-	2002	2004	
Air Alexander				Planet Air	1999	2001	
Air Memphis (Uganda)			MHU	-	2003	2006	Renamed/merged to: Sky Jet Avn. Formed by Egypt's Air Memphis. Renamed in 2005 or 2006.
Air Uganda		U7	UGB	Uganda AC	1970	1970	
Air Uganda		U7	UGB	Meridiana Africa AL Uganda	2007	2014	
Alliance Air (Uganda)		Y2	AFJ	JAMBO	1995	1999	renamed/merged to: SA Alliance Air
Almiron Aviation			-	-	2004	2012	
Coastal Airways (Uganda)			-	-	1981	1983	renamed/merged to: Cobra AW
Cobra Airways			-	-	1983	1984	renamed/merged to: Cobra AW
DAS Air Cargo		WD	DSR	DAIRAIR	1974	2007	
East African Airlines		QU	UGX	EastAf	2002	2007	
Fly540 Uganda			FUL	-	2008	2011	
Great Lakes Airways			GLU	-	2001	2004	
Pearl Air Services			PBY	PEARL SERVICES	2006	2006	
Royal Daisy Airlines		6D	KDR	DARLINES	2005	2010	
SA Alliance Air		Y2	AFJ	DARLINES	1995	1999	
Shiv Air					????	????	
Sky Jet Aviation			MHU;SJU	-	2006	2006	
Skyjet Uganda			SJU;SJA	-	2008	2009	
Transafrik Uganda			TKU	-	2009	2011	
Triangle Airlines			TRU	-	1995	1997	
Uganda Airlines		QU	UGA	UGANDA	1977	2001	
Victoria International Airlines		VB	WEV	-	2006	2007	

== See also ==
- List of airlines of Uganda
- List of airports in Uganda
