= List of defunct airlines of Uganda =

This is a list of defunct airlines of Uganda.

| Airline | Image | IATA | ICAO | Callsign | Commenced operations | Ceased operations | Notes |
|---|---|---|---|---|---|---|---|
| Air Uganda | | U7 | UGB | | 2007 | 2014 | Scheduled carrier |
| Air Memphis | | | MHU | | | | Passenger charter |
| Africa One | | Y2 | CFR; AFI | | 2002 | 2004 | Passenger charter |
| Alliance Air | | Y2 | AFJ | JAMBO | 1994 | 2000 | Ran at a loss, last flight October 8, 2000. Joint venture between South African Airways, Tanzania and Uganda. |
| Coastal Airways | | | | | | | Passenger charter |
| DAS Air Cargo | | WD | DSR | AIRAIR | 1983 | 2007 | Continental Aviation Services (Nigeria) Ltd. bought all of the business and assets. |
| Fly540 Uganda | | | FUL | | | | Scheduled carrier |
| East African Airlines | | QU | UGX | ZEBRA | 2002 | 2007 | |
| East African Airways | | EC | EC | EastAf | 1946 | 1977 | Jointly run by Kenya, Tanzania, and Uganda |
| Pearl Air Services | | | PBY | PEARL SERVICES | | | |
| Uganda Airlines (1976–2001) | | QU | UGA | UGANDA | 1976 | 2001 | Scheduled carrier |
| United Airlines Uganda | | | | | | Scheduled carrier | |
| Victoria International Airlines | | | VIA | | 2007 | 2007 | Scheduled carrier |
| Vule Airways | | | | | 2017 | 2017 | Startup aborted |

== See also ==
- List of airlines of Uganda
- List of airports in Uganda
- List of companies based in Uganda
