= United Airlines Uganda =

Airline in Uganda

United Airlines Limited
IATA	ICAO	Call sign
—	UAU	—
- Founded: 1997
- Operating bases: Entebbe International Airport
- Focus cities: Kampala, Entebbe
- Destinations: 7 (at time it went out of service)
- Headquarters: Kampala, Uganda
- Website: Homepage

United Airlines Limited, also known as United Airlines Uganda, was a private airline based in Uganda that provided scheduled passenger services and air charter operations from its hub at Entebbe International Airport. The airline operated domestic routes within Uganda and served as an important regional carrier before ceasing operations. United Airlines Limited was distinct from the current national flag carrier Uganda Airlines, which began operations in 2019 as a revival of the original state-owned Uganda Airlines that operated from 1977 to 2001.

The airline's operations were centered around connecting various airports within Uganda, facilitating both passenger transportation and charter services for the domestic market. As a private carrier, United Airlines Limited filled an important niche in Uganda's aviation sector during a period when the country's national airline was not operational. The company's base at Entebbe International Airport, Uganda's primary international gateway, provided strategic access to both domestic and regional routes.

United Airlines Limited's cessation of operations was part of broader changes in Uganda's aviation industry, which saw the eventual establishment of the current Uganda Airlines in 2019 under government ownership. The airline industry in Uganda has historically faced challenges related to financial sustainability and regulatory compliance, factors that affected multiple carriers including United Airlines Limited.

== Destinations ==
The airline maintained scheduled and shuttle services to the following destinations:

Country	City	Airport	Notes	Refs
Uganda	Adjumani	Adjumani Airport	Scheduled	
Uganda	Arua	Arua Airport	Scheduled	
Uganda	Entebbe/Kampala	Entebbe International Airport	Hub	
Uganda	Gulu	Gulu Airport	Scheduled	
Uganda	Moyo	Moyo Airport	Scheduled	
Uganda	Nebbi	Nebbi Airport	Scheduled	
Uganda	Pakuba	Pakuba Airport	Scheduled	

== See also ==
- List of airlines of Uganda
- Entebbe International Airport
