= Africa One =

Africa One may refer to:

- AfricaOne (Uganda), a regional airline based in Uganda
- Africa One (Congo Kinshasa), a regional airline based in the Democratic Republic of the Congo

== See also ==
- 2007 Africa One Antonov An-26 crash
