= Royal Daisy Airlines =

IATA	ICAO	Call sign
6D	KDR	DARLINES
- Founded: 2005
- Hubs: Entebbe International Airport
- Focus cities: Juba, Kisumu
- Fleet size: 1
- Destinations: 2
- Parent company: DAS Air Cargo
- Headquarters: Kampala, Uganda
- Key people: Daisy Roy; Managing Director & Chief Executive Officer
- Website: none

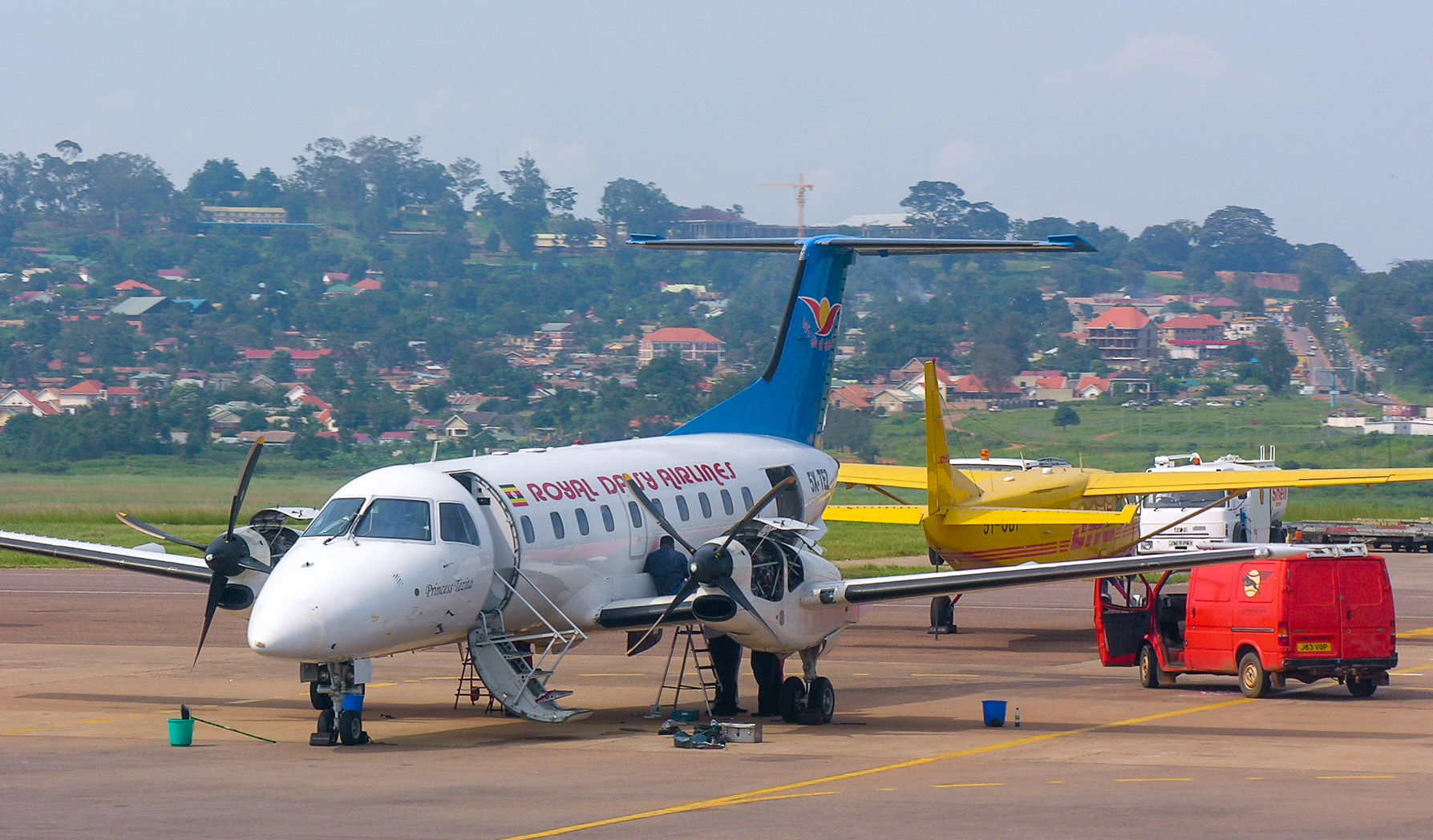

Royal Daisy Airlines (IATA: 6D, ICAO: KDR), was a private airline in Uganda. The airline is no longer in business.

== Location ==
The airline maintains its headquarters in Kampala, the capital of Uganda and the largest city in that country. The airline's major operations base is at Entebbe International Airport, the largest civilian and military airport in Uganda.

== Overview ==
Royal Daisy operates regular scheduled flights from Entebbe, Uganda to Juba, South Sudan. The company operates a 30-seater twin engine Embraer 120 aircraft. One of three Uganda-based airlines to fly the route between Entebbe and Juba, Royal Daisy's business increased when Sudan Airways withdrew from the route in 2005. It was their success on the route between Juba and Entebbe, where they compete with Air Uganda and Eagle Air (Uganda), that led to the opening of the Kisumu route in May 2008. African Safari Airways operates a Royal Daisy charter on the route between Entebbe and Nairobi, Kenya.

== History ==
The airline was formed on 30 November 2005.

== Destinations ==
Royal Daisy Airlines flies from Entebbe to Juba, South Sudan. The airline also flies between Entebbe and Kisumu, Kenya.

== Fleet ==
As of December 2012, Royal Daisy Airlines operates the following aircraft

- 1 Embraer 120 30 seater aircraft

== See also ==
- Airlines of Uganda
- List of defunct airlines of Uganda
- List of airports in Uganda
