= Matthias Magoola =

Ugandan chemist and entrepreneur (born 1978)

- Born: November 1978 (age 47); Uganda
- Education: Makerere University, European International University, Paris
- Occupations: Chemist, entrepreneur, inventor
- Known for: Founder and Managing Director of Dei BioPharma

Dr. Matthias Magoola (born 1978) is a Ugandan chemist, entrepreneur and inventor. He is the founder of Dei BioPharma, one of Africa's largest biotechnology and pharmaceutical companies. His work focuses on developing innovative treatments for diseases such as cancer, malaria, HIV/AIDS, and diabetes, with a particular emphasis on mRNA technology.

== Early life and education ==
Magoola was born in Uganda in 1978 and obtained a Bachelor of Science in Industrial Chemistry from Makerere University in Kampala. In early 2024, he was awarded a Doctorate of Philosophy (PhD) from the European International University in Paris, France.

== Career ==
In 2006, Magoola established the Dei Group, a conglomerate encompassing various sectors. Under his leadership, the group expanded to include Dei BioPharma Ltd, founded in 2014, which spearheads pharmaceutical manufacturing in Uganda.

=== Dei BioPharma Ltd ===
Dei BioPharma operates a state-of-the-art facility in Matugga, Wakiso District, Uganda, covering 150 acres. The facility is equipped to produce a range of pharmaceutical products, including vaccines, insulin, oncology drugs, and mRNA therapies, with a capacity of up to one billion doses of MRNA vaccines annually.

In October 2022, Ugandan President Yoweri Museveni officially commissioned the $500 million Dei BioPharma vaccines facility. During the inauguration, President Museveni lauded Dr. Magoola's vision and commitment to advancing Uganda's pharmaceutical industry, emphasizing the facility's potential to enhance the country's capacity to produce essential medicines and vaccines locally.

=== Innovations and patents ===
Magoola has secured multiple U.S. patents for his work in biotechnology. Notably, on February 6, 2025, he was granted a patent for a novel cancer treatment utilizing guided mRNA technology. This innovation represents a significant advancement in targeted cancer therapy, employing a composition of guided mRNA attached to the Cas9 protein to specifically target and disrupt mutated genes responsible for cancer, thereby preventing their repair and leading to the destruction of cancerous cells. This method targets only the mutated cancer cells, leaving healthy cells untouched, offering the potential to treat all types of cancer regardless of stage, while avoiding the debilitating side effects associated with traditional treatments such as chemotherapy, antibody therapy, and radiation.

Additionally, he holds patents for treatments addressing malaria, neurodegenerative disorders, diabetes, HIV, and HPV, including a universal mRNA-based malaria vaccine. One of Magoola’s groundbreaking inventions is the "mRNA-based vaccine composition for inducing immune response against HIV and HPV,” patented under certificate number 63921929 in the USA.

== Publications ==
Magoola has co-authored several publications. His latest study, “Advancing Therapeutic and Vaccine Proteins: Switching from Recombinant to Ribosomal Delivery—A Humanitarian Cause,” has been featured in the International Journal of Molecular Sciences. Additionally, his co-authored works include “Advances in Escherichia Coli-Based Therapeutic Protein Expression: Mammalian Conversion, Continuous Manufacturing, and Cell-Free Production,” and “mRNA and Synthesis-Based Therapeutic Proteins: A Non-Recombinant Affordable Option,” both published in the Biologics journal.

== Recognition ==
Magoola's contributions have garnered international acclaim:

- In December 2024, he received the Best Researcher Award at the International Molecular Biologist Awards for his pioneering work in mRNA vaccine research.
- In April 2025, he was honored with the Pharma Ratna Universe Award in India, recognizing his visionary approach to pharmaceutical innovation.
- Later that month, he received the African Excellence & Personality Award in Ghana, highlighting his impact on healthcare advancements in Africa.
- On February 24, 2024, Magoola was honored with the 10th International Excellence and Global Leadership Award by Fame Times International Excellence Awards in Bangkok, Thailand, for his visionary success and groundbreaking discoveries in advanced therapies.

In April 2025, Ugandan President Yoweri Museveni commended Magoola for securing a U.S. patent for cancer treatment, acknowledging it as a milestone for Uganda's scientific progress. During a meeting at State House Entebbe, the President pledged full government support to Dei BioPharma's mission of making Ugandan-made vaccines and therapies globally recognized.
