= MAF Uganda =

Ugandan airline

Coordinates: 00°11′45″N 32°33′09″E

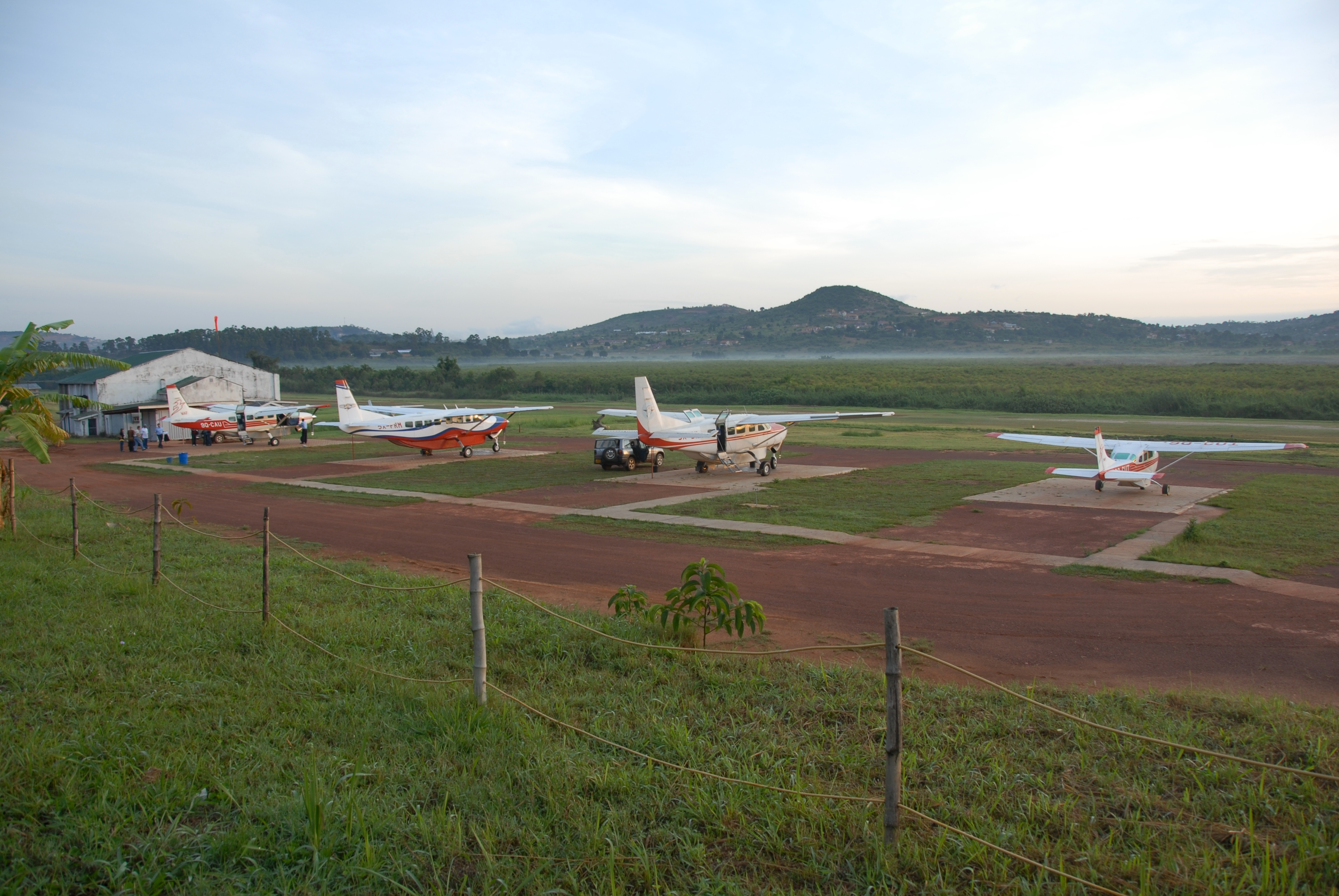
- MAF Uganda at Kajjansi Airfield
- Founded: 1987; 39 years ago
- Operating bases: Kajjansi Airfield
- Focus cities: Kampala, Entebbe
- Fleet size: 5
- Destinations: Multiple
- Parent company: Mission Aviation Fellowship (MAF)
- Headquarters: Kajjansi Airfield
- Website: Homepage

MAF Uganda, whose complete name is Mission Aviation Fellowship Uganda, is a humanitarian airline in Uganda, licensed by the Uganda Civil Aviation Authority with an air operator's certificate. The company is a Christian organization that provides aviation, communications, and learning technology services to Christian and humanitarian agencies, as well as isolated missionaries and indigenous villagers in the region of the African Great Lakes.

== Location ==
The headquarters of MAF Uganda are located at Gate 2, Kajjansi Airfield, in the town of Kajjansi, in Wakiso District, in the Central Region of Uganda. The geographical coordinates of the airline's headquarters are: 0°11'45.0"N, 32°33'09.0"E (Latitude:0.195833; Longitude:32.552500).

== Overview ==
MAF Uganda is a subsidiary and member of the international Christian charity, Mission Aviation Fellowship, based in Ashford, United Kingdom, present in over 30 countries around the world and with more than 130 aircraft in service. In Uganda, MAF operates five aircraft from its base and office at Kajjansi Airfield, to destinations in the Northern Region of Uganda, the eastern parts of the Democratic Republic of the Congo and South Sudan.

== Destinations ==
From its hub in Kajjansi, the company operates passenger charter services to destinations within Eastern Africa. Following is a partial list of destinations that MAF Uganda serves, as of May 2019.

Country	City	Airport	Notes	Refs
Uganda	Kajjansi	Kajjansi Airfield	Hub	
Uganda	Arua	Arua Airport	—	
Uganda	Kisoro	Kisoro Airport	—	
Uganda	Soroti	Soroti Airport	—	
Uganda	Entebbe	Entebbe International Airport	—	
Democratic Republic of the Congo	Beni	Beni Airport	—	
Democratic Republic of the Congo	Bunia	Bunia Airport	—	
Democratic Republic of the Congo	Bukavu	Bukavu Airport	—	
Democratic Republic of the Congo	Goma	Goma Airport	—	
Democratic Republic of the Congo	Kisangani	Bangoka International Airport	—	
South Sudan	Juba	Juba International Airport	—	
South Sudan	Maridi	Maridi Airport	—	
South Sudan	Yambio	Yambio Airport	—	

== Fleet ==
As of May 2019, MAF Uganda maintained the following aircraft in service.

MAF Uganda fleet
Aircraft	In fleet	Order	Passengers	Notes
Cessna 208 Caravan	4	0	10	
Cessna 206	1	0	4	
Total	5	0		

== See also ==
- Airlines of Africa
- List of airlines of Uganda
