= Uganda Airlines (1976–2001) =

National airline of Uganda (1976–2001)

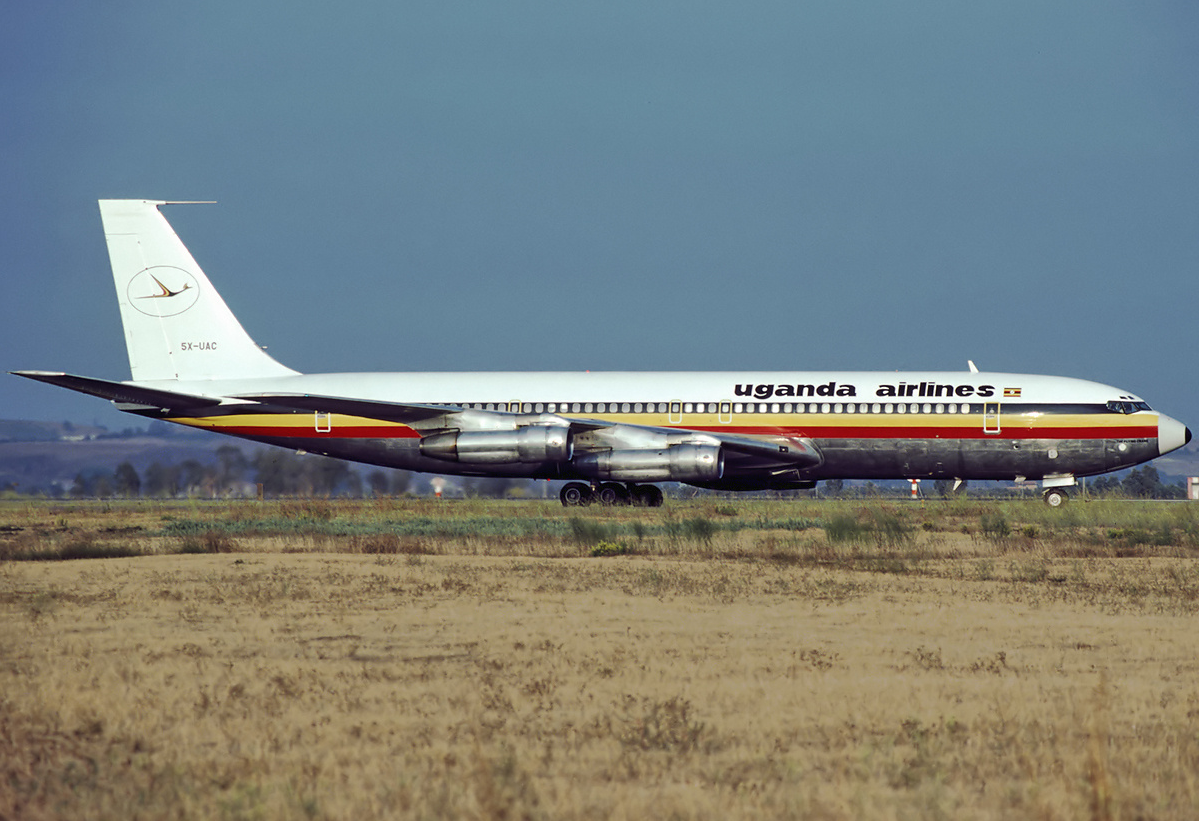
- A Uganda Airlines Boeing 707-351C
IATA	ICAO	Call sign
QU	UGA	UGANDA
- Founded: May 1976
- Commenced operations: 1977
- Ceased operations: May 2001
- Hubs: Entebbe International Airport
- Parent company: Government of Uganda
- Headquarters: Entebbe, Wakiso District, Uganda

Uganda Airlines, legally Uganda Airlines Corporation, was the flag carrier of Uganda. The airline was established in May 1976, and started operations in 1977. It was headquartered in Entebbe, Wakiso District, Uganda, and operated from its hub in Entebbe International Airport.

Attempts were made by the Government of Uganda to privatise the company, but all potential bidders pulled out, eventually leading to the liquidation of Uganda Airlines Corporation in May 2001. The airline was later revived and began flying again in 2019 under the same name, Uganda Airlines.

== History ==
Uganda Airlines L-100-30 Hercules at Stansted in 1987

Uganda Airlines was founded as a subsidiary of the government-owned Uganda Development Corporation (UDC) in May 1976 as a replacement of the services previously operated by East African Airways. It commenced operations in 1977, when Uganda Aviation Services (UAS), set up by British United Airways in 1965 but then a UDC subsidiary, was absorbed by Uganda Airlines, taking over the UAS route network. Following delivery of the first Boeing 707-320C in the late 1970s, new routes to Brussels, London and Rome were inaugurated. A second Boeing 707-320C entered the fleet in 1981. That year, new routes to Cairo, Cologne and Dubai were launched, followed by Dar es Salaam, Kilimanjaro and Nairobi in subsequent years.

By March 1990 the fleet included one Boeing 707-320C, two Fokker F27-600s, one Lockheed L-100-30, one Twin Otter and one B-N Trislander. A Boeing 737 was leased from Air Zimbabwe in 1994 to serve Bujumbura and Kigali, as well as destinations in South Africa. Tel Aviv was added to the route network in 1995, and by 1998 all European routes were discontinued.

Upon the creation of Alliance Air in late 1994—later known as SA Alliance—an entity jointly owned by the Tanzanian and Ugandan governments, Air Tanzania and Uganda Airlines, as well as by South African Airways (SAA), Tanzania and Uganda granted the rights of long-haul operations to the new airline. The agreement intended to feed Alliance Air's operations with both Air Tanzania and Uganda Airlines domestic and regional services. However, both regional carriers grew less than expected, and the deficit Uganda Airlines accumulated led the Ugandan Government to make a decision on whether to liquidate the airline or privatise it.

=== Privatisation attempt and collapse ===
In the late 1990s, the airline was in a delicate cash position owing to mismanagement, when the Government of Uganda planned to privatise the debt-ridden airline, seeking for an investor to keep the company afloat. Initially, several firms held an interest in taking over Uganda Airlines. SA Alliance/SAA, Air Mauritius, British Airways, Johannesburg-based Inter Air, Kenya Airways, and Sabena, all seemed to be interested bidders at the beginning, but eventually declined to submit bids, except for SAA that remained the only bidder by early 1999. SAA would have had a 49% participation in the company; nevertheless, it later dropped its bid after encountering strong legislature opposition. Having no offers, the Ugandan Government liquidated the airline in May 2001.

== Destinations ==
From its hub in Entebbe International Airport, in its heyday the company used to operate scheduled services to destinations within Africa, Europe and Middle East. Following is a list of destinations Uganda Airlines served all through its history:

Country	City	Airport	Notes	Refs
Belgium	Brussels	Brussels Airport		
Burundi	Bujumbura	Bujumbura International Airport		
Democratic Republic of the Congo	Goma	Goma International Airport		
Democratic Republic of the Congo	Kinshasa	N'djili Airport		
Germany	Cologne	Cologne Bonn Airport		
Israel	Tel Aviv	Ben Gurion Airport		
Italy	Rome	Rome Fiumicino Airport		
Kenya	Mombasa	Moi International Airport		
Kenya	Nairobi	Jomo Kenyatta International Airport		
Rwanda	Kigali	Kigali International Airport		
South Africa	Johannesburg	O. R. Tambo International Airport		
Tanzania	Dar-es-Salaam	Julius Nyerere International Airport		
Tanzania	Kilimanjaro	Kilimanjaro International Airport		
Tanzania	Mwanza	Mwanza Airport		
Uganda	Arua	Arua Airport		
Uganda	Entebbe/Kampala	Entebbe International Airport	Hub	
Uganda	Gulu	Gulu Airport		
Uganda	Kasese	Kasese Airport		
Uganda	Mbarara	Mbarara Airport		
Uganda	Soroti	Soroti Airport		
Uganda	Tororo	Tororo Airport		
United Arab Emirates	Dubai	Dubai International Airport		
United Kingdom	London	Gatwick Airport		
United Kingdom	London	Stansted Airport		
Zambia	Lusaka	Lusaka International Airport		
Zimbabwe	Harare	Harare International Airport		

=== Codeshare agreements ===
Following is a list of companies Uganda Airlines had codeshare agreements with at the time of closure; routes were actually operated by Uganda Airlines:

- Air Tanzania, Dar-es-Salaam and Johannesburg to/from Entebbe
- Emirates, Dubai to/from Entebbe
- Kenya Airways, Nairobi to/from Entebbe

== Fleet ==
This Uganda Airlines Boeing 707 (5X-UAL) was destroyed at Entebbe in 1979

- Britten-Norman Trislander
- Twin Otter
- Boeing 707-320C
- Boeing 707-338C
- Boeing 707-351C
- Boeing 727
- Boeing 737-200
- Boeing 737-500
- Cessna 402B
- Cessna U206
- Piper PA-28 Cherokee 235
- Piper PA-32 Cherokee Six
- Fokker F27-600
- King Air 100
- Lockheed L-100-30

== Accidents and incidents ==
According to Aviation Safety Network, the airline experienced three accidents/incidents throughout its history; only one of them yielded fatalities. Hull-losses are listed below.

- 1 April 1979: A Boeing 707-320C, aircraft registration 5X-UAL, that was standing at Entebbe International Airport, was destroyed by forces of the Tanzanian Army during the Uganda–Tanzania War. No fatalities were reported.
- 17 October 1988: Uganda Airlines Flight 775 was an international scheduled London Gatwick – Rome Fiumicino – Entebbe passenger service that crashed because of poor visibility on the final stage of its first leg, during the approach phase to Fiumicino Airport. The flight was operated with a Boeing 707-338C, aircraft registration 5X-UBC. The aircraft broke up after hitting the roof of a building, and burst into flames. Out of 52 occupants aboard, there were 33 fatalities, while many survivors were seriously injured.

== See also ==
- Transport in Uganda

== Sources ==
- Guttery, Ben R. (1998). Encyclopedia of African Airlines. Jefferson, NC: McFarland & Company. ISBN 0-7864-0495-7.
