= Flight 775 =

Flight 775 may refer to the following incidents involving commercial airliners:

- BOAC Flight 775, which was part of the Dawson's Field hijackings on 6 September 1970
- Iran Aseman Airlines Flight 775, a non-fatal runway-miss that occurred on 18 July 2000
- Uganda Airlines Flight 775, which crashed while attempting to land at Rome, Italy on 17 October 1988
