= Esther Mbabazi =

Rwandan airline pilot (born 1988)

- Born: 1988 (age 37–38); Burundi
- Citizenship: Rwanda
- Education: East African Civil Aviation Academy (private pilot's license); AeroStar (FAA airline transport pilot's license)
- Occupation: Commercial pilot
- Years active: 2012–present
- Known for: Aviation
- Title: Airline pilot, RwandAir

Esther Mbabazi is a professional commercial airline pilot in Rwanda. She is the first female in Rwanda to become certified as a commercial airline pilot. She flies for RwandAir, the national airline of Rwanda.

== Background and education ==
Mbabazi was born in Burundi circa 1988, to Rwandese parents. Her father and mother are revivalist pastors, and the family moved around a lot. When she was about eight years, her father died in a plane crash when the aircraft he was travelling in overshot the runway while landing in neighboring Democratic Republic of the Congo. The family moved back to Rwanda in 1996. Mbabazi trained at the East African Civil Aviation Academy in Uganda, before RwandAir sponsored her to continue her training in Miami, Florida.

== Career ==
On completion of her studies in the United States, Mbabazi was hired by RwandAir to fly as a co-pilot on the Boeing 737 and on the CRJ900, beginning in 2012, when she was 24 years old. In September 2024, she was inducted into the Captain's Club of the International Society of Women Airline Pilots (ISA+21). At that time she was certified as flight captain on the B737 aircraft class, and was a first officer on the CRJ900 and on the A330 aircraft classes.
