= Air Serv Limited =

Ugandan aviation company

Coordinates: 00°02′44″N 32°27′19″E

- Company type: Private
- Industry: Aviation
- Founded: 1995; 31 years ago
- Headquarters: Hangar One, Entebbe Old Airport, Entebbe, Uganda
- Key people: Stuart Willcuts; CEO
- Products: Air transport (passenger & cargo), Aircraft maintenance and repairs, Consulting
- Website: Homepage

Air Serv Limited also Air Serv Uganda Limited, is a Ugandan based aviation company, which offers air charter services to the countries of the African Great Lakes, aircraft maintenance and repairs, as well as humanitarian cargo deliveries in the region. Air Serv Limited is the for-profit subsidiary of the non-profit organisation Air Serv International.

== Location ==
Air Serv Limited maintains headquarters at Hangar One, Entebbe Old Airport, in the town of Entebbe, Wakiso District, in the Central Region of Uganda. The geographical coordinates of the company headquarters are 0°02'44.0"N 32°27'19.0"E (Latitude:0.045556; Longitude:32.455278).

== Overview ==
Over the last 25 years since its formation, Air Serv Limited has grown into a respectable air charter operator in Eastern Africa, with one of the region’s best aviation safety records. The company operates a fleet of five Cessna 208 Caravans, each with a seating capacity for twelve passengers. The company is involved in humanitarian assistance programs in the region of the African Great Lakes.

Air Serv Limited was established in 1995 to serve as a logistics and maintenance base for its American-based non-profit aviation owner, Air Serv International. Transporting aid workers, medicine, and other lifesaving cargo, Air Serv Limited offers a safe and affordable alternative to precarious land travel to and from remote locations.

== Destinations ==
From its hub in Entebbe Old Airport, the company operates humanitarian deliveries to destinations within Eastern Africa. Following is a partial list of destinations Air Serv Uganda Limited serves.

Country	City	Airport	Notes	Refs
Democratic Republic of the Congo	Beni	Beni Airport	—	
Democratic Republic of the Congo	Bunia	Bunia Airport	—	
Democratic Republic of the Congo	Bukavu	Kavumu Airport	—	
Democratic Republic of the Congo	Lubumbashi	Lubumbashi International Airport	—	
Uganda	Entebbe/Kampala	Entebbe International Airport	Hub	
Sudan	Khartoum	Khartoum International Airport	—	
South Sudan	Juba	Juba International Airport	—	
South Sudan	Wau	Wau Airport	—	

== Flight simulator ==
In August 2022, Air Serv Limited installed a Cessna Caravan flight simulator (Redbird CRV-S model), at its premises at Entebbe Airport, to complement its pilot training program. The service is also available for rent on an hourly basis, to other flight schools and private civilian pilots.

== See also ==
- Vanita Kayiwa
- List of airlines of Uganda
