= Vule Airways =

Ugandan airline

Coordinates: 00°18′37″N 32°36′00″E

IATA	ICAO	Call sign
n/a	n/a	n/a
- Founded: 2017
- Ceased operations: 2017
- Operating bases: Entebbe International Airport
- Headquarters: 515 Mbogo Road; Kibuli, Kampala, Uganda

Vule Airways Limited (IATA: n/a, ICAO: n/a) was a privately owned airline in Uganda. Established in March 2017, it was expected to begin scheduled commercial flights in November 2017.

== Operations ==
The company's corporate headquarters were at 515 Mbogo Road, Kibuli Hill, Kampala, Uganda. The airline maintained a sales office in the central business district of Kampala, at 13-15 Kimathi Avenue, and another office in southwest London, in the United Kingdom.

As of August 2017, the company was waiting for the award of an air operator's certificate by the Uganda Civil Aviation Authority (UCAA). The company planned to hire 60 employees initially and lease six aircraft to provide domestic, regional and international passenger and cargo services.

In August 2017, Ch-aviation reported that Vule Airways had secured an air services licence (ASL) from the Ugandan Civil Aviation Authority.

== Ownership ==
The company's shares were owned by Ugandans (55 percent) and non-Ugandans (45 percent).

== See also ==
- List of airlines of Uganda
