= Air Serv International =

- Founded: 1984; Florida, United States
- Subsidiaries: Air Serv Limited
- Fleet size: See Equipment below
- Headquarters: Warrenton, Virginia, United States
- Website: http://www.airserv.org/main.cfm?action=workingWithUs

Air Serv International is a nonprofit humanitarian organization that uses aircraft to fly relief workers and supplies to help victims of disasters in some of the most remote and challenging areas in the world. It flies where other air carriers cannot, or will not, fly. It is headquartered in Warrenton, Virginia, United States.

== Organization ==
Air Serv was founded in 1984 in the state of Florida as a humanitarian 501 (c) 3 Charitable Organisation. In 1997 it set up a subsidiary for-profit company in Uganda, Air Serv Limited. In 2007 it also maintains offices in Afghanistan, Canada, Chad, Democratic Republic of the Congo, France, Jordan and Mozambique. Air Serv is affiliated with various charity umbrella organizations, including Independent Charities of America, InterAction and Do Unto Others.

Air Serv was active in Banda Aceh in the wake of the 2004 Tsunami and late in 2005 was involved in relief work following the Kashmir earthquake in Pakistan.

== Equipment ==
Air Serv uses a variety of turboprop and piston engined aircraft as well as some leased or chartered helicopters and larger aircraft when required. As of November 2007 the fleet numbers 19 and includes:

- 1 Beechcraft 200 Super King Air
- 1 Beechcraft 1900C
- 6 Cessna 208B Grand Caravan
- 2 De Havilland Canada DHC-6 Twin Otter

== Accidents and incidents ==
Accident 31 August 2007. A Twin Otter being ferried back from Punia (PUN) (Democratic Republic of Congo) to Goma (GOM) in VMC. It was involved in an accident some 8-10 minutes after departure. The airplane crash-landed in the Oku River between Punia and Tchamaka. The airplane came to rest inverted in the water and was badly damaged. The aircraft was leased from Solenta Aviation and operated by Air Serv International

An Air Serv leased nineteen passenger Beechcraft 1900C crashed on 1 September 2008 in the Democratic Republic of the Congo, about 15 km northwest of Bukavu carrying two crew and fifteen passengers. The aircraft, registration ZS-OLD, was wet leased and flown by crew from South Africa's CEM Air. Based at Lanseria Airport, Johannesburg South Africa, it was arriving at Bukavu following technical service at N'Dolo Airport, Kinshasa. The aircraft was under the command of 24-year-old Rudi Knoetze of Johannesburg when it crashed into a mountainous ridge. Passengers included twelve Congolese, one French, one Indian, and one Canadian. Everyone was killed.

Accident 4 March 2009. An Air Serv Cessna Caravan registration 5X-ASI had to perform a forced landing shortly after takeoff from Maridi, Sudan, when it suffered engine failure. The airplane landed back on the runway before eventually coming to a stop off the end of the landing strip. The wing struck a tree during the forced landing. The wing reportedly came off as a result. [(Aviation Safety Network)]

== Operations ==
According to the authors of The Power of Unreasonable People Air Serv has provided more than 150,000 flights enabling hundreds of humanitarian relief organizations access to parts of the world under stress. Of these flights Air Serv has delivered more than 1,600 metric tons of supplies and served more than 230,000 passengers and patients. The environment that Air Serv operates in is often war torn countries, ravaged by fighting and unrest between rebel forces and governments. One pilot working with Air Serv recounted how she was held at gunpoint by a local needing transportation until the police aided her in resolving the issue. Another pilot that formerly flew with the Air Force remarked how he was shot at more than when he flew with the military. Sometimes fighting stops only for the planes to come in and deliver supplies and then the fighting will resume. On one flight the pilot of Air Serv was given 30 min by the rebel forces fighting in that region to land, refuel and evacuate fellow humanitarians and be back up in the air. Other factors that Air Serv pilots must deal with is inadequate runways and severe weather conditions. Landing in mud so deep that the plane becomes stuck requiring locals to dig out with machetes and rain that is so severe that it removes paint from the aircraft are just a few of the weather related challenges Air Serv has faced. Air fields that these pilots use are sometimes just desert areas marked by rocks showing where the pilots must land.
