= Rebecca Mpagi =

Ugandan military aircraft maintenance engineer

Brigadier Rebecca Mpagi
- Born: 1956 (age 69–70); Wakiso District, Uganda
- Education: Nabisunsa Girls' Secondary School; Kololo Secondary School; Kianda Secretarial College, Nairobi; East African Civil Aviation Academy
- Occupations: Aircraft Maintenance Engineer, military officer
- Years active: 1986–present
- Title: Director of Personnel and Administration in the UPDF Air Force

Brigadier Rebecca Mpagi, is a Ugandan military officer and Aircraft Maintenance Engineer, who serves as the Director of Personnel and Administration in the UPDF Air Force. She is credited as the first female in Uganda to qualify as a military aircraft maintenance engineer.

== Background and education ==
Mpagi was born in the Buganda Region of Uganda circa 1956, to Yunia Nakibuuka Mpagi and Charles William Mpagi. She was the 11th born out of 14 children. She attended Kasanje Primary School before transferring to Jungo Junior School, in Wakiso District, where she completed her primary schooling.

She studied at Nabisunsa Girls' Secondary School for her O-Level studies. She then completed her A-Level education at Kololo High School, where she obtained a High School Diploma, in 1974.

She studied at Kianda Secretarial College, Nairobi, graduating with a Diploma in Secretarial Studies. In 1978, she was admitted to the East African Civil Aviation Academy in Soroti, graduating as an Aircraft Maintenance Engineer, in 1982. She has taken a number of military courses and training in guidance and counselling.

In 2019, Mpagi was awarded an Honorary Doctor of Divinity degree by Zoe Life Theological Collège, based in Collingdale, Pennsylvania, United States.

== Career ==
Her first job was as a secretary at the lawyer's office in the Eastern Ugandan city of Mbale. However, the lawyer who employed her was murdered during the Uganda–Tanzania War (October 1978 until June 1979), which removed Idi Amin from power. That is when she enrolled in flight school.

She joined the National Resistance Army in 1986. After basic training, she gradually rose through the ranks, from Second Lieutenant (1988), Lieutenant (1990), Captain (1999), Major (2002) and Lieutenant Colonel (2008). As of June 2012, she was the Director of Women's Affairs at the Directorate of Women's Affairs at UPDF Headquarters, at Mbuya, a suburb of Kampala, Uganda's capital and largest city. Since then, she has been promoted to a full Colonel and assigned as Director of Personnel and Administration at the UPDF Air Force, based in Entebbe.

On 28 March 2020, she was promoted from the rank of Colonel to that of Brigadier.

== Family ==
Mpagi is a mother of four daughters.

== See also ==
- Kwatsi Alibaruho
- Michael Etiang
- Gad Gasatura
- Kokoro Janda
- Robert Kateera
- Vanita Kayiwa
- Ali Kiiza
- Naomi Karungi
- Kenneth Kiyemba
- Brian Mushana Kwesiga
