= AfricaOne (Uganda) =

Airline based in Uganda

IATA	ICAO	Call sign
-	CFR	-
- Founded: 29 April 2002
- Ceased operations: 2009
- Parent company: DAS Air Cargo
- Headquarters: Entebbe, Uganda
- Key people: Joe Roy (Chairman)

AfricaOne was a privately owned pan-African airline based in Entebbe, Uganda. AfricaOne operated from 2002 to 2009 with aircraft wet leased from AfricaOne Services, registered in Ireland.

Although it shared a very similar name with the Congolese airline Africa One, the two companies are unrelated.

== History ==
AfricaOne was formally launched on April 29, 2002. It was the successor to the defunct Ugandan airline Alliance Air. Unlike previous attempts to establish a pan-African airline, AfricaOne is owned entirely by private African entrepreneurs without any involvement from governments. Boeing subsidiary Boeing Capital Corporation provided the financing for the startup airline.

The airline was founded by DAS Air Cargo executive director Charles Heather, who also took on the role of CEO of AfricaOne Holdings. Heather's business partner and DAS Air Cargo chairman Capt. Joe Roy became the chairman of AfricaOne Holdings. Both were shareholders in the holding company. Roy also piloted the airline's maiden voyage from London to Entebbe.

The aircraft were provided by the Ireland-registered AfricaOne Services on an ACMI (aircraft, crew, maintenance and insurance) basis.

== Destinations ==
AfricaOne served Entebbe in Uganda, Lagos in Nigeria, Freetown in Sierra Leone, and Banjul in The Gambia using DC-9s with a bi-weekly service from those cities to London Gatwick and Dubai using DC-10s. Flights between Entebbe and Nairobi in Kenya were later added on September 20, 2002.
