= Rita Nasirumbi =

Ugandan commercial aviator

- Born: Uganda
- Citizenship: Uganda
- Education: East African Civil Aviation Academy (Commercial pilot licence) (ICAO Airline Transport Pilots License)
- Occupation: Professional pilot
- Years active: since 2019
- Title: Flight Captain at Uganda National Airlines Company

Rita Nasirumbi is a Ugandan airline transport pilot, who, since 13 October 2026, serves as a Flight Captain on the CRJ900 flight equipment at Uganda National Airlines Company, the national airline carrier. She is the first female cockpit crew to qualify as a flight captain at Uganda Airlines. Before that, from April 2019 until October 2026, she flew as a first officer on the same equipment at the same airline.

== Background and education ==
She is a Ugandan national by birth. She studied at the East African Civil Aviation Academy in Soroti, Uganda, where she obtained the Commercial pilot licence. Later, she obtained the ICAO Airline Transport Pilots License.

== Career ==
In April 2019, following the revival of Uganda Airlines, the airline hired a small number of female aviators among the cockpit crews to pilot their new planes. Rita Nasirumbi was hired as a first officer on the CRJ900 equipment. After a period of more than seven years, Nasirumbi was promoted to flight captain on the CRJ900 on 13 October 2026. As of then, she is the first and only female Flight Captain among Uganda Airlines' pilots.

== Other considerations ==
Her promotion to flight captain is expected to inspire other young women considering to pursue a career in aviation in general and as pilots in particular.

== See also ==
- Tina Drazu
- Vanita Kayiwa
- Robert Wakhweya
