= Adjumani General Hospital =

- Uganda Ministry of Health
- Location within Uganda

Geography
- Location: Adjumani, Adjumani District, Uganda
- Coordinates: 03°22′27″N 31°47′33″E

Organisation
- Care system: Public
- Type: General

Services
- Emergency department: I
- Beds: 100

History
- Founded: 2000

Links
- Lists: Hospitals in Uganda
- Other links: Hospitals in Uganda

Adjumani General Hospital, also Adjumani Hospital, is a hospital in Adjumani Town, Adjumani District, in the Northern Region of Uganda. It is a public hospital, owned by the Ugandan Government and is administered by the Uganda Ministry of Health.

== Location ==
The hospital is located in the central business district of the town of Adjumani, about 201 kilometres (125 mi) northeast of Arua Regional Referral Hospital. This is approximately 106 kilometres (66 mi), northwest of Gulu Regional Referral Hospital.

The geographical coordinates of Adjumani General Hospital are:03°22'27.0"N, 31°47'33.0"E (Latitude:3.374176; Longitude:31.792498).

== Overview ==
Adjumani Hospital was constructed in 2000 with a loan from the African Development Bank. The facility sits on a land site that measures 7,807 square metres (1.929 acres). It has a bed capacity of 100 and averages about 200 outpatient daily visits. About 10 babies are delivered daily on average. Major illnesses include malaria and respiratory infections. Patients come from as far away as South Sudan and people from the neighboring districts of Amuru and Moyo and those from Adjumani District itself.

== See also ==
- List of hospitals in Uganda
