= List of satellite television service providers in Uganda =

This is a list of digital television service providers in Uganda.

== Pay TV operators ==
These were the eight pay television operating companies in Uganda, including mode of transmission and area of coverage, as of January 2019.

List of satellite television service providers in Uganda
Rank	Company	Technology	Coverage	Notes
1	MultiChoice Uganda (DStv)	Satellite	Nationwide	
2	Zuku Television	Satellite	Nationwide	
3	Azam Television	Satellite	Nationwide	
4	StarSat	Satellite	Nationwide	
5	StarTimes	Terrestrial	Central Uganda, Western Uganda, Gulu	
6	Gotv	Terrestrial	Major urban centres	
7	Kampala SITI Cable	Cable	Kampala & Jinja	
8	Kwese TV	Satellite	Nationwide	

At that time, there were 2.2 million pay-television customers in the country, according to the Uganda Communications Commission.

== See also ==
- List of companies based in Uganda
