= Sky Travel and Aviation =

South Sudanese airline company

- Founded: 2019
- Operating bases: Juba International Airport
- Focus cities: Juba, Gulu
- Fleet size: 2
- Destinations: 2
- Headquarters: Juba, South Sudan
- Key people: Cosmas Gumura; Managing Director

Sky Travel and Aviation was a privately owned airline in South Sudan that was founded and began operating in 2019. It commenced operations on 19 October 2019, when it launched its maiden flight from Juba International Airport in South Sudan to Gulu Airport in neighboring Uganda.

== Location ==
The airline maintained its headquarters in the city of Juba, the capital of South Sudan.

== History ==
In October, Sky Aviation and Travel began twice-weekly flights between Juba International Airport and Gulu Airport in Uganda. It is expected that as traffic picks up on this route, new service will be established between Gulu Airport and Entebbe International Airport, Uganda's largest civilian and military airport.

== Destinations ==
As of October 2019, Sky Travel and Aviation maintained regular services to the following destinations:

- South Sudan
  - Juba: Juba International Airport (main hub)
- Uganda
  - Gulu: Gulu Airport

== Fleet ==
The Sky Travel and Aviation fleet consists of the following aircraft as of October 2019.

Sky Travel and Aviation fleet
Aircraft	In fleet	Order	Passengers	Notes
C-208B Grand Caravan	1	0	12	
C-208B Grand Caravan EX	1	0	19	
Total	2	0		

== See also ==
- List of airlines of South Sudan
