= Yei Airport =

Airport in South Sudan

- IATA: n/a; ICAO: HSYE

Summary
- Airport type: Public, Civilian
- Owner: Civil Aviation Authority of South Sudan
- Serves: Yei, South Sudan
- Location: Yei, South Sudan
- Elevation AMSL: 2,726 ft / 831 m
- Coordinates: 04°07′57″N 30°43′17″E

Map

Runways
Direction	Length		Surface
Direction	ft	m	Surface
	4,921	1,500	Unpaved

Yei Airport is an airport serving Yei in South Sudan.

== Location ==
Yei Airport (IATA: n/a, ICAO: HSYE) is located in Yei River County in Central Equatoria, in the city of Yei, in the southern part of South Sudan, near the International borders with Uganda and the Democratic Republic of the Congo. The airport is located northeast of the central business district, on the road to Juba.

This location lies approximately 135 kilometres (84 mi), by air, southwest of Juba International Airport, the largest airport in South Sudan. The geographic coordinates of this airport are: 4° 7' 57.00"N, 30° 43' 17.00"E (Latitude: 4.132500; Longitude: 30.721390). Yei Airport is situated 831 metres (2,726 ft) above sea level. The airport has a single unpaved runway, the dimensions of which are not publicly known at this time.

== Airlines and destinations ==
Airlines	Destinations
Eagle Air	Arua, Entebbe

== See also ==
- Yei, South Sudan
- Central Equatoria
- Equatoria
- List of airports in South Sudan
