= East African Civil Aviation Academy =

Ugandan Aviation school

Coordinates: 01°43′15″N 33°37′03″E

- Type: Public
- Established: 1971; 55 years ago
- Vice-Chancellor: Lieutenant Colonel Ronald Turyamubona
- Students: 108 (2013)
- Location: Soroti, Uganda
- Campus: Urban
- Website: Homepage

The East African Civil Aviation Academy (EACAA), also known as the Soroti Flying School, is a Ugandan school that trains aircraft pilots and aircraft maintenance engineers.

== Location ==
The school is based at Soroti Airport, (IATA: SRT, ICAO: HUSO), in the town of Soroti in the Eastern Region of Uganda. It is approximately 228 kilometres (142 mi), by air, north-east of Entebbe International Airport, Uganda's largest civilian and military airport. The coordinates of the airport are 1°43'15.0"N; 33°37'03.0"E (Latitude:1.720833; Longitude:33.617500).

== Overview ==
As of May 2018, the flying school was undergoing renovations and a certification process to become a center of aviation excellence in the region. New technical staff have been recruited, including (a) a Director (b) a Quality Manager (c) a Safety Manager (d) a Chief Engineering Instructor (d) Flying instructors (e) Ground instructors (f) Engineering instructors and (g) Flight Operations Instructors. At that time the school had nine training aircraft. By May 2018, nine pilot-trainees, seven aircraft maintenance engineers and fourteen flight operations officers had completed training during the calendar year. Another fifteen pilots, fifteen flight operations engineers and five aircraft maintenance engineers were expected to graduate during the second half of 2018.

== History ==
EACAA was founded in September 1971 under the Directorate of Civil Aviation of the EAC. The government of Uganda, the East African Community (EAC), the United Nations Development Programme, and the International Civil Aviation Organization were the major contributors.

When the first EAC collapsed in 1977, the Ugandan government took over the management and maintenance of the school. In 2012, the government began the process of returning the school to the EAC.

In late 2013, the Ugandan government entered into preliminary discussions with Integra, a private Danish aviation company, to improve and manage the school at international standards under a public-private-partnership (PPP) arrangement. Discussions at the Ugandan cabinet level have also been held about returning the school to the EAC.

In 2014, the EAC Council of Ministers agreed to take it back. On 3 July 2014, the presidents of Kenya, Uganda, and Rwanda agreed in principle to re-instate the EACAA as one of the centres of excellence in the EAC.

However, due to the failure of partner states to remit operational and development funds to the school, the Ugandan Cabinet, in March 2019, formally resolved to take over the ownership and management of the academy.

It is expected that the academy will expand its training programs to include pilots and aircraft maintenance engineers from (a) UPDF Air Force (b) Uganda National Airlines Company (c) Uganda Police Air Wing (d) Ugandan Presidential Fleet (e) Commercial and General aviation. This would save Uganda dollars in foreign exchange, currently spent on procuring this training outside the country.

== Developments ==
In 2026, Uganda Airlines in collaboration with the Boeing Corporation announced plans to equip and develop the flying school to train pilots, aviation engineers and flight technicians for direct employment by the national carrier. Under the arrangement, Boeing is expected to furnish the school with equipment and facilities, including flight simulators. The airline will then recruit fresh university graduates and the school will train them with specialization on Boeing aircraft including B737-800 Max, B787-9, B767 and others in the airline's fleet or on their order book. The airline would contract them for employment at the beginning of their training.

== Notable alumni ==
- Robert Wakhweya: Captain on Airbus A350 and A330 series. Chief Pilot at Uganda Airlines
- Michael Etiang: Captain on the CRJ900 and Airbus A330 series. Former Chief Pilot at Uganda Airlines
- Vanita Kayiwa: First Officer on the CRJ900ER and Airbus A330-841 at Uganda Airlines
- Rita Nasirumbi: Captain on the CRJ900 at Uganda Airlines. First female captain at Uganda Airlines.
- Esther Mbabazi: Captain on the B737 and First Officer on the CRJ900 at RwandAir.
- Ivan Massa: First Officer on the CRJ900 and the A330neo at Uganda Airlines.
- Naomi Karungi (1978 – 2020): Major Karungi was the Squadron Commander of Augusta Bell Helicopters in the UPDF Air Force.
- Rebecca Mpagi: Brigadier in the UPDF. Aircraft Maintenance Engineer, who served as the Director of Personnel and Administration in the UPDF Air Force.

== See also ==
- Uganda Aviation School
- List of aviation schools in Uganda
