= Dominica Dipio =

Ugandan nun, filmmaker, author, and professor

Dominic Dipio
- Born: Adjumani, Uganda
- Education: Makerere University
- Occupations: Author, filmmaker, professor
- Years active: 1991-present

Dominica or Dominic Dipio (professionally referred to as Professor Sister Dominic Dipio) is a Ugandan religious sister, a filmmaker, author and professor of Literature and Film at Makerere University in Kampala, Uganda. As a sister, she belongs to the Institute of the Missionary Sisters of Mary Mother of the Church, MSMMC, a Ugandan-founded religious congregation in Roman Catholic Diocese of Lira in Northern Uganda. In November 2019 she was appointed Consultor of the Pontifical Council for Culture by Pope Francis.

== Background and education ==
Dipio was born in Adjumani in the West Nile region of Uganda. She attended Saint Mary's Girls', Aboke, for her O' Level before proceeding to Trinity College Nabbingo for her A' Levels. She subsequently attended Makerere University and obtained a Bachelor of Arts in education and then a master's degree in literature. In 1991, Dipio undertook a certificate in Women's Studies at the then Faculty of Social Sciences at Makerere University. In 2004, she completed her PhD in Film studies at the Pontifical Gregorian University in Rome. She concurrently lectured on introduction to film criticism and African cinema at the same university as she underwent her studies. In 2010, she was named a Presidential Fellow of the Rutgers University-based African Studies Association.

== Career ==
In academia, Dipio is a professor of literature and in 2007 was appointed Head of the Literature Department at Makerere University, making her the first African female head of the department. She has also served as a consultant on curriculum development most notably when Uganda's Kyambogo University, in partnership with the United Nations Educational, Scientific and Cultural Organisation (UNESCO), was preparing to develop a curriculum on cultural heritage.

Dipio is involved in the Uganda film industry having directed and produced a number of films and documentaries. She has served as a judge and member of jury at a number of film festivals such as the Zanzibar International Film Festival (ZIFF) in 2011, the Amakula Film festival, and served as chief judge at the inaugural Uganda Film Festival in 2013 as well as at others after that.

In February 2019, Dipio was one of the jury members at the Ecumenical Film Awards at the Berlinale Film Festival in Germany. The annual Ecumenical film award which was in its 27th year was organised by the International Interchurch Film Organization (Interfilm) and the World Catholic Association for Communication (SIGNIS).

Prior to her appointment as Consultor, Dipio served as one of several consultants to the Pontifical Council for Social Communication in the Vatican at the appointment of Pope Benedict XVI in 2011. She was simultaneously a member of the Uganda Episcopal Conference Social Communications Commission.

== Selected publications ==
- Dipio, Dominica; Johannessen, Lene; Sillars, Stuart, eds. (2008). Performing Community: Essays on Ugandan Oral Culture. Oslo: Novus Press. ISBN 9788270994991.
- Makokha, J. K. S.; Kabaji, Egara; Dipio, Dominica, eds. (2011). East African Literature: Essays on Written and Oral Traditions. Berlin: Logos. ISBN 978-3-8325-2816-4.
- Dipio, Dominica (2014). Gender Terrains in African Cinema. Pretoria: UNISA Press. ISBN 9781868887354.
- Nabutanyi, Edgar Fred; Kahyana, Danson; Dipio, Dominica, eds. (2019). Discourse and identities : writing and contemporary eastern African peripheral subjectivities. Kampala: Fountain. ISBN 9789970195268.

== Films and documentaries ==
- Mother-Centered Africa (2019)
- Word Craft (2017)
- Rainmaking: A disappearing practice (2016)
- "It is the Law" (2010)
- A meal to forget : a man guilty of trying too hard (2009), winner of Arts Press Association Award
- Crafting the Bamasaba (2009)
- Dearly Beloved (2007)
