= Uganda Airlines Flight 775 =

1988 aviation accident in Italy

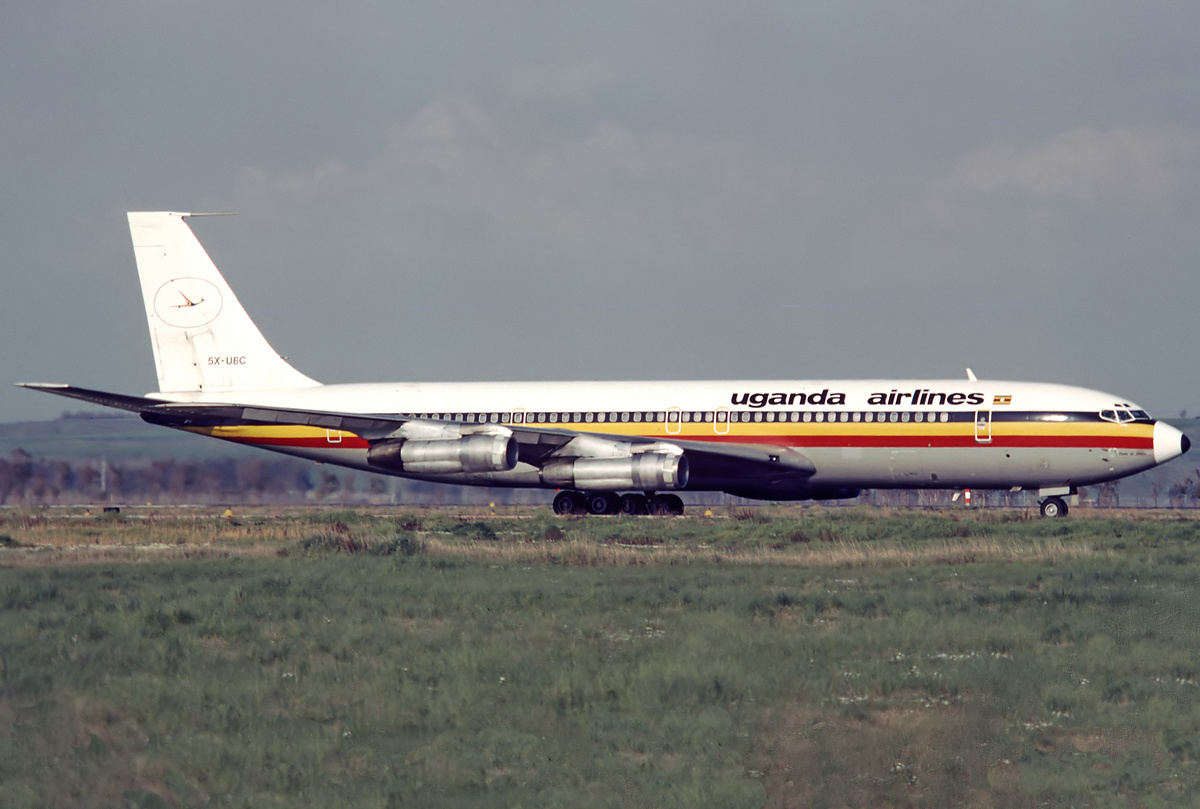
- 5X-UBC, the aircraft involved in the accident, seen in 1983

Accident
- Date: 17 October 1988
- Summary: Pilot error in inclement weather
- Site: Rome-Fiumicino Airport, Rome, Italy; 41.8044°N 12.2508°E

Aircraft
- Aircraft type: Boeing 707-338C
- Operator: Uganda Airlines
- IATA flight No.: QU775
- ICAO flight No.: UGA775
- Call sign: UGANDA 775
- Registration: 5X-UBC
- Flight origin: London Gatwick Airport, London, United Kingdom
- Stopover: Rome-Fiumicino Airport, Rome, Italy
- Destination: Entebbe Airport, Entebbe, Uganda
- Occupants: 52
- Passengers: 45
- Crew: 7
- Fatalities: 33
- Survivors: 19

Uganda Airlines Flight 775 was a Boeing 707, registration 5X-UBC, that crashed while attempting to land at Rome-Fiumicino Airport in Rome, Italy on 17 October 1988. Out of the 52 occupants onboard, 33 were killed.

== Flight ==
Flight 775 took off from London-Gatwick bound for Entebbe with an intermediate stop in Rome. While descending into Rome, the flight crew was given clearance for an ILS approach to runway 16L. Due to poor visibility, a missed approach was carried out. A second approach was attempted to runway 25. This too had to be abandoned due to weather conditions. The crew requested radar vectoring to runway 34L. The aircraft was established on the localiser but descended through minimum safe altitude. The aircraft impacted with some trees, then crashed, broke into pieces, and burst into flames approximately 0.8 kilometres (0.50 mi) short of the runway.

One of the 19 survivors was a former Ugandan ambassador to the Vatican.

== Cause ==
The probable cause of the crash was determined to be:

"The crew's lack of adequate preparation in the procedure for a Non Precision Approach on runway 34L at Fiumicino Airport, especially in the matter of crew coordination and altitude callouts and their continued descent beyond MDA without having located the runway visual markings."

The following factors may have contributed to the cause of the accident:

- "Presumed mental and physical fatigue, accumulated by the crew during the two previous landing approaches, which were also carried out in an environmental situation that was extremely unfavourable and operationally demanding.;
- A configuration of the Altitude Instruments, which although sufficient for the approaches that were carried out, consisted of a single radio altimeter with the acoustic warning of the MDA crossing inoperative;
- The attention of the crew was excessively concentrated on the luminous sources along runway 34L, instead of on the instrument readings.

Part of the Board of Inquiry as well as the representative of the Ugandan CA, dissociated themselves from the majority, during the phase of identifying the factors that may have contributed to causing the accident."
