= Eagle Air (Uganda) =

Ugandan airline

Coordinates: 00°18′51″N 32°35′06″E

Eagle Air Uganda Limited
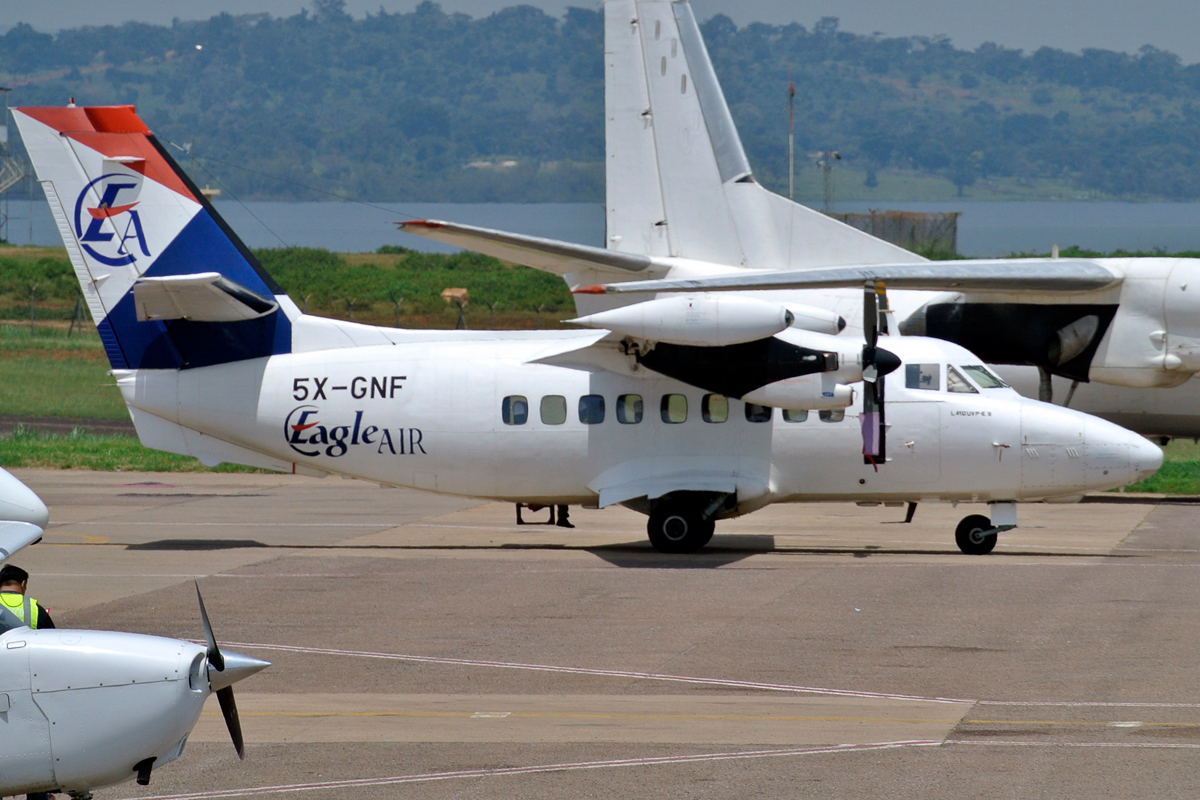
IATA	ICAO	Call sign
H7	EGU	AFRICAN EAGLE
- Founded: 1994; 32 years ago
- Hubs: Entebbe International Airport
- Secondary hubs: Arua Airport
- Focus cities: Kampala, Entebbe, Arua
- Fleet size: 6
- Destinations: 8
- Parent company: Eagle Aviation (Uganda) Limited
- Headquarters: Kampala, Uganda
- Website: Homepage

Eagle Air is an airline based in Kampala, Uganda. It operates regional scheduled services and charter flights across East and Central Africa. Its main base is Entebbe International Airport, and it also maintains a second hub at Arua Airport, in the Northern Region of the country.

== History ==
The airline was established in June 1994 and started operations in November 1994.

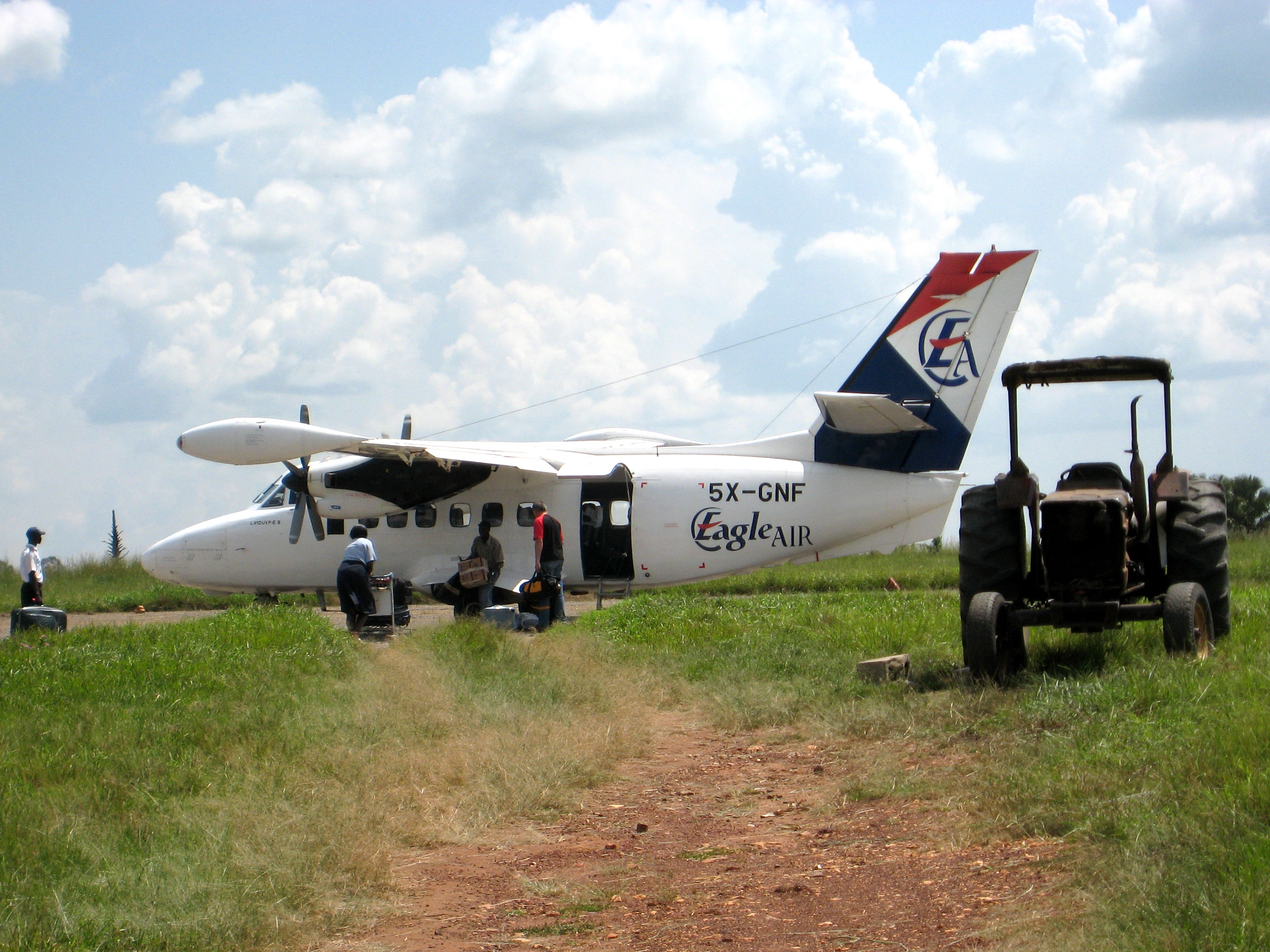
An Eagle Air Let L410UVP-E9 Turbolet at Gulu Airport

In 2006, the airline started operations to Uganda's national parks. That same year, South Sudan banned Eagle Air from operations to the airport in Yei, alleging violations of the country's aviation regulations.

In 2008, the airline temporarily suspended operations due to a fuel shortage in Uganda, that arose out of the political violence in Kenya, following the 2007 presidential elections.

== Services ==
Eagle Air offers scheduled and chartered flights to domestic and certain regional destinations, including air safaris to Ugandan national parks. In addition, it offers chartered flights within the East and Central Africa Region.

== Destinations ==
According to its website, as of May 2019 Eagle Air Uganda operates regular services to the following destinations:

Country	City	Airport	Notes	Refs
Uganda	Adjumani	Adjumani Airport	—	
Uganda	Arua	Arua Airport	Hub	
Uganda	Chobe	Chobe Safari Lodge Airport	—	
Uganda	Entebbe/Kampala	Entebbe International Airport	Hub	
Uganda	Gulu	Gulu Airport	—	
Uganda	Pakuba	Pakuba Airport	—	
South Sudan	Juba	Juba Airport	—	
South Sudan	Yei	Yei Airport	—	

== Fleet ==
As of January 2025, the Eagle Air fleet includes:

Eagle Air (Uganda) fleet
Aircraft	In fleet	Orders	Passengers				Notes
Aircraft	In fleet	Orders	F	C	Y	Total	Notes
Let L-410 Turbolet	3	0	0	0	19	19	
Cessna 206	1	0	0	0	4	4	
Total	4						

== Accidents and incidents ==
- A 2001 Eagle Air crash in the eastern Democratic Republic of the Congo, killed two Congolese rebel leaders, the Eagle Air captain, the first officer and two other individuals, for a total of six fatalities.
- In January 2025, a Beechcraft 1900 operated by Eagle Air on behalf of Light Air Services crashed shortly after takeoff from Unity oilfield in South Sudan, killing twenty of the twenty-one people on board.

== See also ==
- List of airlines of Uganda
