= Soroti Airport =

Airport in Uganda

- IATA: SRT; ICAO: HUSO

Summary
- Airport type: Public
- Owner: Civil Aviation Authority of Uganda
- Operator: Soroti Flying School
- Serves: Soroti, Uganda
- Elevation AMSL: 3,697 ft (1,127 m)
- Coordinates: 01°43′30″N 33°37′15″E

Map
- Location of the airport in Uganda

Runways
Direction	Length		Surface
Direction	m	ft	Surface
05/23	1,860	6,102	Asphalt
09/27	750	2,461	Laterite
- Sources: GCM

Soroti Airport (IATA: SRT, ICAO: HUSO) is an airport serving Soroti, a town in the Eastern Region of Uganda, approximately 290 kilometres (180 mi), by road, north-east of Kampala, Uganda's capital and largest city. The main runway and apron are asphalt and can support aircraft up to the size of a Boeing 737, without damage to the surface. The airport is at an altitude of 3,697 feet (1,127 m), above sea level.

== History ==
The airport was originally built as a school for the British Overseas Airways Corporation to train their pilots in tropical flying techniques. It was later used by the East African Civil Aviation Academy to train pilots from the East African Community.

As of June 2018, the airport is home to the Soroti Flying School, which has various aircraft, including a Cessna 310. The flying school provides training through instrument and multi-engine ratings. The flying school has dormitories, food service, and classrooms.

== Airlines and destinations ==
It is possible to get non-scheduled flights through Eagle Air Uganda.

== Home to UPDF helicopter squadron ==
In 2017, the United States donated five refurbished Bell Huey II military helicopters, to the Uganda People's Defence Force, to assist in the AMISOM mission. The helicopter squadron is expected to be based at Soroti.

== See also ==
- Transport in Uganda
- List of airports in Uganda
