= Arua Airport =

Airport in Uganda

- IATA: RUA; ICAO: HUAR

Summary
- Airport type: Public
- Owner: Uganda Civil Aviation Authority
- Serves: Arua, Uganda
- Elevation AMSL: 3,951 ft / 1,204 m
- Coordinates: 3°02′50″N 30°54′44″E

Map
- Location of airport in Uganda

Runways
Direction	Length		Surface
Direction	m	ft	Surface
18/36	1,707	5,600	Unpaved

Arua Airport (IATA: RUA, ICAO: HUAR) is a civilian airport serving the city of Arua in the Northern Region of Uganda. As of November 2016, it is one of the 47 airports in the country.

== Location ==
The airport is 19 kilometres (12 mi) from Uganda's border with the Democratic Republic of the Congo (DRC) and about 32 kilometres (20 mi) from the border between Uganda and South Sudan. It is approximately 375 kilometres (233 mi) by air north-west of Entebbe International Airport, Uganda's largest airport. The coordinates of Arua Airport are: 03°02'50.0"N, 30°54'44.0"E (Latitude:3.047222; Longitude:30.912222).

== Overview ==
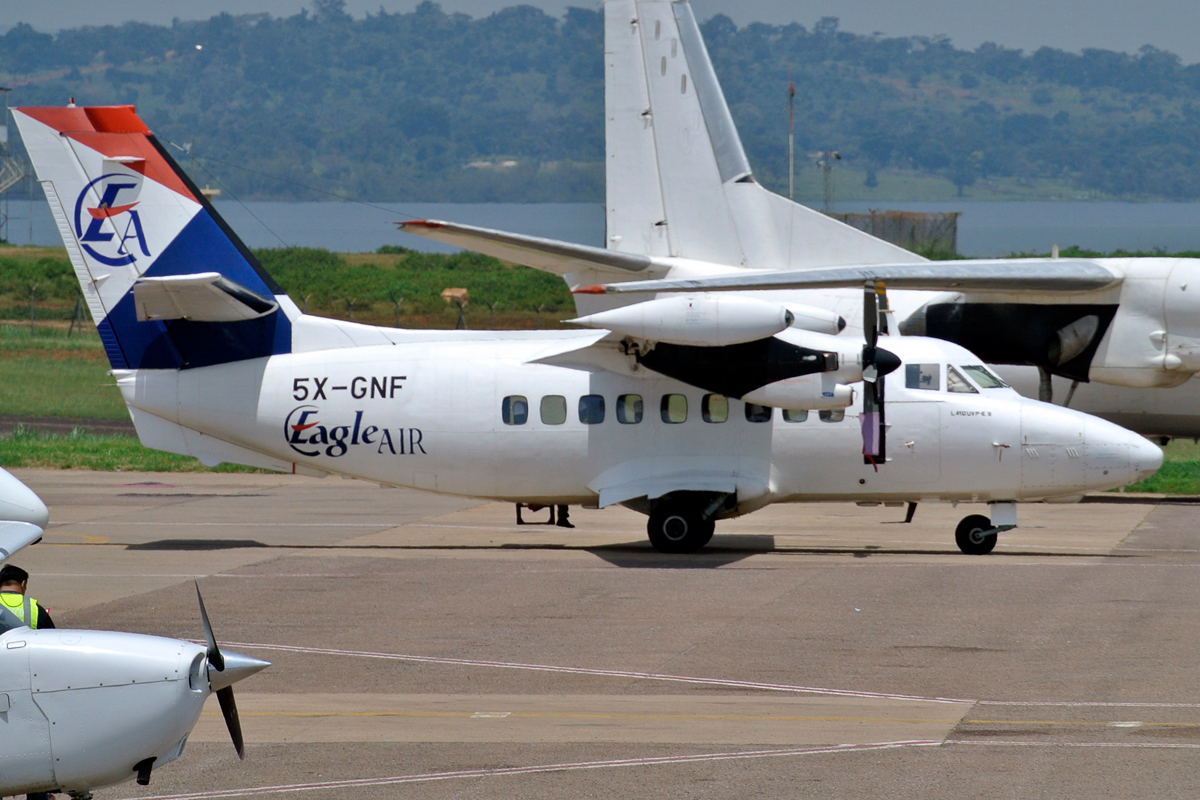
Eagle Air at Entebbe International Airport

Arua Airport's strategic location makes Arua Airport an important center for passenger and cargo air traffic between Uganda and its two neighbors, the DRC and South Sudan. It the second-busiest airport in Uganda, after Entebbe International Airport.

== Airlines and destinations ==
Airlines	Destinations
Eagle Air	Entebbe, Yei
MAF Uganda	Kajjansi
BAR Aviation Uganda	Entebbe

== Planned improvements ==
In July 2009, the Civil Aviation Authority of Uganda, which owns and operates Arua Airport, publicly announced that it had started to upgrade the airport to international standards. Plans included a modern airport terminal with capacity for 200 passengers, paving the runway, widening it to 45 metres (148 ft), and extending it to 2.5 kilometres (8,200 ft). However, these plans have stalled since 2009 because of a compensation dispute with local landowners.

These improvements are part of efforts to improve Arua Airport, Gulu Airport, and Kasese Airport to international standards. When these improvements are complete, Uganda will have four international airports, including the only preexisting international airport at Entebbe.

Arua Airport is one of twelve upcountry airports administered by the Uganda Civil Aviation Authority. It is also one of five upcountry airports authorized to handle cross-border air traffic from neighboring countries to promote tourism within Eastern Africa.

== Developments ==
In February 2024, East of Eden Uganda Limited (EOE), a private investment company signed a memorandum of understanding (MOU) with the Ministry of Works and Transport to fund, execute and publish a feasibility study to convert Arua Airport into Arua International Airport. When the report is published and the parties agree on terms, it is expected that EOE will be awarded a concession to develop the international airport under the build–own–operate–transfer (BOOT) public private partnership arrangement.

In June 2026, the African Development Bank Group approved loans totaling €155.99 million (UGX:650 billion) to finance the upgrade of Arua Airport to international standards. Improvements include (a) Construction of a 3,500 metre paved runway "capable of handling large aircraft such as the Boeing 777" (b) Construction of new taxiways and aprons (c) Construction of a passenger terminal with capacity for 700,000 travellers every year and (d) Construction of a cargo terminal designed to handle 25,000 tonnes per annum.

== Funding ==
The table below outlines the sources of funds for the upgrade of this airport.

Funding of Arua Airport Expansion
Rank	Development partner	Contribution in Euros	Percentage	Notes
1	African Development Bank	141.15 million	89.5	Loan
2	African Development Fund	14.84 million	9.4	Soft Loan
3	Government of Uganda	1.77 million	1.1	Investment
	Total	157.76 million	100.00	

== See also ==
- Transport in Uganda
- List of airports in Uganda
