= Alliance Air (Uganda) =

Ugandan airline

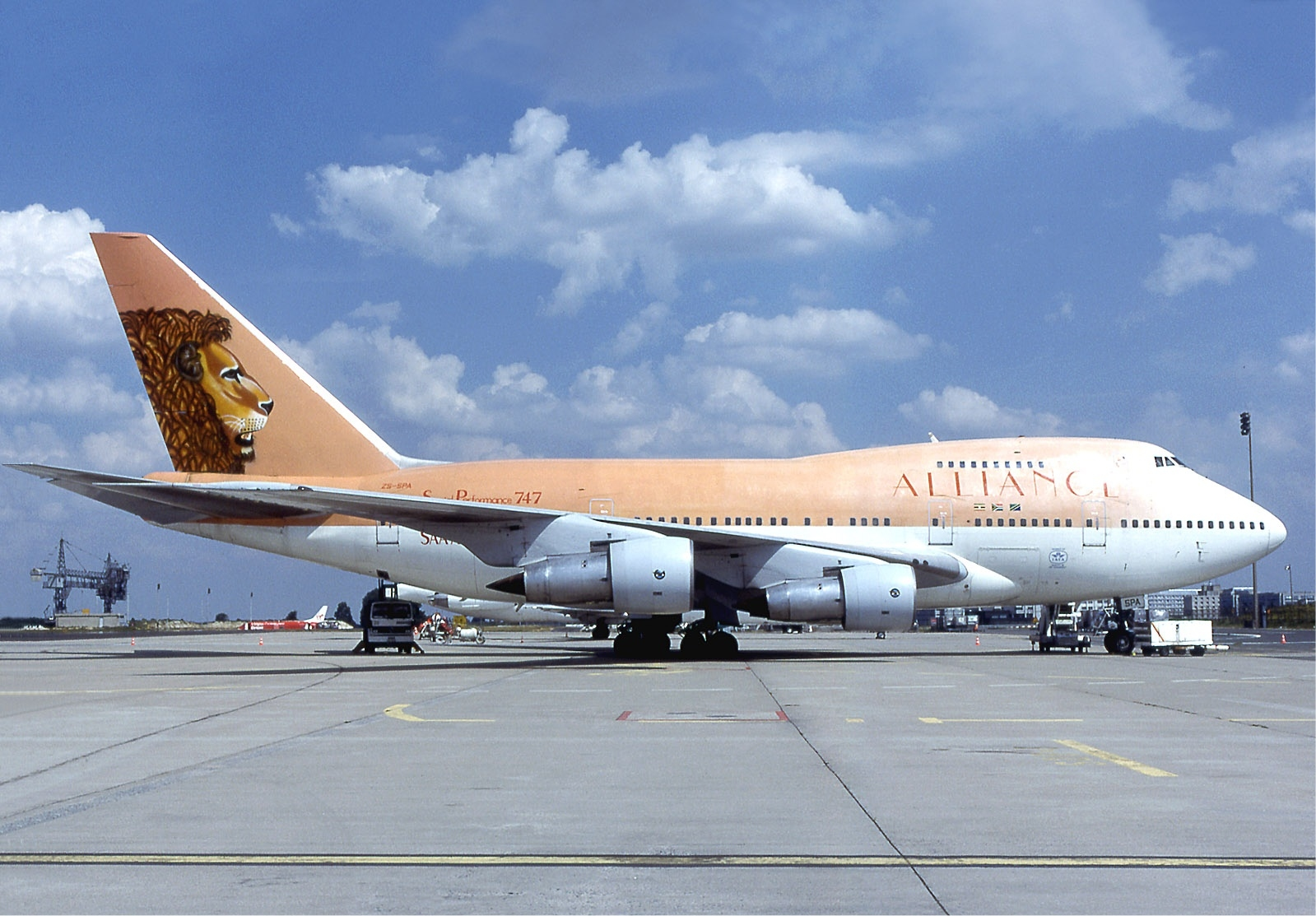
- Alliance Air operated the 747SP
IATA	ICAO	Call sign
Y2	AFJ	JAMBO
- Founded: 12 December 1994
- Commenced operations: July 1995
- Ceased operations: October 2000 (Taken Over By South African Airways)
- Hubs: Entebbe International Airport
- Fleet size: 1
- Destinations: 4
- Key people: Christo Roodt (MD)

Alliance Airlines (later known as SA Alliance Air) was a multi-national long-haul airline based at Entebbe International Airport in Uganda. It was set up in 1995 as a joint venture between South African Airways and the governments of Tanzania and Uganda. The airline ceased operations in 2000.

== History ==
The airline's formation was linked to the African Joint Air Services (AJAS) Accord which was signed in 1990 by Tanzania, Uganda and Zambia, but the latter left in 1992 due to lack of funds. It began operations in July 1995 and operated a single Boeing 747SP leased from SAA, painted in the distinctive Alliance Air colour scheme.

Alliance Air had planned to serve Dar es Salaam, Dubai, Entebbe, Johannesburg, London and Mumbai. Flights to Rome would have been added at a later date. The launch of the airline sent shock waves to Kenya Airways, the dominant airline in the region.

It was renamed SA Alliance Air for a short while with an SA Alliance Express sister airline, as well as featuring a new logo based on the South African Airways flag inspired tail design. However this look was not applied to any aircraft.

== Corporate affairs ==
At inception the airline was led by Christo Roodt as its Managing Director. Members of the board included Michael Katz, Anton Moolman and Mike Myburgh from South Africa; Joseph Mungai and Adrian Sibo from Tanzania and Uganda respectively. In 1998, the airline bought a 49% stake in the Rwandan flag carrier Air Rwanda and operated as Alliance Express.

=== Ownership ===
Its effective shareholding was 40:30:30 owned by SAA, Tanzania and Uganda respectively. However, the actual ownership structure was as follows:

Shareholder	Percentage
Government of Tanzania	5%
Government of Uganda	5%
Air Tanzania Corporation	10%
Uganda Airlines	10%
Held in Trust for Tanzanian and Ugandan private investors	30%
South African Airways	40%
Total	100%

The airline had planned to offload 30% of its equity to Tanzanian and Ugandan investors and this block of shares were held in trust by the governments of the two nations. However, this never materialized.

=== Dissolution ===
Air Tanzania Corporation (ATC) left this venture in June 1998 and its departure was welcomed by the airline calling it a 'constant hindrance'. Uganda Airlines too parted ways the following year.

The joint venture was renamed to SA Alliance Air from 1999 until its demise. Transnet, the parent company of SAA ceased funding the airline in March 2000. Its rationale was to force the two nations in opening their regional and domestic routes to the airline, thus intending to make it the de facto regional carrier. ATC accused SAA of taking over national airlines of the region using the joint venture as a Trojan Horse. The airline required a monthly subsidy of US$420,000 in order to maintain its long-haul flights. SAA was willing to fund its share of the deficit subject to the other partners willingness to fund the remaining 60%.

Uganda's transport minister said there were more than 50 areas of conflict with SAA. In October 2000, the Tanzania Chamber of Commerce, Industry and Agriculture (TCCIA) and Dairo Air Services (DAS) of Uganda offered to buy their governments' stake in the venture.

The airline ceased to operate in 2000 and its last flight, from London to Johannesburg, (via Entebbe) departed on 8 October. Both Tanzania and Uganda cited overdependence on SAA for the joint venture's going concern. It had accumulated losses to the tune of US$50 million

== Destinations ==
During its lifetime, the airline served the following destinations:

City	Country	IATA	ICAO	Airport
Dar es Salaam	Tanzania	DAR	HTDA	Dar es Salaam International Airport
Kilimanjaro	Tanzania	JRO	HTKJ	Kilimanjaro International Airport
Entebbe	Uganda	EBB	HUEN	Entebbe International Airport ^{[Hub]}
London	United Kingdom	LHR	EGLL	London Heathrow Airport

== Fleet ==
Alliance Air operated the following aircraft:

Alliance Air fleet
Aircraft	Total	Introduced	Retired	Notes
Boeing 747SP	1	1995	1999	Leased from South African Airways
Boeing 767-200ER	1	2000	2000	Wet-leased from South African Airways
Fokker F27 Friendship	1	Unknown	Unknown	Leased from Rossair Executive Air Charter

== See also ==
- List of defunct airlines of Uganda
