= Adjumani =

Ugandan town

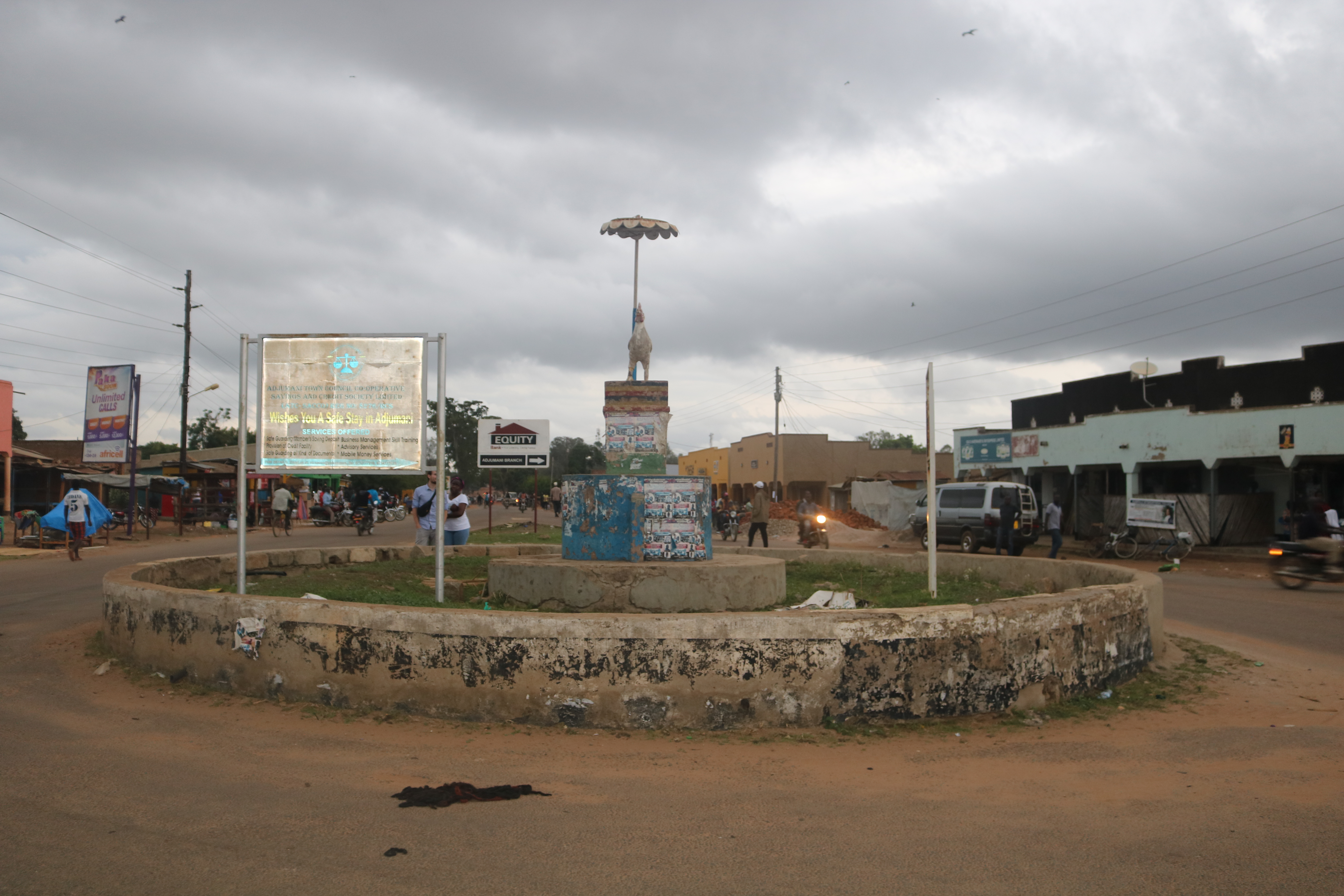
- Roundabout in Adjumani

- Location in Uganda
- Coordinates: 03°22′38″N 31°47′26″E
- Country: Uganda
- Region: Northern Region of Uganda
- Sub-region: West Nile sub-region
- District: Adjumani District
- Elevation: 2,677 ft (816 m)

Population (2020 Estimate)
  - Total: 37,100

Adjumani is a town in the Northern Region of Uganda. It is the main municipal, administrative, and commercial centre of Adjumani District. The district is named after the town.

== Location ==
Adjumani is located in the West Nile sub-region, approximately 196 kilometres (122 mi), by road, northeast of Arua, the largest city in the sub-region. Adjumani is located approximately 116 kilometres (72 mi), northwest of Gulu, the largest city in Uganda's Northern Region.

This is approximately 445 kilometres (277 mi), north-northwest of Kampala, the capital and largest city of Uganda. The coordinates of the town are 3°22'38.0"N, 31°47'26.0"E (Latitude:3.377222; Longitude:31.790556). Adjumani Town Council sits at an average elevation of 816 metres (2,677 ft), above mean sea level.

== Population ==
The 1991 national census enumerated the population of the town at 2,108. The 2002 census put the town's population at 19,876. The national census and household survey of 2014 enumerated the people in the town at 35,433 inhabitants.

In 2015, Uganda Bureau of Statistics (UBOS) estimated the population of Adjumani Town Council at 35,600 people. In 2020, the population agency put the town's population of the town at 37,100; of whom 19,400 (52.3 percent) were female and 17,700 (47.7 percent) were male. UBOS calculated that the population of the town increased at an average rate of 0.83 percent, annually, between 2015 and 2020.

Adjumani is also home to more than 200,000 refugees and asylum seekers from eight African countries, though the vast majority are from nearby South Sudan, making it host to the largest refugee population in the country.

Historical population
Year	Pop.	±%
1991	2,108	—
2002	19,876	+842.9%
2014	35,433	+78.3%
2015	35,600	+0.5%
2020	37,100	+4.2%

== Points of interest ==
The following additional points of interest lie within town or close to its borders: (a) the offices of Adjumani Town Council (b) the headquarters of Adjumani District Administration (c) Adjumani General Hospital, a 100-bed public hospital administered by the Uganda Ministry of Health and (d) Adjumani Airport, a civilian airdrome administered by the Uganda Civil Aviation Authority.

== Notable people ==
- Dominica Dipio, a Ugandan religious sister, filmmaker, author and professor

== See also ==
- List of cities and towns in Uganda
