= Gulu Airport =

Airport in Uganda

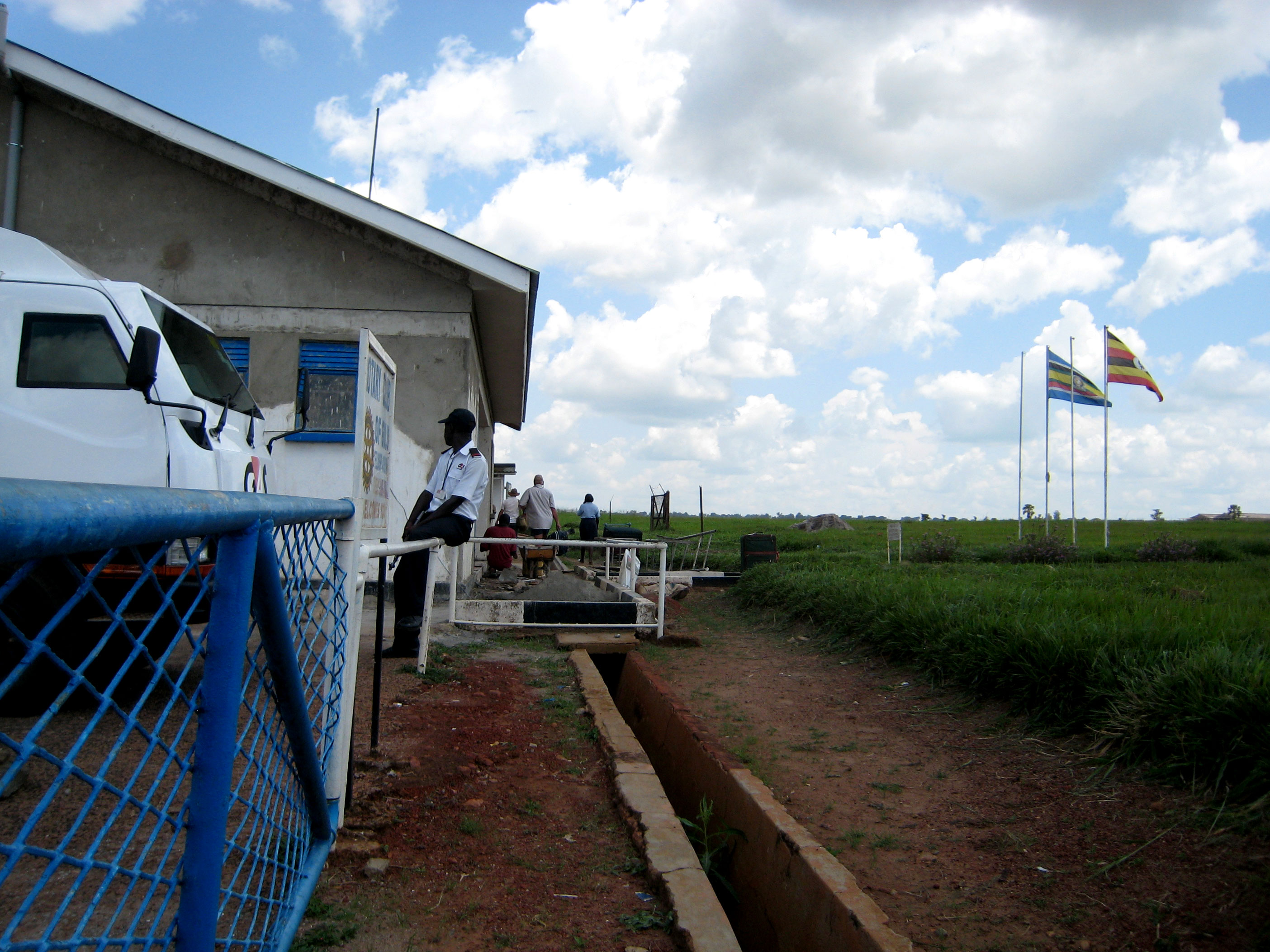
- IATA: ULU; ICAO: HUGU

Summary
- Airport type: Public and military
- Operator: Uganda Civil Aviation Authority
- Serves: Gulu, Uganda
- Elevation AMSL: 3,510 ft / 1,070 m
- Coordinates: 02°47′58″N 32°16′31″E

Map
- Location of airport in Uganda

Runways
Direction	Length		Surface
Direction	m	ft	Surface
17/35	3,135	10,285	Asphalt

Gulu Airport (IATA: ULU, ICAO: HUGU) is a civilian and military airport in the Northern Region of Uganda. It is a designated entry and exit point in and out of the country.

== Location ==
The airport is located 3 kilometres (1.9 mi) north-west of the central business district of Gulu, the largest metropolitan area in the Northern Region. The airport is approximately 306 kilometres (190 mi), by air, north of Entebbe International Airport, Uganda's largest civilian and military airport. The geographical coordinates of Gulu Airport are: 02°47'58.0"N, 32°16'31.0"E (Latitude:2.799444; 32.275278). The airport sits at an elevation of 3,510 feet (1,070 m) above mean sea level.

== Overview ==
The airport serves the city of Gulu, with an estimated population of 177,400 in 2020. It is one of the twelve upcountry airports under the administration of the Uganda Civil Aviation Authority (UCAA). It is also one of the five upcountry airports authorized to handle cross-border air traffic between Uganda and neighboring countries, in an effort to promote tourism within Eastern Africa.

Eagle Air has regular flights from Entebbe International Airport on Mondays and Thursdays. As of October 2019, Sky Travel and Aviation also offers twice-weekly flights from Juba International Airport in South Sudan. Charter flights between Gulu and Moyo Airport, Arua Airport, and Pakuba Airport are also occasionally flown.

== History ==
Dutch multinational company Fugro's airborne survey division was contracted by the government of Uganda to perform airborne geophysical mineral exploration surveys throughout Uganda between 2006 and 2009. To perform its duties in the Northern Region, the company based two aircraft out of Gulu with daily low-level (80 meters above ground level) flights up to the Sudanese border. In 2019 the South African company Xcalibur Airborne Geophysics, was hired to carry out similar exploration work over Northeastern Uganda.

During the course of the air campaign of the Uganda–Tanzania War (1978–79), Gulu Air Base hosted Ugandan and Libyan military aircraft.

During the 21 years of civil war between the rebel Lord’s Resistance Army (LRA) and the Ugandan government, the Ugandan Air Force was actively based from Gulu. Since the LRA rebel activity ended, the Gulu military presence has been reduced to a sizeable ground force with no aircraft, based around the military hangars west of runway 35. The Air Force Base is used to train UPDF fighter pilots, as of 2019.

== Facilities ==
The facilities at the airport include terminal, fire and rescue, and transportation services. Fuel, immigration, and customs services are available on arrangement. However, weather service is not available locally.

In 2019, Yoweri Museveni, the President of Uganda, indicated that Gulu Airport was going to be upgraded to international standards, including construction of a new, larger cargo terminal building, improving firefighting capacity and installing floodlights for the runway. Other planned improvements include new aircraft hangars, control towers, access routes, ground markings and parking areas for both aircraft and vehicles.

In January 2014, phased renovation of the airport was commissioned by the Ugandan Minister of Works and Transport. The first phase involves resurfacing and lengthening the asphalt runway to 3.14 kilometres (10,300 ft) and widening it to 45 metres (148 ft) at a budgeted cost of US$4 million. The complete renovation will cost an estimated US$59 million and involves the construction of a larger passenger terminal building, a new car park, access roads, and cargo operations facilities. Other planned improvements include the addition of runway lights, infrastructure for fire and rescue services, and air navigation and traffic control systems.

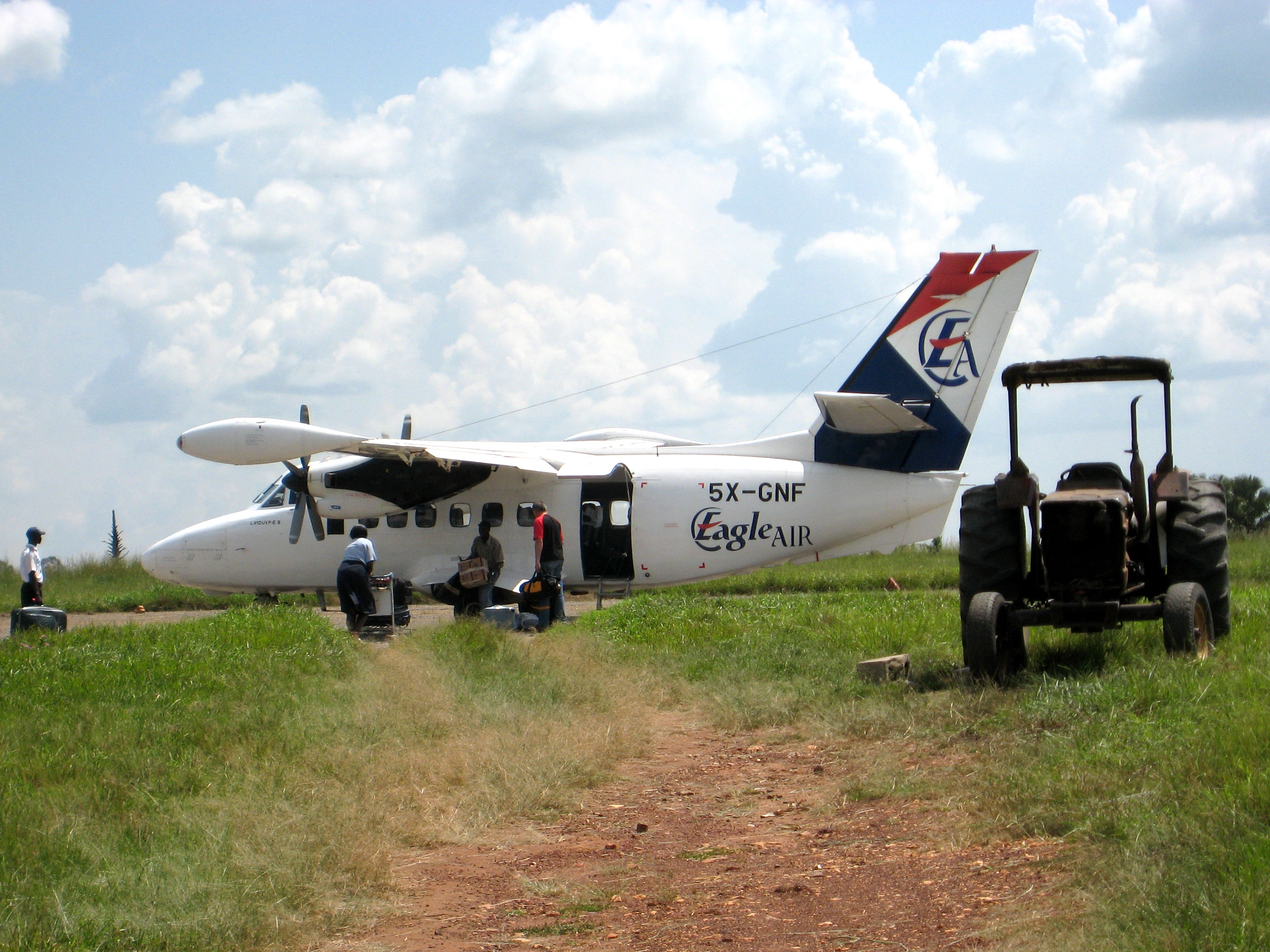
Eagle Air at Gulu Airfield in 2009

The Gulu non-directional beacon (Ident: GU) is located on the field.

== Airlines and destinations ==
Airlines offering scheduled passenger service:

Airlines	Destinations
Eagle Air	Entebbe

== See also ==
- Gulu District
- Transport in Uganda
- List of airports in Uganda
