= DAS Air Cargo =

Ugandan cargo airline

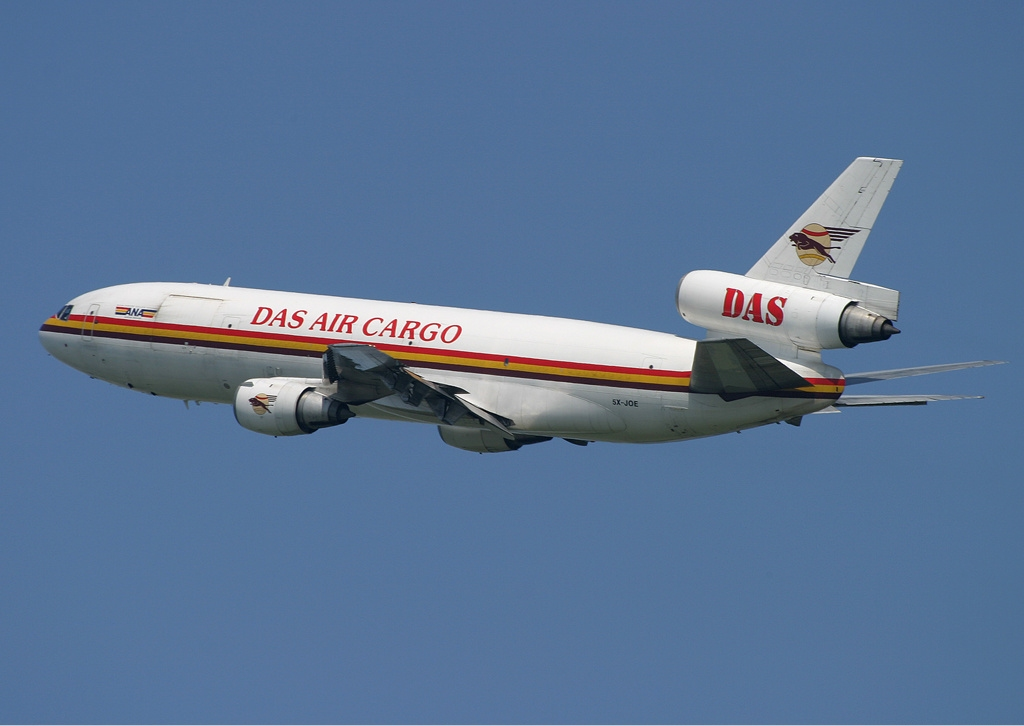
IATA	ICAO	Call sign
WD	DSR	DAIRAIR
- Founded: 1983
- Commenced operations: June 1983
- Ceased operations: 17 September 2007
- Hubs: Entebbe; London-Gatwick
- Secondary hubs: Dubai; Nairobi–Jomo Kenyatta; Lagos
- Subsidiaries: Royal Daisy Airlines
- Fleet size: 1
- Destinations: 15
- Headquarters: Entebbe, Uganda
- Key people: Joseph Roy (Chairman and CEO); Daisy Roy (Managing Director)
- Employees: 228 (at March 2007).
- Website: www.dasair.com

DAS Air Cargo was a Ugandan cargo airline based at Entebbe as Dairoo Air Services. It operated all-cargo services between Europe and 20 cities throughout Africa, the Middle East and the Far East. Entebbe was a major hub for business in east and southern Africa and also for flights from Bangkok which stage through Dubai. Its main bases were London Gatwick Airport and Entebbe International Airport, with hubs at Jomo Kenyatta International Airport, Nairobi, Dubai International Airport and Murtala Mohammed International Airport, Lagos. The European office was at Crawley, England

== History ==
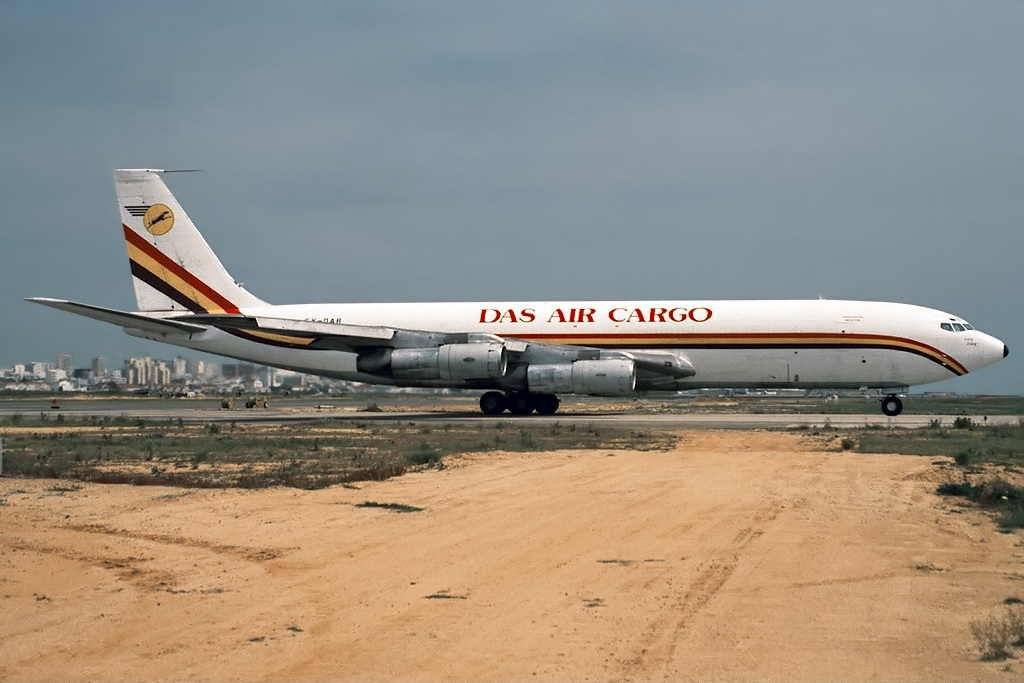
DAS Air Cargo 707-320C

The airline was established in 1983 in Ghana and started operations in June 1983. It initially provided ad hoc charters and wet-lease flying for established operators. In 1987 it began regular cargo services between London and Lagos and Entebbe. In 1990, the DAS Air Cargo USA division was opened to operate cargo operations there for the airline. The division was based in Miami, Florida, and shared its offices with DAS Air Cargo's main business partner, passenger charter airline First Choice Airways-another airline which later went bankrupt.

DAS Air Cargo also had an EASA 145 approved maintenance facility at Kent International Airport in the UK. The facility was used for maintenance on their own aircraft as well as those of World Airways, Gemini Air Cargo and Avient Aviation.

In 2006 DAS Air Cargo was banned from conducting flights within the European Union. On 6 March 2007, the European Commission, the EU's executive arm, removed DAS Air Cargo from its list of banned aircraft after they made safety improvements.

The company called in the administrators on 17 September 2007 and all flying stopped. Their aircraft were stored at Manston, England, which subsequently closed in 2015.

On 20 November 2007, it was announced on that Continental Aviation Services (Nigeria) Ltd bought all of the business and assets (including the sole remaining DC-10), however the liabilities remain with Das Air Ltd.

== Destinations ==
- Belgium - Brussels, Ostend
- China- Shanghai
- Finland Hensinki
- France - Bâle/Basel, Chalons-Vatry
- Ghana - Accra
- Hungary - Budapest
- Italy - Rome
- Malta - Luqa
- Serbia - Belgrade
- South Africa - Johannesburg
- United Kingdom - London-Gatwick, Manchester
- United Arab Emirates - Dubai, Sharajah

== Fleet ==
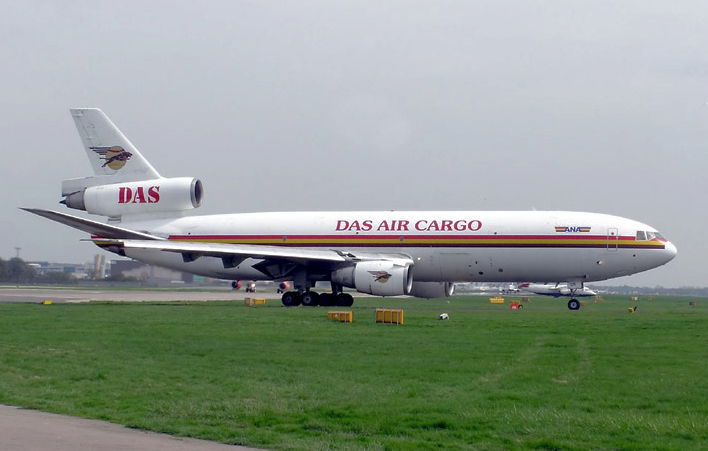
DAS Air Cargo DC-10

DAS Air Cargo consisted of the following aircraft:

President Airlines fleet
Aircraft	Total	Introduced	Retired	Notes
Boeing 707-320C	8	1984	2002	
McDonnell Douglas DC-10-30F	9	1995	2007	

== Accidents and incidents ==
- On 30 April 2000, a McDonnell Douglas DC-10-30F (registered N800WR) overshot the runway on landing at Entebbe International Airport and ditched at Lake Victoria, with the cockpit section broken apart. None of the 7 crew members were injured.

== See also ==
- List of defunct airlines of Uganda
