= Dei BioPharma =

Ugandan biotechnology and pharmaceutical company

Dei BioPharma Ltd
- Type: Private
- Industry: Biotechnology, Pharmaceuticals
- Founded: 2014
- Founder: Dr. Matthias Magoola
- Headquarters: Matugga, Kampala, Kampala, Uganda
- Key people: HITESH UPRETI (CEO)
- Products: Vaccines, insulin, oncology drugs, mRNA therapies, herbal medicines
- Website: deibiopharma.com

Dei BioPharma Ltd is a Ugandan biotechnology and pharmaceutical company headquartered in Matugga, Wakiso District. Founded in 2014 by Dr. Matthias Magoola, the company operates one of Africa’s largest vaccine and drug manufacturing facilities, aimed at enhancing healthcare self-sufficiency across the continent.

== History ==
Dei BioPharma was established in 2014 by Ugandan scientist and entrepreneur Dr. Matthias Magoola. Its flagship facility, situated on 150 acres in Matugga, was inaugurated in July 2021 by Ugandan President Yoweri Museveni and then Kenyan Deputy President William Ruto.

== Operations ==
The Matugga facility is equipped to manufacture a wide range of pharmaceutical products including vaccines, insulin, oncology drugs, and mRNA therapies. It has the capacity to produce up to one billion doses of mRNA vaccines annually and is designed to meet standards set by the US FDA, EMA, and WHO.

In May 2024, Uganda’s National Drug Authority (NDA) granted Dei BioPharma licenses to begin manufacturing essential medicines, including non-beta-lactam tablets and hard gelatin capsules.

The plant comprises multiple sections for biotech, generic, injectable, oncology, nutraceuticals, penicillin, cephalosporin, non-beta-lactam, and vaccine manufacturing. The generic section alone is capable of producing over 150 different drugs, beginning with an initial batch of 25 types.

== Research and innovation ==
In 2025, the company submitted an application to the U.S. Food and Drug Administration (FDA) for approval of a novel GLP-1 agonist targeting diabetes and weight loss, making it the first African firm to pursue FDA approval for such a drug.

Dei BioPharma also invests in traditional medicine, leveraging Uganda's biodiversity to develop herbal-based treatments, including a malaria remedy derived from local herbs.

== Government investment and oversight ==
Between 2020 and 2024, the Ugandan government invested approximately UGX 723.4 billion in Dei BioPharma through multiple budget allocations.

The investment sparked parliamentary scrutiny, with the Leader of the Opposition, Joel Ssenyonyi, questioning the absence of key documents such as a valuation by the Chief Government Valuer and a formal memorandum of understanding.

The Auditor General’s report further raised concerns about the lack of share certificates and valuation documentation.

In response to mounting questions, the company indicated a willingness to refund the investment, although no formal agreement had been reached as of late 2024.

== Recognition ==
In August 2024, Dei BioPharma was awarded "Best Pharma Company" at the African Excellence Awards hosted by MEA Markets in London.

Members of the Ugandan Parliament commended the company for pioneering drug development in underrepresented areas such as oncology and vaccine production.
