= Adjumani Airport =

Airport in Uganda

- IATA: none; ICAO: HUAJ

Summary
- Airport type: Public
- Owner: Adjumani Town Council
- Serves: Adjumani, Uganda
- Elevation AMSL: 2,611 ft / 796 m
- Coordinates: 3°20′20″N 31°45′50″E

Map
- Location of airport in Uganda

Runways
| Direction | Length | | Surface |
| Direction | m | ft | Surface |
|---|---|---|---|
| 09/27 | 1,210 | 3,970 | Gravel |
- Sources: GCM Google Maps

Adjumani Airport (ICAO: HUAJ) is an airport that serves the town of Adjumani in the Northern Region of Uganda, close to the international border with South Sudan. It is approximately 376 kilometres (234 mi) by air north of Entebbe International Airport, the country's largest civilian and military airport.

The well-marked runway is 5 kilometres (3.1 mi) southwest of the town. The runway length does not include a 400 metres (1,300 ft) overrun on the western end.

== See also ==
- Transport in Uganda
- List of airports in Uganda
