= List of airlines of Uganda =

This is a list of airlines currently operating in Uganda, as of 2020.

Airline	IATA	ICAO	Callsign	Photo	Founded	Notes
Aerolink Uganda	A8	XAU	PEARL		2012	Scheduled carrier
Air Serv Limited					1995	Passenger charter
BAR Aviation Uganda	HE				2008	Scheduled carrier, passenger charter
MAF Uganda					1987	Passenger charter
Eagle Air (Uganda)	H7	EGU	AFRICAN EAGLE		1994	Scheduled carrier
Uganda Air Cargo		UCC	UGANDA CARGO		1975	Cargo carrier
Uganda Airlines	UR	UGD	CRESTED		2018	Scheduled carrier
Kampala Executive Aviation					2008	Scheduled carrier, passenger charter
Premier Airlines					2025	Scheduled carrier
Kush Air					2024	Scheduled carrier

== See also ==
- List of defunct airlines in Uganda
- List of airports in Uganda
- List of companies based in Uganda
- Airlines of Africa
