= Uganda Reinsurance Company =

Ugandan reinsurance company

Coordinates: 00°19′59″N 32°36′02.5″E

- Company type: Private
- Industry: Reinsurance, Insurance
- Founded: 1 January 2000; 26 years ago
- Headquarters: Kampala, Uganda
- Key people: Twaha Kigongo Kaawaase; Chairperson of the Board; Ronnie Musoke; CEO
- Website: Homepage

Uganda Reinsurance Company Limited commonly referred to as Uganda Re is a reinsurance company based in Kampala, Uganda. As of July 2022, it was the only locally registered, licensed reinsurer in Uganda. The company is privately owned.

== Overview ==
Uganda Re is the oldest and among two locally registered Reinsurers in Uganda with Kenya Re. The company was established in 2000. It began commercial operations in 2013. Under current Uganda insurance laws, Uganda Re is guaranteed 15 percent re-insurance business generated within Uganda.

As of January 2020, there were four reinsurance companies operating in Uganda. These were (a) Zep Re (b) Africa Re (c) Kenya Re and (d) Uganda Re. The company undertakes reinsurance business from the African continent and the Indian Ocean Islands. Uganda Re reinsures both life and non-life insurance policies.

As of March 2023, Uganda Re's shareholders' capital was reported as US$4,142,000.

== Ownership ==
The shares of the stock of Uganda Reinsurance Company are privately owned. The table below illustrates the major shareholders in Uganda Re.

Uganda Reinsurance Company Stock Ownership
Rank	Name of Owner	Domicile	% Ownership
1	Zep Re	Kenya	21.0
2	Kenya Re	Kenya	11.0
3	Old Mutual Insurance Company	Kenya	9.0
4	Uganda Insurers Association	Uganda	8.0
5	Local Insurance Brokers	Uganda	5.6
6	Continental Reinsurance Company	Nigeria	5.0
7	Local Individuals	Uganda	1.5
7	Other Institutional Investors	Africa	38.9
	Total		100.0

== Governance ==
Uganda Re is governed by a seven-person board of directors, chaired by Twaha Kigongo Kaawaase. The company's chief executive officer is Ronnie Musoke.

== See also ==
- List of insurance companies in Uganda
- Insurance Regulatory Authority of Uganda
