= John Ssebaana Kizito =

Ugandan politician (1934–2017)

- Born: 12 September 1934; Mpande, Luweero District, Uganda
- Died: 3 July 2017 (aged 82); Nakasero Hospital, Kampala, Uganda
- Education: Makerere University (Bachelor of Arts); University of Oregon (Master of Arts)
- Occupations: Economist & politician
- Years active: 1962 – 2016

John Ssebaana Kizito (12 September 1934 – 3 July 2017) was a Ugandan businessman, economist and politician. He was the president of the Democratic Party (DP) in Uganda from 2005 to 2010. Kizito was a member of the University Council of Ndejje University. He was reported to be one of the wealthiest people in Uganda, having sizable holdings in real estate and insurance.

== Background and education ==
Ssebaana was born in Mpande Village, Luweero District, in Uganda's Central Region on 12 September 1934. He attended Kibuli Secondary School, Kings College Budo and was a graduate of Makerere University. In 1960, he graduated with a Master of Arts degree in economics from the University of Oregon in Eugene, Oregon in the U.S.

== Career ==
Kizito'a political career began before Uganda became an independent country. He was a civil servant and politician in several of Uganda's eras of tyranny and political turmoil, including under Idi Amin, Milton Obote, and President Yoweri Museveni's National Resistance Movement government.

In 1960, he served as a national executive officer. Upon returning from the U.S. in October 1962, he became an investment executive at the Uganda Development Corporation, the holding company that managed all government-owned enterprises.

After independence, he was a member of the East African Legislative Assembly, an arm of the East African Community, from 1967 until 1977. From 1977 until 1980, he served as the chairman of the National Insurance Corporation. In 1980, he was elected a member of parliament for the Kampala South Constituency, winning 90 percent of the vote. He was the shadow minister of foreign affairs between 1981 until 1985 and was acting leader of the opposition in 1983.

He was a member of the Constituent Assembly that wrote the 1995 Ugandan Constitution, representing the Makindye East Constituency. From 1994 to 1995, he served as chairman of the National Caucus of Democracy.

Between 1998 and 2006, he was twice elected mayor of Kampala, Uganda's capital city, replacing Nasser Sebaggala in 1999 and being replaced by Sebaggala in 2006.

In September 2006, Ssebaana participated in a political forum held during the Ugandan North American Association (UNAA) convention in New York City.

Kizito was the Democratic Party's unsuccessful candidate in the 2006 presidential election.

== Business ==
In 1982, John Ssebaana Kizito, together with a business associate, Joseph William Kiwanuka, established Uganda's first private (non-government) insurance company, Statewide Insurance Company (SWICO), for which Ssebaana served as Chairman of the Board and Kiwanuka serves as the Managing Director.

== Death ==
Ssebaana died on 3 July 2017 at Nakasero Hospital, in Kampala, where he was admitted two weeks prior, following a stroke.

== See also ==
- List of political parties in Uganda
- Statewide Insurance Company
- Politics of Uganda
- List of Insurance Companies in Uganda
- Ndejje University

Preceded by Paul Ssemogerere	President of the Democratic Party; 2005–2010	Succeeded by Norbert Mao

Preceded by Nasser Sebaggala	Mayor of Kampala; 1999–2006	Succeeded by Nasser Sebaggala
