= Okurut =

Okurut is a surname. Notable people with the surname include:

- Mary Karooro Okurut (1954–2025), Ugandan educator
- Stanislaus Okurut (?–2014), Ugandan politician
- Tom Okurut (1960–2024), Ugandan activist
