= Katumba Wamala =

Ugandan politician

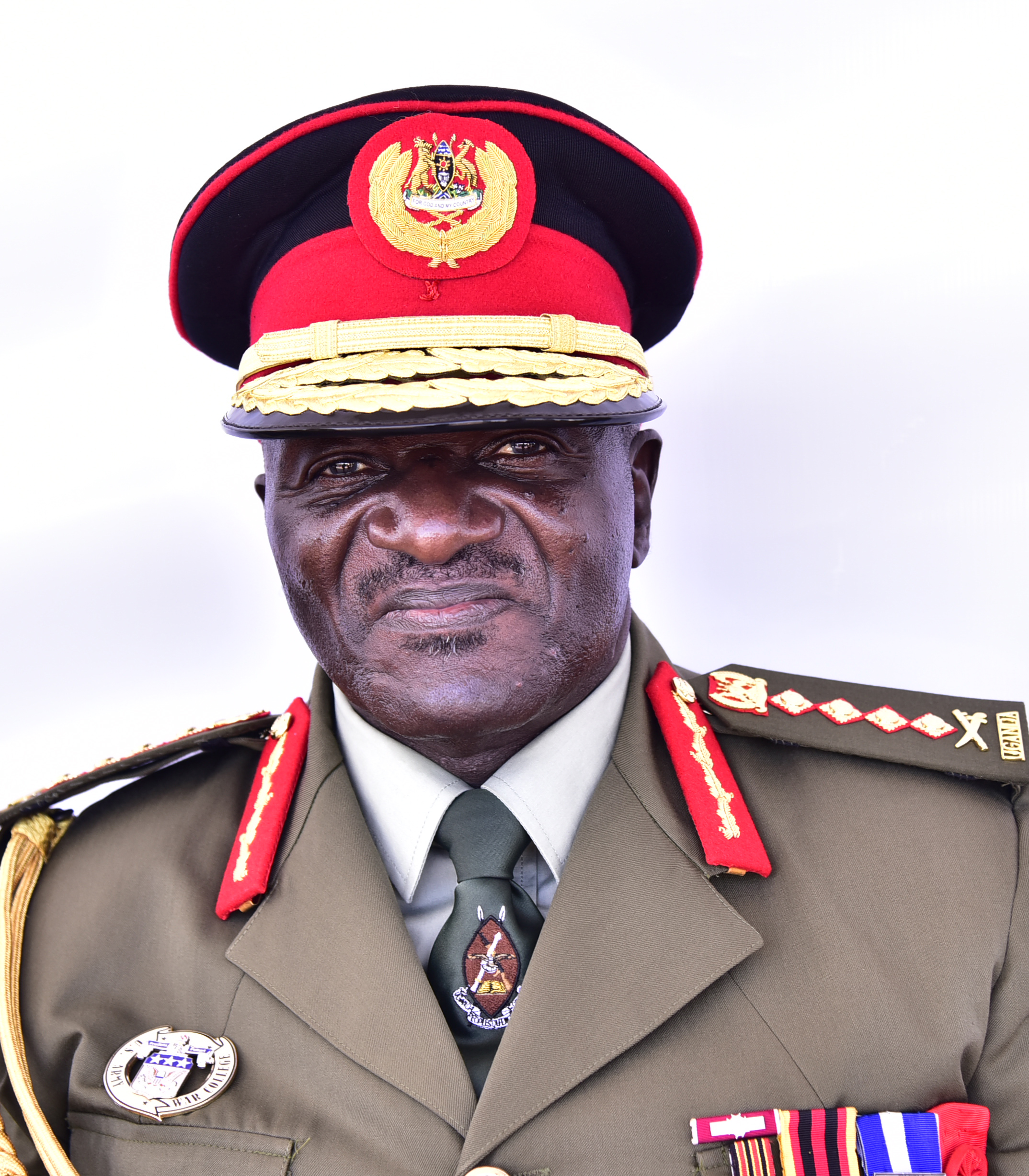
- Born: Edward Katumba Wamala; 19 November 1956 (age 69); Kalangala District, British Uganda
- Education: Nkumba University (Bachelor of Arts in international relations & diplomacy); Uganda Military Academy (Basic Officers Course); Tanzania Military Academy (Junior Staff College); Nigerian Command and Staff College (Senior Staff College); US Army Command and General Staff College (Strategic studies course)
- Military career
- Allegiance: UNLA (1980–1986); UPDF (1986–2026)
- Branch: Ugandan Land Forces
- Service years: 1980–present
- Rank: General
- Conflicts: Ugandan Bush War; War in Uganda (1986–1994); Operation Thunderbolt (1997); Lord's Resistance Army insurgency; South Sudanese Civil War

Edward Katumba Wamala (born 19 November 1956), commonly known as Katumba Wamala, is a retired Ugandan military officer and politician who serves as Minister of Public Service in the Ugandan cabinet, since 26 May 2026.

Prior to his current position, from 17 January 2017 until 14 December 2019, he served as Minister of State for Works in the Ugandan cabinet. He also served as the chief of staff of the Uganda People's Defense Force (UPDF), from 2013 until 2017, and was the commander of the UPDF's Land Forces from 2005 to 2013. He also served as the inspector general of police (IGP) of the Uganda Police Force (UPF), the highest rank in that branch of Uganda's government, from 2001 until 2005. Wamala was the first active UPDF soldier to serve as the head of the UPF. On 1 June 2021, Katumba survived an assassination attempt in Kisaasi, a Kampala suburb when gunmen attacked and wounded the General, killing his daughter and driver, leaving him with gunshot wounds on both shoulders.

== Early life and education. ==
Katumba Wamala was born on 19 November 1956 in Bweeza, a village which is nine miles from kalangala town, Kalangala District, Ssese Islands, in the Buganda Region of Uganda. He started school at Nakibizi primary school (On the way to Jinja). He also studied at St. James (Now a secondary school in Jinja ) and Bukomero where his sister was a teacher. He finally completed primary education at Kasubi Church of Uganda Primary School in Kampala where his brother and mother had relocated. At secondary level ,Katumba says he did not move much as he stetted at Old Kampala Secondary School l for six years.

At Kasubi Primary School, Katumba says, he learnt a lesson that has pushed him to greater heights. “I artfully asked a teacher for permission to go and answer nature's call. Little did the teacher know that i wanted to get a quiet place to read a novel, only to be caught by the headmaster Mr Wakatamba. I deceived him that i had got permission from the teacher but of course after cross-checking and discovering that i was lying, he took me to his office, made me lie on the long table and then gave me five hot strokes of the cane, for doing the right thing at the wrong time and wrong place’,” says Katumba .

“That virtue has stuck in me up to today, because even when I was made IGP, I went to visit Mr Wakatamba – the headmaster and appreciate him but met him in a situation where he could not recognise me”.

He holds a certificate in agriculture. In 2007, he graduated from Nkumba University with a Bachelor of Arts degree in international relations and diplomacy. He also holds a Master of Science degree in strategic leadership from the United States Army War College. He has military qualifications from the following military schools: Uganda Military Academy, Tanzania Military Academy, a military academy in the Soviet Union, Nigerian Command and Staff College, United States Army Command and General Staff College, and United States Army War College. In October 2023, he was awarded an honorary Doctor of Letters by Nkumba University in recognition of his contributions to his community, country and humanity.

== Career ==
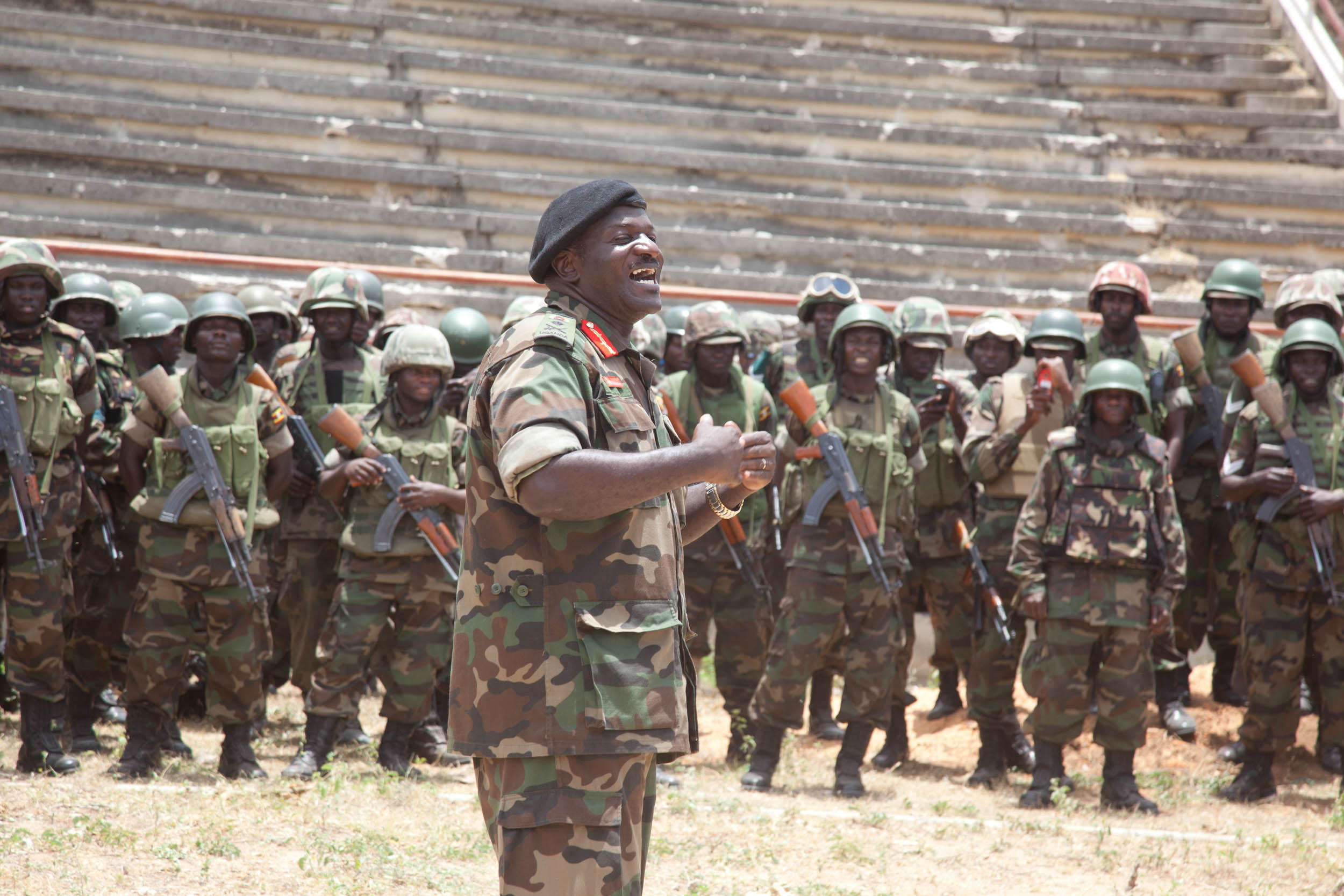
General Edward Katumba Wamala

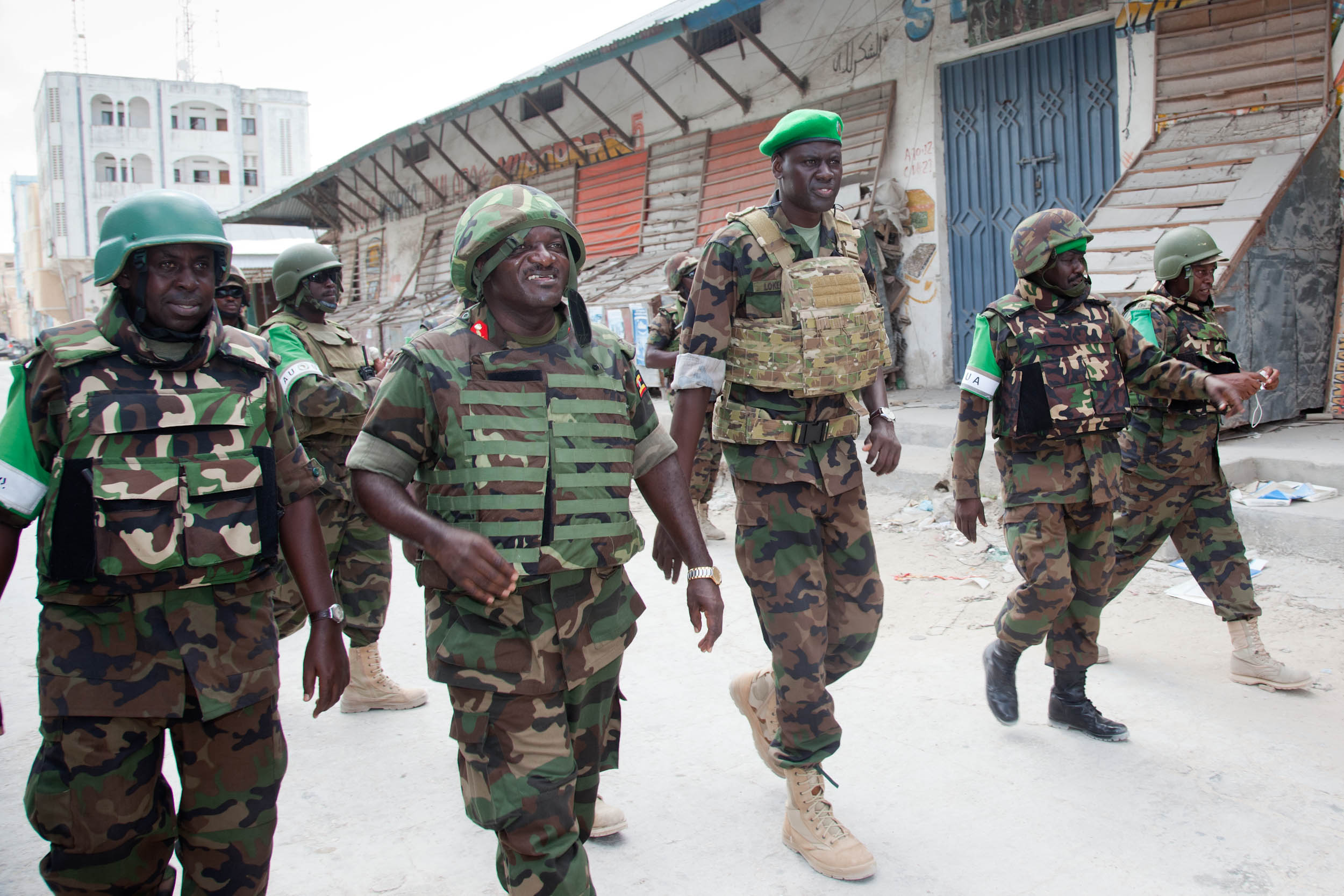
Commander of UPDF Land Forces Lieutenant General Edward Katumba Wamala in Mogadishu

Wamala was an officer in the Uganda National Liberation Army (UNLA) when the National Resistance Army (NRA) defeated the UNLA in 1986. He transitioned into the NRA without incident.

Between 1999 and 2000, he was a student at the U.S. Army War College in Carlisle, Pennsylvania. Between 2000 and 2001, at the rank of major general, he commanded the UPDF forces in the Democratic Republic of the Congo. He was appointed IGP in 2001, serving in that capacity until 2005.

In August 2003, Katumba attended the Ugandan North American Association (UNAA) convention in Boston, Massachusetts.

He was then promoted to lieutenant general and given the title of commander of land forces, based at Bombo Military Barracks, making him one of the most senior officers in the Ugandan military. In his role as commander of the land forces, he was closely engaged in the peace-keeping mission that the UPDF performs in Somalia, commonly referred to as AMISOM. On 23 May 2013, he was promoted to the rank of four-star general and appointed chief of defence forces.

== Assassination attempt. ==
On 1 June 2021, General Katumba Wamala was travelling to the city centre when four gunmen appeared and opened fire on his vehicle, in Kisaasi, a Kampala suburb. Wamala suffered gunshot wounds to both shoulders, but survived and was rushed to hospital. His daughter, Brenda Wamala Nantongo, and his driver, Haruna Kayondo, were killed at the scene of the attack. All of his surviving family members attended the funeral of Brenda Wamala Nantongo. After a month of investigation, on 1 July 2021, authorities revealed that the attackers were Islamist extremists who were trained at a jihadist camp in North Kivu, Democratic Republic of Congo, and had links with the Allied Democratic Forces and the Islamic State.

The President of Uganda, Yoweri Museveni, condemned the attack, describing it as the work of "pigs who do not value life".

== Retirement from the UPDF ==
As of August 2026, after 47 consecutive years of national military service, General Edward Katumba Wamala is scheduled to retire from the Uganda People's Defence Force (UPDF), later in the year. He continues to serve as a cabinent minister in Uganda's cabinet.

Police appointments
Preceded by John Kisembo	Inspector General of Police of Uganda Police Force; 2003–2005	Succeeded by Kale Kayihura
Military offices
Preceded by Aronda Nyakairima	Chief of Defense Forces of Uganda; 2013 – 2017	Succeeded by David Muhoozi
Civic offices
Preceded by Monica Azuba Ntege	Minister of Works and Transport; December 2019 - May 2026	Succeeded by Fred Byamukama
Preceded by Wilson Muruli Mukasa	Minister of Public Service; May 2026 - present	Succeeded by Incumbent
