= Road signs in Uganda =

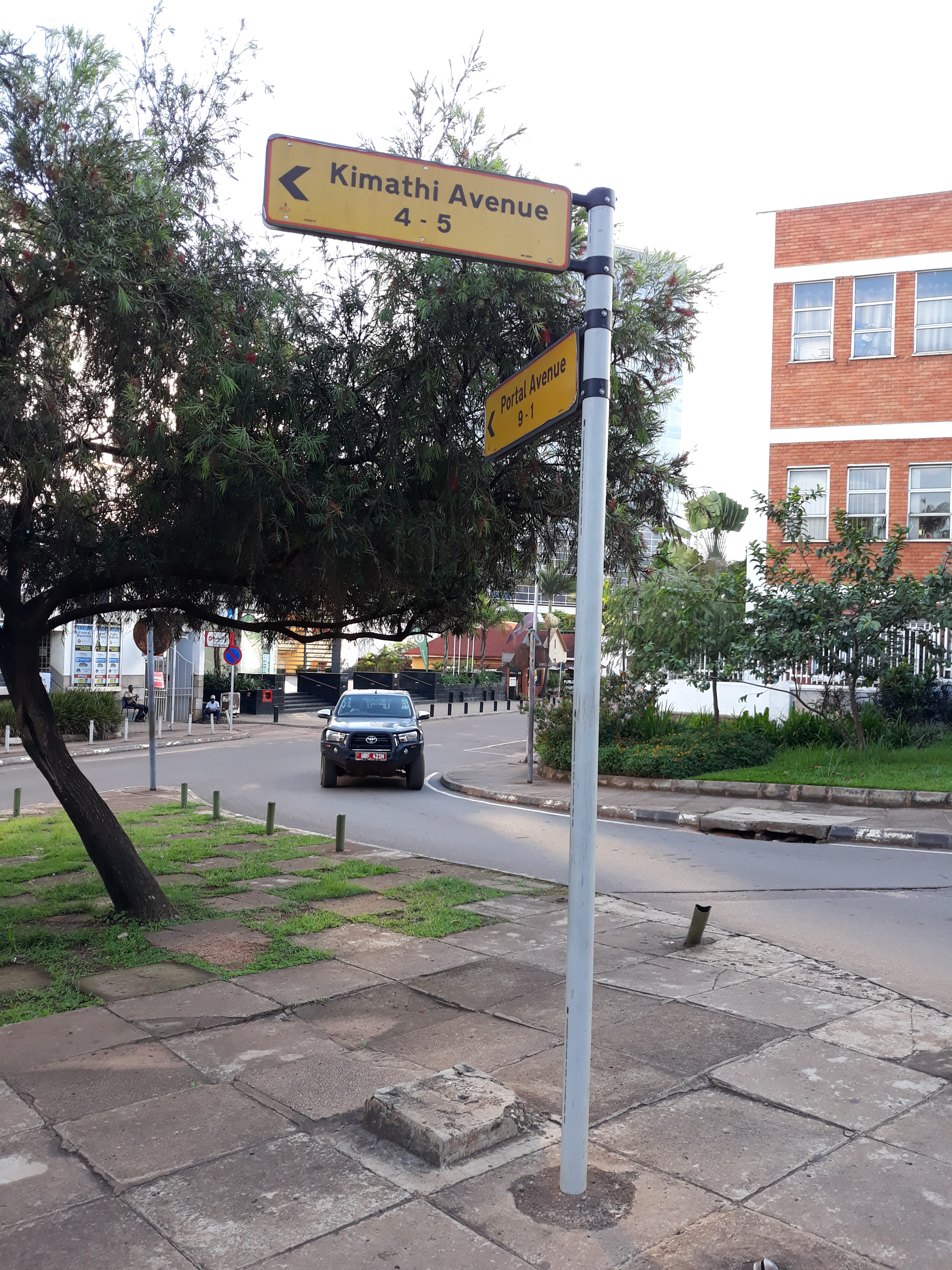
A road sign showing names for two streets

Road signs in Uganda are regulated in the Traffic Signs Manual and governed by the Ministry of Works and Transport (formerly the Ministry of Works, Housing and Communications). They closely resemble road signs used in the United Kingdom since Uganda was a British colony until 1962, with the exception that Uganda uses metric system units instead of the Imperial System of units (miles and yards).

Road signs in Uganda generally use the same pattern of colors, shapes, and symbols set out in the Vienna Convention on Road Signs and Signals, which are also used in most countries of Europe and Africa (except Ireland and Liberia which they both use diamond MUTCD warning signs instead of triangular). Partner states of the East African Community take measures to ratify or accede to international conventions on road traffic and road signs and signals. On August 23, 2022, Uganda acceded to the Convention. Other partner states of the East African Community such as Burundi, Kenya, Rwanda, South Sudan and Tanzania have yet to ratify or accede to the Convention. Uganda drives on the left.

== Warning signs ==
=== Permanent warning signs ===
Hairpin curve

Hairpin curve

Crossroad

Side road

Side road

T-intersection

Y-intersection

Staggered intersection

Staggered intersection

Roundabout ahead

Traffic signals ahead

Two-way traffic

Other danger

Height restriction

Uneven road

Hump ahead

Drift

Narrow bridge

Loose gravel

Slippery road

Falling rocks on left

Falling rocks on right

Steep descent

Steep ascent

Quay or river bank

Low flying aircraft

Crosswinds

Railway crossing with gate or barrier

Railway crossing without gate or barrier

Pedestrian crossing ahead

Pedestrians

Children

Agricultural vehicles

Wild animals

=== Hazard marker signs ===
Long chevron

Long chevron

Short chevron

Short chevron

T-intersection chevron

Roadside hazard plate

Roadside hazard plate

Roadway hazard plate

=== Temporary warning signs ===
Hairpin curve

Roadworks

Barricade (no entry)

Traffic control ahead

== Regulatory signs ==
=== Prohibitory signs ===
No entry

No motor vehicles

No motor vehicles except motorcycles

No trucks

No buses

No motorcycles

No tractors or slow-moving vehicles

No bicycles

No pedestrians

No animal-drawn vehicles

Length limit

Height limit

Width limit

Gross weight limit

Axle weight limit

No left turn

No right turn

No U-turns

No overtaking

No overtaking by goods vehicles

No parking or waiting

No stopping or standing

Speed limit (30 km/h)

Speed limit (50 km/h)

Speed limit (80 km/h)

End of speed limit (50 km/h)

End of speed limit (80 km/h)

=== Priority signs ===
Stop

Give way

Temporary traffic control - STOP

Temporary traffic control - GO

=== Mandatory signs ===
Go straight ahead

Turn left

Turn right

Turn left ahead

Turn right ahead

Go straight or turn left

Go straight or turn right

Pass on the left

Pass on the right

Pass either side

Roundabout

Buses only

Bicycles only

Pedestrians only

== Guidance signs ==
Map-type advance direction sign - roundabout - Primary roads.

Map-type advance direction sign - roundabout – Other roads.

Map-type advance direction sign - crossroad - Primary roads.

Map-type advance direction sign - crossroad – Other roads.

Map-type advance direction sign – T-intersection - Primary roads.

Map-type advance direction sign – T-intersection – Other roads.

Stack-type advance direction sign - Primary roads.

Stack-type advance direction sign - Other roads.

Lane pre-selection sign - Primary roads.

Lane pre-selection sign - Other roads.

Direction sign - Primary roads

Direction sign - Other roads

Confirmatory sign - Primary roads

Confirmatory sign - Other roads

Place identification sign, entry

Place identification sign, exit

Diversion ahead

Diverted traffic

== Information signs ==
Pedestrian crossing

Hump

No through road

Parking

Bus stop

Prioirity over oncoming vehicles

One-way traffic on left

One-way traffic on right

One-way traffic

Police control

Start of extra lane

End of extra lane

Hospital

First aid

Telephone

Information

Filling station

Workshop

Refreshments

Restaurant

Hotel

Rest area

Camp site

Airport

== Supplementary plates ==
Distance to hazard or regulation

Extension of hazard or regulation

Direction in which message applies

Direction in which message applies

Vehicle category for which message applies – bus

Vehicle category for which message applies – truck

Vehicle category for which message applies – car

Vehicle category for which message applies – motorcycle

Variable text message – one line
