= List of insurance companies in Uganda =

This is a list of insurance companies in Uganda regulated by the Insurance Regulatory Authority of Uganda:

== Non-life insurance companies ==
1. Alliance Africa General Insurance Limited
2. Britam Insurance Uganda Limited
3. CIC General Insurance Uganda Limited
4. East African Underwriters Limited
5. GoldStar Life Assurance Company Limited
6. NIC General Insurance Company Limited
7. Statewide Insurance Company Limited
8. The Jubilee Insurance Company of Uganda
9. TransAfrica Assurance Limited
10. Old Mutual Insurance Uganda Limited

== Life insurance companies ==
1. Prudential Assurance Uganda Limited (Acquired Goldstar Insurance in June 2015)
2. The Jubilee Life Insurance Company of Uganda
3. Liberty Life Assurance Company Limited
4. NIC Life Assurance Company Limited
5. Sanlam Life Insurance Company Limited
6. Old Mutual Assurance Uganda Limited
7. CIC Africa Life Assurance Limited
8. OLEA Uganda Limited (formerly Ballpack Insurance Group Limited)
9. Britam Life Assurance Company (Uganda) Limited

== Re-insurance companies ==
1. PTA Reinsurance Corporation
2. Africa Reinsurance Corporation
3. Uganda Reinsurance Company
4. Kenya Reinsurance Corporation Uganda

== See also ==
- Banking in Uganda
- Insurance Regulatory Authority of Uganda
- List of companies based in Uganda
