= Global Trust Bank =

Global Trust Bank may refer to the following defunct banks:

- Global Trust Bank (India)
- Global Trust Bank (Uganda)
