= Zam Seera =

Ugandan netballer

Personal information
- Full name: Zam Seera
- Nationality: Ugandan

Netball career
- Playing position: Wing Defence (WD)
Years	Club team	Apps
2017–present	National Insurance Corporation Netball Club (NIC)	
Years	National team	Caps
2017	Uganda U-21 (She Pearls)	

Zam Seera is a Ugandan netballer who plays for National Insurance Corporation Netball Club (NIC Netball Club). She plays a Wing defender and a shooter.

== Netball career ==
Seera took part in the win by NIC Netball Club (55) over Prison Netball Club (44) in 2025 during the National Netball League. She participated in the win of NIC Netball Club over Zimamoto during the 2024 East African Club Championships. Seera of NIC Netball Club with 384 goals was third during the Netball Super League in 2022.

She participated in the Uganda U-21 (She Pearls) during the World Youth Netball Cup where Uganda scored 55 and Scotland scored 45 making Uganda to finish in the seventh overall position. This competition took place in Gaborone, Botswana in 2017.
