= ZEP-RE =

ZEP-RE (PTA Reinsurance Company)
- Founded: November 23, 1990; 34 years ago
- Headquarters: Nairobi, Kenya

ZEP-RE (PTA Reinsurance Company) is a specialised institution of the Common Market for Eastern and Southern Africa (COMESA) created under charter. The Company is currently headquartered in Nairobi, Kenya.

== Overview ==
ZEP-RE (PTA Reinsurance Company) is an institution of the Common Market for Eastern and Southern Africa (COMESA), established by an Agreement signed by Heads of States and Governments on 23 November 1990 in Mbabane, Swaziland. The signatory Member States to the Agreement establishing the Company include: Angola, Burundi, Comoros, Democratic Republic of Congo, Djibouti, Eritrea, Ethiopia, Kenya, Lesotho, Madagascar, Malawi, Mauritius, Mozambique, Rwanda, Somali, Sudan, Tanzania, Uganda, Zambia and Zimbabwe. As a result of the multinational agreement the company was formed in 1992.

The key objectives of the company as outlined in its charter include fostering the development of the insurance and reinsurance industry in the COMESA sub-region, promotion of the growth of national, sub-regional and regional underwriting and retention capacities and supporting sub-regional economic development.

== Credit rating ==
ZEP-RE is rated of B++ (Financial Strength Rating) and ‘bbb’ (Long-Term Issuer Credit Rating) by A.M. Best. The Company also holds a claim paying ability rating of AA+ with the Global Credit Rating (GCR) agency of South Africa.

== Shareholders ==
As of December 2016, ZEP-RE has 36 shareholders composed of COMESA member states and institutional shareholders

- Government of Djibouti
- Government of Kenya
- Government of Mauritius
- Government of Rwanda
- Government of Sudan
- Government of Zambia
- AfDB
- DEG
- GXA
- SOCABU
- Assurances BICOR
- Kenya-Re
- Blue Shield Insurance Company
- Mayfair Insurance Company Ltd.
- Apollo Insurance Company Ltd.
- EMOSE
- SONARWA
- SORAS
- United Insurance Company Ltd. (Sudan)
- Sheikan Ins. & Reins. Ltd
- Juba Insurance Company Ltd
- National Insurance Corporation Ltd. (Tanzania)
- Zanzibar Insurance Corporation
- PPF
- National Insurance Corporation Ltd. (Uganda)
- Lion Assurance of Uganda Ltd.
- Statewide Insurance Company Ltd
- Zambia State Insurance Corporation Ltd.
- Zambia State Insurance Corporation – Pension Trust
- COMESA Secretariat
- TDB
- Baobab Reinsurance Company Ltd.
- CMAR (NY Havana)
- SONAS
- National Insurance Corporate of Eritrea S.C.
- Amerga

== Locations ==
ZEP-RE is headquartered in Nairobi, Kenya with regional and operates hubs and country offices in Cameroon, Cote d’Ivoire, Ethiopia, Democratic Republic of Congo, Uganda, Zambia, Zimbabwe and Sudan. It enjoys mandatory concessions that grant it at least 10 percent of the reinsurance business in several countries.

== See also ==
- Trade and Development Bank
