= James Zikusoka =

Ugandan politician

Engineer James Zikusoka
- Born: James Dhikusooka; 11 November 1926; Namungalwe, Iganga District, Uganda
- Died: 29 January 2012 (aged 85); Nakasero Hospital, Kampala, Uganda
- Education: Imperial College of Science, Technology and Medicine
- Occupations: Engineer, politician
- Years active: 1956–2012
- Title: Former Cabinet Minister of Works and Transport

James Mbuzi Nyonyintono Zikusoka (11 November 1926 – 29 January 2012) was a Ugandan civil engineer, who served as the Cabinet Minister of Works and Transport from 1971 until 1972.

== Background and education ==
Zikusoka was born on 11 November 1926, in present-day Iganga District, Busoga sub-region, in the Eastern Region of Uganda. He attended local primary schools before he entered Busoga College Mwiri, where he completed his O-Level and A-Level education, graduating in 1947. He served as a prefect at the all-boys boarding school. Later he trained as a civil engineer.

== Engineering career ==
After his training as an engineer, Zikusoka was hired as the town engineer for Jinja Town, the first African to serve in that position. He was part of the team that designed the roads and streets in the town. In honor of his service to the town, a road, Engineer Zikusoka Road, was named after him, by Jinja Municipal Council. By 1969, he had risen to the position of Permanent Secretary in the Ministry of Works in the government of Uganda.

== Political career ==
In 1971, when Idi Amin overthrew the first government of Milton Obote, he named James Zikusoka as the Minister of Works, Communications and Housing in his first cabinet. However, when forces aligned to Milton Obote launched a botched attempt to overthrow Idi Amin, the dictator fired all cabinet ministers that he did not trust, Zikusoka included. Zikusoka sought political refugee in Kenya, and then later joined the United Nations Development Program and served as a consultant in New York City and Saudi Arabia, then for the Commonwealth Secretariat in Barbados until Amin was overthrown in 1979. He served as Uganda's high commissioner to the United Kingdom, appointed to that position by Godfrey Binaisa, the then newly appointed President of Uganda in 1979. Later, from 1993 until 1997, Zikusoka served as the chairman of the Public Service Commission.

== Religious career ==
In 1988, Zikisoka was ordained a deacon in Christ the King Cathedral at Bugembe. The following year, he was elected as reverend, canon and dean of the cathedral. He also helped with civil repairs to the physical building and purchased and financed the installation of a church organ out of his own pocket.

== Death ==
Zikusoka died on 29 January 2012, at Nakasero Hospital, in the country's capital, Kampala. He was interned at his ancestral home at Namungalwe, in Iganga District. He was survived by a widow and six of his seven children.

== See also ==
- Martin Aliker
- Monica Azuba Ntege
