= Uganda at the 2026 Commonwealth Games =

- Flag of Uganda
- CG code: UGA
- CGA: Commonwealth Games Association Uganda
- Website: nocuganda.org

in Glasgow, Scotland 23 July 2026 – 2 August 2026
- Competitors: 57 in 8 sports
- Flag bearer: Mary Cholhok Nuba
- Baton bearer: Dennis Mbaziira
- Medals Ranked 27th: Gold 0 Silver 2 Bronze 1 Total 3

Commonwealth Games appearances (overview)
- 1954; 1958; 1962; 1966; 1970; 1974; 1978; 1982; 1986; 1990; 1994; 1998; 2002; 2006; 2010; 2014; 2018; 2022; 2026; 2030

Uganda competed at the 2026 Commonwealth Games in Glasgow, Scotland. This marked Uganda's 17th participation at the games, after making its debut at the 1954 Commonwealth Games.

The Ugandan team named before the games consisted of 55 athletes. However, the final team consisted of 57 athletes (24 men and 33 women) competing in eight sports.

Netball athlete Mary Cholhok Nuba was the country's flagbearer during the opening ceremony. Meanwhile, para powerlifter Dennis Mbaziira was the baton bearer during the opening ceremony.

The Ugandan team won three medals (two silver and one bronze). This ranked the country 27th on the medal table.

== Competitors ==
The following is the list of number of competitors participating at the Games per sport/discipline.

Sport		Men	Women	Total
3x3 basketball		0	4	4
Athletics		11	8	19
Boxing		4	2	6
Judo		1	1	2
Netball		0	12	12
Swimming	Swimming	4	3	7
Swimming	Para swimming	1	1	2
Track cycling		1	0	1
Weightlifting	Para powerlifting	1	2	3
Weightlifting	Weightlifting	1	0	1
Total		24	33	57

== Medallists ==
The following Ugandan competitors won medals at the games. In the by discipline sections below, medallists' names are bolded.

Medal	Name	Sport	Event	Date	Ref.
Silver	Husnah Kukundakwe	Swimming	Women's 100 m breaststroke SB8	27 July	
Silver	Melissa Akullu; Jane Asinde; Jamila Nansikombi; Perus Nyamwenge	3x3 basketball	Women's tournament	29 July	
Bronze	Peruth Chemutai	Athletics	Women's 3000 m steeplechase	29 July	

== 3x3 basketball ==
Uganda's women's 3x3 basketball teams achieved qualification through the World rankings.

Summary

Team	Event	Group stage						Play-ins	Semifinal	Final / BM / CM	
Team	Event	Opposition Score	Opposition Score	Opposition Score	Opposition Score	Opposition Score	Rank	Opposition Score	Opposition Score	Opposition Score	Rank
**Uganda women**	Women's tournament	Jamaica; **W** 18–17 (OT)	Cayman Islands; **W** 21–7	Kenya; **W** 21–5	Fiji; **W** 21–8	Australia; **L** 9–21	2 **q**	Tonga; **W** 21–12	New Zealand; **W** 21–9	Australia; **L** 11–21	2nd place, silver medalist(s)

=== Women's tournament ===
Roster Uganda's roster consisted of four athletes.

- **Melissa Akullu**
- **Jane Asinde**
- **Jamila Nansikombi**
- **Peres Nyamwenge**

Group play

Pos	Team	Pld	W	L	PF	PA	PD	Qualification
1	Australia	5	5	0	105	33	+72	Direct to semi-finals
2	Uganda	5	4	1	90	58	+32	Quarter-finals
3	Jamaica	5	3	2	89	75	+14	Quarter-finals
4	Kenya	5	2	3	63	85	−22	
5	Fiji	5	1	4	56	81	−25	
6	Cayman Islands	5	0	5	29	100	−71	

Source: Glasgow 2026
Rules for classification: 1) Wins; 2) Head-to-head record; 3) Points scored.

24 July 2026
12:55

Report

**Uganda**	**18**–17 (OT)	Jamaica
Pts: Asinde 7		Pts: Brown 6

SEC, Glasgow

24 July 2026
15:20

Report

**Uganda**	**21**–7	Cayman Islands
Pts: Akullu 10		Pts: O'Connor 6

SEC, Glasgow

24 July 2026
20:15

Report

**Uganda**	**21**–5	Kenya
Pts: Asinde 10		Pts: Omondi 3

SEC, Glasgow

26 July 2026
13:35

Report

**Uganda**	**21**–8	Fiji
Pts: three players 7		Pts: Tuisue 5

SEC, Glasgow

26 July 2026
20:45

Report

**Australia**	**21**–9	Uganda
Pts: Atwell 11		Pts: Akullu 4

SEC, Glasgow

Play-ins

28 July 2026
19:30

Report

**Uganda**	**21**–12	Tonga
Pts: Asinde 10		Pts: three players 4

SEC, Glasgow

Semifinal

29 July 2026
14:00

Report

New Zealand	9–**21**	**Uganda**
Pts: Pupuke-Robati 5		Pts: Akullu, Asinde 8

SEC, Glasgow

Gold medal match

29 July 2026
20:00

Report

Uganda	11–**21**	**Australia**
Pts: Akullu 7		Pts: Whittle 15

SEC, Glasgow

== Athletics ==
Uganda entered 19 traack and field athletes, 11 men and eight women. Harbert Kibet and Kenneth Omuka was named to the team but did not compete in any events.

Key

Ranks given for track events are within the athlete's heat only.

- **Q** = Qualified for the next round
- **q** = Qualified for the next round as a fastest loser or, in field events, by position without achieving the qualifying target

Men
Track

Athlete	Event	Heat		Semifinal		Final	
Athlete	Event	Result	Rank	Result	Rank	Result	Rank
Adoli Haron	400 m	47.27	4	Did not advance			
Erick Okwii	400 m	47.91	5	Did not advance			
Domenic Krop	Mile	4:07.63	10	—N/a		Did not advance	
Silas Chemutai	Mile	3:57.32	7	—N/a		Did not advance	
Oscar Chelimo	5000 m	—N/a				DNS	
Dan Kibet	5000 m	—N/a				13:33.93	12
Keneth Kiprop	5000 m	—N/a				13:25.70	5
Oscar Chelimo	10,000 m	—N/a				28:10.49	12
Samuel Simba Cherop	10,000 m	—N/a				27:56.68	7
Dan Kibet	10,000 m	—N/a				28:05.84	11

Field

Athlete	Event	Qualification		Final	
Athlete	Event	Distance	Rank	Distance	Rank
David Berkham Otim	Long jump	7.09	17	Did not advance	

Women

Athlete	Event	Heat		Semifinal		Final	
Athlete	Event	Result	Rank	Result	Rank	Result	Rank
Mauren Banura	400 m	55.46	5 **q**	57.91	8	Did not advance	
Leni Shida	400 m	55.01	7 **q**	55.85	8	Did not advance	
Halimah Nakaayi	800 m	2:04.33	3 **Q**	2:03.36	6	Did not advance	
Maureen Chebet	Mile	5:09.81	10	—N/a		Did not advance	
Esther Chebet	5000 m	—N/a				14:50.70	4
Rebecca Chelangat	5000 m	—N/a				15:07.20	12
Joy Cheptoek	5000 m	—N/a				15:00.97	10
Esther Chebet	10,000 m	—N/a				31:55.70	4
Rebecca Chelangat	10,000 m	—N/a				32:16.28	8
Joy Cheptoek	10,000 m	—N/a				32:01.92	6
**Peruth Chemutai**	3000 m steeplechase	—N/a				9:09.96	3rd place, bronze medalist(s)

Mixed

Athlete	Event	Heat		Final	
Athlete	Event	Result	Rank	Result	Rank
Haron Adoli; Erick Okwii; Mauren Banura; Leni Shida	4 x 400 relay	3:23.47	5	Did not advance	

== Boxing ==
Uganda entered six boxers (four men and two women). After the games, four boxers disappeared and did not return to Uganda.

Athlete	Event	Round of 32	Round of 16	Quarterfinals	Semifinals	Final	
Athlete	Event	Opposition Result	Opposition Result	Opposition Result	Opposition Result	Opposition Result	Rank
Ibrahim Kemis	Men's 60 kg	Ngulube (ZAM); **L** 0–5	Did not advance				
Nuhu Batte	Men's 65 kg	Abdulwahab (NGR); **W** 5–0	Yadav (IND); **W** 3–2	Mughalzai (ENG); **L** 0–3	Did not advance		
Alfred Ojok	Men's 80 kg	Anitelea-Launiu (NIU); **W** 5–0	Shittu (ENG); **L** 0–5	Did not advance			
Aziz Abdul	Men's +90 kg	—N/a		Thomas (ENG); **L** DSQ	Did not advance		
Angel Katushabe	Women's 51 kg	—N/a	Bye	White (ENG); **L** 0–5	Did not advance		
Emily Nakalema	Women's 65 kg	—N/a		Bryson (AUS); **L** 1–4	Did not advance		

== Judo ==
Uganda entered two judoka (one man and one woman).

Athlete	Event	Round of 16	Quarterfinals	Semifinals	Repechage	Final/BM	
Athlete	Event	Opposition Result	Opposition Result	Opposition Result	Opposition Result	Opposition Result	Rank
Charles Mwangushya	Men's 100 kg	Ceesay (GAM); **L** 000–100	Did not advance				
Zubida Talikaza	Women's 70 kg	Thibault (CAN); **L** 000s1–001s1	Did not advance				

== Netball ==
Uganda qualified as one of the top 11 eligible teams in the World Netball Rankings as of September 1, 2025.

Summary

Team	Event	Group stage						Semifinal	Final / BM / Cl.	
Team	Event	Opposition Result	Opposition Result	Opposition Result	Opposition Result	Opposition Result	Rank	Opposition Result	Opposition Result	Rank
Uganda national team	Women's tournament	Wales; **W** 59–50	Trinidad and Tobago; **W** 80–36	Jamaica; **L** 49–55	New Zealand; **L** 50–58	Scotland; **W** 65–56	3	Did not advance	Fifth place match South Africa; **L** 54–62	6

Roster
Uganda's roster consisted of 12 athletes.

- Lillian Achola
- Gloria Ayaa
- Margret Baagala
- Mercy Batamuliza
- Mary Cholhok
- Muhameed Haniisha
- Alice Isoto
- Nasiimu Mutesi
- Shaffie Nalwanja
- Racheal Nanyonga
- Shadiah Nassanga
- Joan Ryekoboth

Group stage

Pos	Team	Pld	W	D	L	GF	GA	GD	Pts	Qualification
1	New Zealand	5	5	0	0	333	202	+131	10	Semi-finals
2	Jamaica	5	4	0	1	303	195	+108	8	Semi-finals
3	Uganda	5	3	0	2	303	255	+48	6	Classification matches
4	Scotland	5	2	0	3	276	258	+18	4	Classification matches
5	Wales	5	1	0	4	236	284	−48	2	Classification matches
6	Trinidad and Tobago	5	0	0	5	138	395	−257	0	Classification matches

Source: Glasgow 2026

25 July 2026; 16:00	Report	Wales	50–**59**	**Uganda**	OVO Hydro; Umpires: Gary Burgess, Ken Metekingi; Reserve umpire: Tania Fink
25 July 2026; 16:00	Report	Scoring by quarter: 13–**15**, **18**–13, **8**–17, 11–**14**			OVO Hydro; Umpires: Gary Burgess, Ken Metekingi; Reserve umpire: Tania Fink
25 July 2026; 16:00	Report	Georgia Rowe 30/30 (100%); Phillipa Yarranton 16/17 (94%); Zoe Matthewman 4/5 (80%)		Shadiah Nassanga 27/27 (100%); Mary Cholhok 23/25 (92%); Alice Isoto 9/9 (100%)	OVO Hydro; Umpires: Gary Burgess, Ken Metekingi; Reserve umpire: Tania Fink

26 July 2026; 19:00	Report	**Uganda**	**80**–36	Trinidad and Tobago	OVO Hydro; Umpires: Tracy-Ann Griffiths, Ken Metekingi; Reserve umpire: Gary Burgess
26 July 2026; 19:00	Report	Scoring by quarter: **19**–10, **21**–9, **16**–11, **24**–6			OVO Hydro; Umpires: Tracy-Ann Griffiths, Ken Metekingi; Reserve umpire: Gary Burgess
26 July 2026; 19:00	Report	Mary Cholhok 32/41 (78%); Alice Isoto 21/21 (100%); Shadiah Nassanga 19/20 (95%); Racheal Nanyonga 8/10 (80%)		Afeisha Noel 24/27 (89%); Demisha Henry 7/8 (88%); Joelisa Cooper 5/6 (83%)	OVO Hydro; Umpires: Tracy-Ann Griffiths, Ken Metekingi; Reserve umpire: Gary Burgess

27 July 2026; 19:00	Report	Uganda	49–**55**	**Jamaica**	OVO Hydro; Umpires: Gary Burgess, Justin Barnes; Reserve umpire: Kristie Simpson
27 July 2026; 19:00	Report	Scoring by quarter: **15**–12, 10–**17**, 14–14, 10–**12**			OVO Hydro; Umpires: Gary Burgess, Justin Barnes; Reserve umpire: Kristie Simpson
27 July 2026; 19:00	Report	Mary Cholhok 34/37 (92%); Shadiah Nassanga 12/12 (100%); Racheal Nanyonga 3/4 (75%)		Romelda Aiken-George 39/42 (93%); Rhea Dixon 9/12 (75%); Shanice Beckford 3/4 (75%)	OVO Hydro; Umpires: Gary Burgess, Justin Barnes; Reserve umpire: Kristie Simpson

28 July 2026; 19:00	Report	Uganda	50–**58**	**New Zealand**	OVO Hydro; Umpires: Louise Travis, Bronwen Adams; Reserve umpire: Justin Barnes
28 July 2026; 19:00	Report	Scoring by quarter: 14–**15**, 11–**13**, 10–**16**, **15**–14			OVO Hydro; Umpires: Louise Travis, Bronwen Adams; Reserve umpire: Justin Barnes
28 July 2026; 19:00	Report	Mary Cholhok 30/33 (91%); Shadiah Nassanga 19/20 (95%); Racheal Nanyonga 1/2 (50%)		Grace Nweke 19/20 (95%); Martina Salmon 16/20 (80%); Amelia Walsmley 14/16 (88%); Georgia Heffernan 9/10 (90%)	OVO Hydro; Umpires: Louise Travis, Bronwen Adams; Reserve umpire: Justin Barnes

30 July 2026; 11:00	Report	Scotland	56–**65**	**Uganda**	OVO Hydro; Umpires: Gareth Fowler, Ken Metekingi; Reserve umpire: Justin Barnes
30 July 2026; 11:00	Report	Scoring by quarter: 12–**17**, 10–**16**, 16–16, **18**–13			OVO Hydro; Umpires: Gareth Fowler, Ken Metekingi; Reserve umpire: Justin Barnes
30 July 2026; 11:00	Report	Cerys Cairns 23/26 (88%); Emma Barrie 22/26 (85%); Niamh McCall 10/12 (83%); Bethan Goodwin 1/1 (100%)		Mary Cholhok 46/55 (84%); Shadiah Nassanga 19/20 (95%)	OVO Hydro; Umpires: Gareth Fowler, Ken Metekingi; Reserve umpire: Justin Barnes

Fifth place match

31 July 2026; 16:00	Report	**South Africa**	**62**–54	Uganda	OVO Hydro; Umpires: Justin Barnes, Kristie Simpson; Reserve umpire: Bronwen Adams
31 July 2026; 16:00	Report	Scoring by quarter: 12–**17**, **20**–11, **16**–13, **14**–13			OVO Hydro; Umpires: Justin Barnes, Kristie Simpson; Reserve umpire: Bronwen Adams
31 July 2026; 16:00	Report	Elmeré van der Berg 48/49 (98%); Kamogelo Maseko 14/16 (88%)		Mary Cholhok 34/38 (89%); Shadiah Nassanga 20/22 (91%); Mercy Batamuliza 0/2 (0%)	OVO Hydro; Umpires: Justin Barnes, Kristie Simpson; Reserve umpire: Bronwen Adams

== Swimming ==
Uganda entered nine swimmers (four men and five women), including two female para swimmers.

Men

Athlete	Event	Heat		Semifinal		Final	
Athlete	Event	Time	Rank	Time	Rank	Time	Rank
Tendo Kaumi	50 m freestyle	22.63	9 **Q**	22.51	11	Did not advance	
Tendo Kaumi	100 m freestyle	51.51	33	Did not advance			
Tendo Kaumi	50 m backstroke	27.01	21	Did not advance			
Tendo Kaumi	50 m butterfly	24.77	22	Did not advance			
Tendo Mukalazi	50 m freestyle	23.47	23	Did not advance			
Tendo Mukalazi	100 m freestyle	52.63	42	Did not advance			
Tendo Mukalazi	50 m breaststroke	29.77	36	Did not advance			
Jordan Ssamula	50 m breaststroke	30.42	40	Did not advance			
Jordan Ssamula	100 m breaststroke	1:07.38	33	Did not advance			
Jordan Ssamula	200 m breaststroke	2:35.58	15	—N/a		Did not advance	
Jordan Ssamula	100 m butterfly	DQ		Did not advance			
Jesse Ssengonzi	50 m butterfly	24.68	20	Did not advance			
Jesse Ssengonzi	100 m butterfly	54.01	14 **Q**	54.32	16	Did not advance	
Tendo Kaumi; Tendo Mukalazi; Jordan Ssamula; Jesse Ssengonzi	4 × 100 m freestyle relay	3:32.47	11	—N/a		Did not advance	
Tendo Kaumi; Tendo Mukalazi; Jordan Ssamula; Jesse Ssengonzi	4 × 100 m medley relay	3:52.02	10	—N/a		Did not advance	

Women & Mixed

Athlete	Event	Heat		Semifinal		Final	
Athlete	Event	Time	Rank	Time	Rank	Time	Rank
Namutebi Kirabo	Women's 50 m freestyle	25.92	16 **Q**	25.73	15	Did not advance	
Namutebi Kirabo	Women's 50 m breaststroke	33.18	17	Did not advance			
Namutebi Kirabo	Women's 50 m butterfly	29.12	36	Did not advance			
Gloria Muzito	Women's 50 m freestyle	25.53	11 **Q**	25.70	14	Did not advance	
Gloria Muzito	Women's 100 m freestyle	55.88	17 **Q**	56.21	16	Did not advance	
Gloria Muzito	Women's 200 m freestyle	2:07.68	22	—N/a		Did not advance	
Gloria Muzito	Women's 50 m butterfly	28.55	27	Did not advance			
Tara Naluwoza	Women's 100 m freestyle	1:02.71	50	Did not advance			
Tara Naluwoza	Women's 50 m backstroke	32.66	35	Did not advance			
Tendo Kaumi; Jesse Ssengonzi; Namutebi Kirabo; Gloria Muzito	Mixed 4 × 100 m freestyle relay	3:37.11	6 **Q**	—N/a		3:37.14	7
Tendo Kaumi; Jesse Ssengonzi; Namutebi Kirabo; Gloria Muzito	Mixed 4 × 100 m medley relay	4:07.68	12	—N/a		Did not advance	

=== Para swimming ===
Women

Athlete	Event	Heat		Final	
Athlete	Event	Time	Rank	Time	Rank
**Husnah Kukundakwe**	100 m freestyle S9	1:15.70	8 **Q**	1:13.36	8
**Husnah Kukundakwe**	100 m breaststroke SB8	1:27.38	3 **Q**	1:26.20	2nd place, silver medalist(s)
Condoleeza Nakazibwe	100 m freestyle S9	1:18.45	9	Did not advance	

== Track cycling ==
Uganda entered one male track cyclist.

Time trial

Athlete	Event	Time	Rank
Charles Kagimu	Men's time trial	1:17.223	23

== Weightlifting ==
Uganda qualified one male weightlifter.

Athlete	Event	Snatch (kg)		Clean & Jerk (kg)		Total (kg)	Rank
Athlete	Event	Result	Rank	Result	Rank	Total (kg)	Rank
Davis Niyoyita	Men's 60 kg	105	6	NM		DNF	

=== Para powerlifting ===
Uganda qualified three para powerlifters (one man and two women).

Athlete	Event	Lift (kg)	Points	Rank
Denis Mbaziira	Men's heavyweight	180	114.1	5
Janet Nakayobyo	Women's lightweight	63	54.4	12
Rebecca Zawedde	Women's heavyweight	80	63.6	10
