= Nasiimu Mutesi =

Ugandan netball player

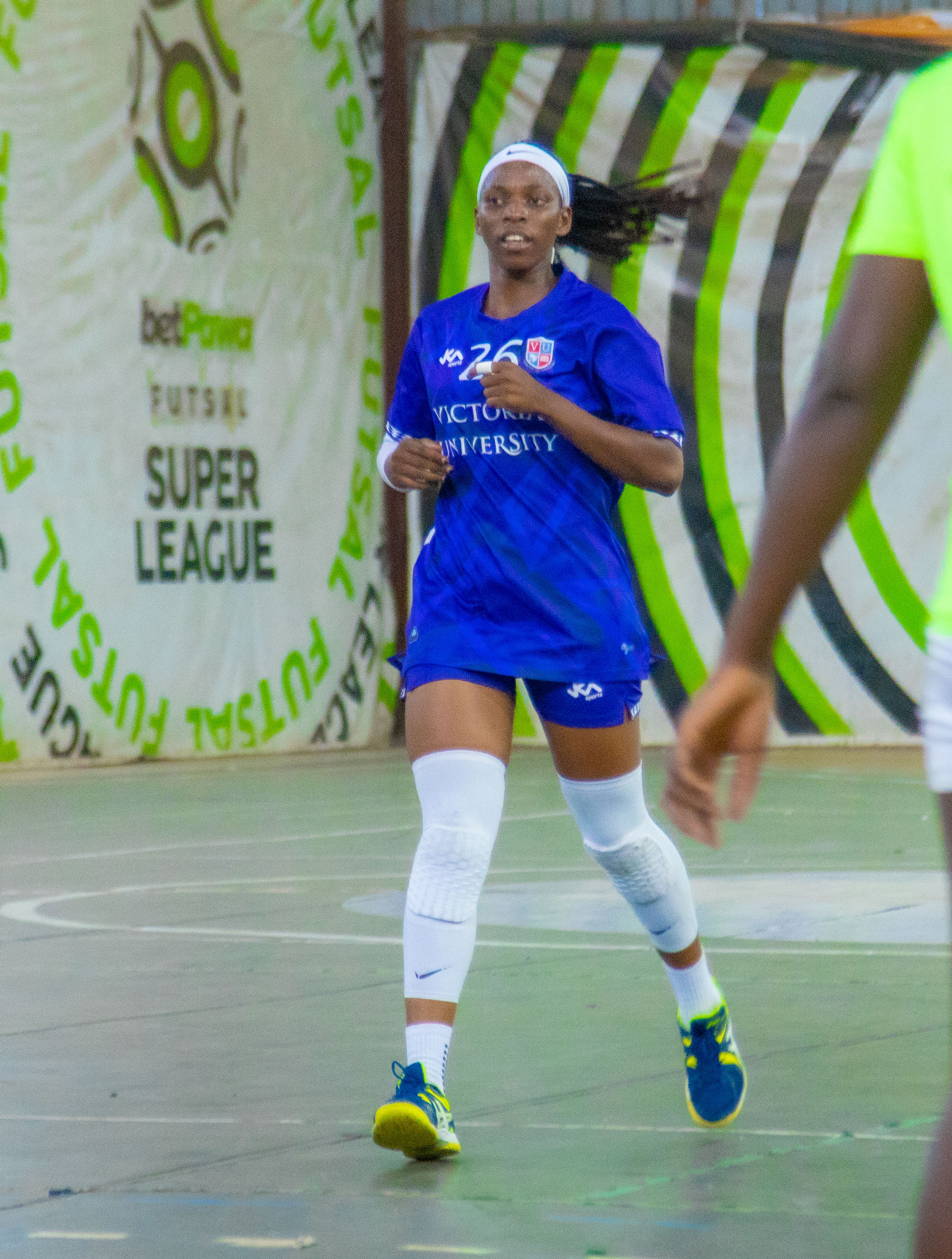

Personal information
- Full name: Nasiimu Mutesi
- Born: June 6, 2001 (age 25) Semuto, Nakaseke District, Uganda
- Education: Victoria University (BBA, Marketing)
- Occupations: Netballer, Handball player, Basketball player
- School: Kazo Junior School – Kawempe; Prosper High School – Matugga; Masaka Secondary School
- University: Victoria University

Netball career
- Playing position: Defender
Years	Club team	Apps
2020–present	NIC Netball Club	
Years	National team	Caps
2021–present	Uganda (She Cranes)	

Nasiimu Mutesi (born 6 June 2001) is a Ugandan professional netball player who plays as a defender in the National Insurance Corporation Netball Club and the Uganda national netball team referred to as She-Cranes. She also plays handball representing Victoria University and Uganda Women's National Handball Team (Nile Queens). She also plays basketball.

== History ==
Nasiimu was born to Mr. Mafumo Musa and Ms. Nassolo Rehemah in Semuto, Nakaseke District, Luweero triangle, Uganda.

== Education background ==
Nasiimu Mutesi started school in 2005 at Ellen White Bright Future Primary School Semuto after which she joined and completed her primary school studies at Kazo Junior School-Kawempe. She later joined Munta Royal College Bombo, Luweero District for senior one to senior three. And completed her Ordinary level studies in 2017 from Prosper High School Mattuga- Busiikiri. For Advanced level she went to Masaka Secondary School. She later joined Victoria University and did Bachelors in Business Administration. As of now she is pursuing a master's degree in Marketing still at Victoria University.

== Netball career ==
Nasiimu started playing netball while at Munta Royal College and even joined the school team. While at Masaka Secondary School she was the captain.

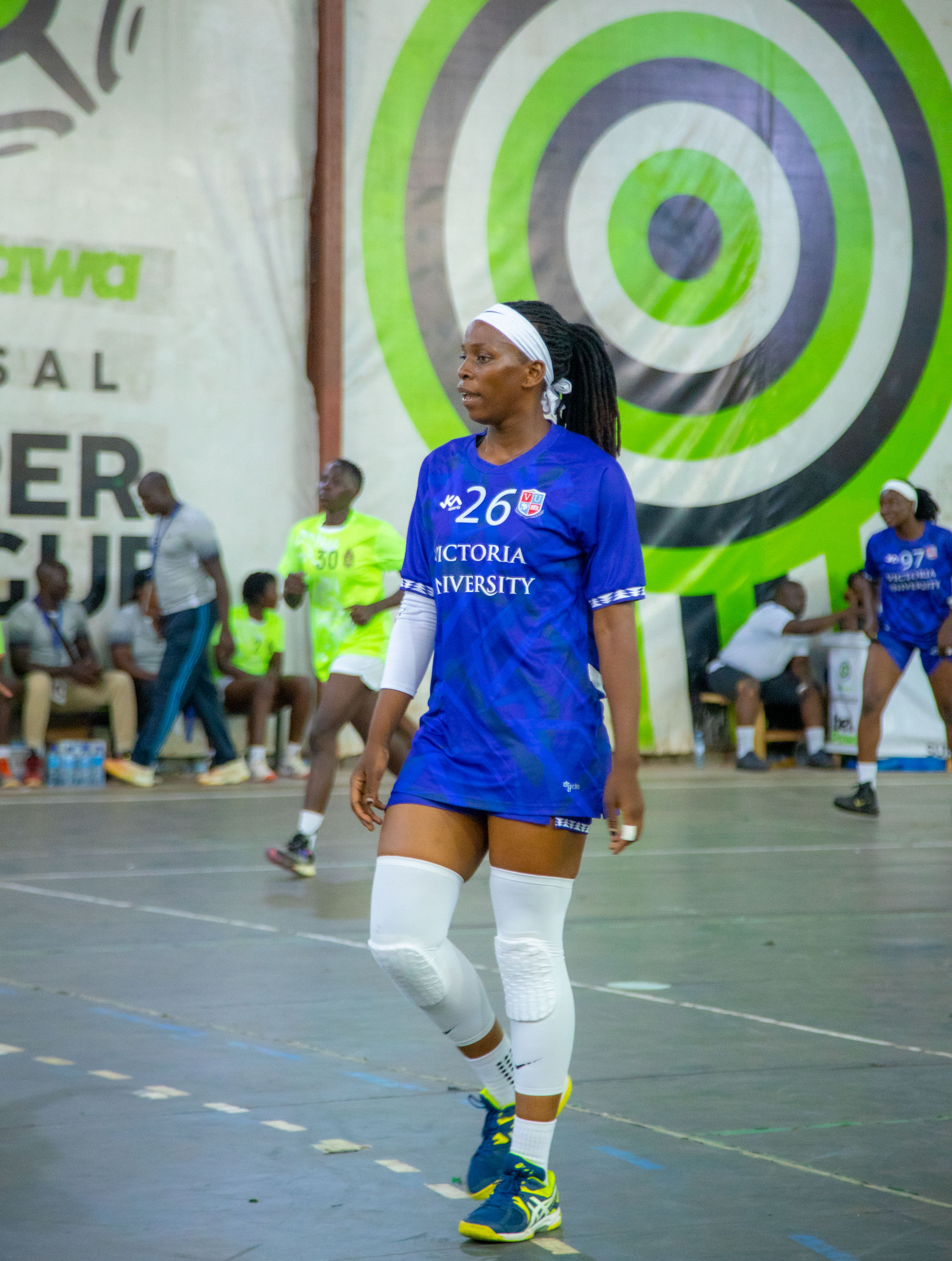
Nasiimu Mutesi

She attributes her success in the netball field to Coach Mugisha Ali who introduced her to NIC head coach, Vicent Kiwanuka and thus she was recruited in 2020. Later in 2021 she joined the Uganda National netball team (She Cranes).
