= Swimming at the 2026 Commonwealth Games – Women's 100 metre breaststroke SB8 =

Women's 100 metre breaststroke SB9 at the 2026 Commonwealth Games
- Venue: Tollcross International Swimming Centre
- Dates: 27 July
- Competitors: 6 from 3 nations
- Winning time: 1:22.05

Medalists
gold medal	Brock Whiston	England
silver medal	Husnah Kukundakwe	Uganda
bronze medal	Iona Winnifrith	England

The women's 100 metre breaststroke SB9 event at the 2026 Commonwealth Games was held on 27 July at the Tollcross International Swimming Centre.

== Schedule ==
The schedule is as follows:

All times are British Summer Time (UTC+1)

Date	Time	Round
Monday 27 July 2026	10:30	Heat
Monday 27 July 2026	19:00	Final

== Results ==
=== Heat ===
The heat was held on the morning of 27 July 2026.

Heat results
Rank	Lane	Swimmer	Nation	Time	Notes
1	4	Brock Whiston (SB8)	England	1:27.02	Q
2	5	Iona Winnifrith (SB7)	England	1:27.04	Q
3	3	Husnah Kukundakwe (SB8)	Uganda	1:27.38	Q
4	6	Alyssa Gillespie (SB8)	Australia	1:32.20	Q
5	2	Gemma Sellick (SB8)	Australia	1:35.37	Q
6	7	Isabella Haynes (SB8)	England	1:37.57	Q

=== Final ===
The final took place during of the evening of 27 July 2026.

Final results
Rank	Lane	Swimmer	Nation	Time	Notes
1st place, gold medalist(s)	4	Brock Whiston (SB8)	England	1:22.05	
2nd place, silver medalist(s)	3	Husnah Kukundakwe (SB8)	Uganda	1:26.20	
3rd place, bronze medalist(s)	5	Iona Winnifrith (SB7)	England	1:26.31	
4	6	Alyssa Gillespie (SB8)	Australia	1:32.80	
5	2	Gemma Sellick (SB8)	Australia	1:33.95	
6	7	Isabella Haynes (SB8)	England	1:34.35	
