= Monica Azuba Ntege =

Ugandan politician (1956–2026)

- Born: Monica Azuba; 12 February 1956
- Died: 21 April 2026 (aged 70); Kampala, Uganda
- Citizenship: Ugandan
- Education: Makerere University (Bachelor of Science in Civil Engineering)
- Occupations: Engineer, politician
- Years active: 1978–2026
- Title: Cabinet Minister of Works and Transport

Monica Azuba Ntege (12 February 1956 – 21 April 2026) was a Ugandan politician and engineer. She was the Minister of Works and Transport in the Ugandan Cabinet. She was appointed to that position on 6 June 2016 replacing John Byabagambi, who became Minister for Karamoja. She was replaced by Katumba Wamala in the cabinet on 14 December 2019.

== Background and education ==
Monica Azuba was born in the Busoga sub-region, in the Eastern Region of Uganda. She attended Gayaza High School for her O-Level and A-Level studies, graduating in 1973. Azuba entered Makerere University in 1974, graduating in 1978 with a Bachelor of Science in Civil Engineering.

== Career ==
Azuba Ntege was employed by Uganda Commercial Bank after graduating from Makerere in 1978. When it was purchased by Standard Bank of South Africa in 2002, she stayed with the institution, rising to the position of Facilities Manager at Stanbic Bank Uganda Limited. She has served as a member of the board of Uganda National Roads Authority since June 2014. On 6 June 2016, she was appointed Minister of Works and Transport.

=== Work as Minister of Works and Transport ===
One of the first tasks that she was handed, soon after taking the oath as the works and transport minister, was to evaluate how the government of Uganda is going to revive the defunct Uganda Airlines. The national airline was liquidated in 2001, because it was deemed "unprofitable".

However, in 2013, a decision was made to revive the airline, in order to increase the number of tourists visiting Uganda and to cater for increased human and cargo traffic to the country as Uganda's nascent petrochemical industry grows. The major stakeholders under the chairmanship of the minister, including representatives from the Ministry of Works and Transport, the Uganda Development Corporation, the Civil Aviation Authority of Uganda, the Ministry of Trade, Industry and Cooperatives, the Ministry of Finance, Planning and Economic Development and others met and made recommendations. These were forwarded to cabinet for final approval before implementation.

== Personal life and death ==
Ntege was married. She was a champion golfer and won several tournaments nationally and regionally. Azuba Ntege also served as a regional trustee of the All Africa Challenge Trophy in ladies golf.

Azuba Ntege died in Kampala on 21 April 2026.

== See also ==
- Cabinet of Uganda
- Parliament of Uganda
- James Zikusoka
