= Martin Aliker =

Ugandan businessman (1925–2024)

- Born: 21 October 1920; Gulu, Protectorate of Uganda
- Died: 15 April 2024 (aged 95)
- Education: Makerere University (did not graduate); Northwestern University (Bachelor of Arts) (Doctor of Dental Surgery); Royal College of Surgeons of England (Fellow of the Royal College of Surgeons)
- Occupations: Dental surgeon and businessman
- Years active: 1962–2024

Martin Jerome Okec Aliker (21 October 1928 – 15 April 2024) was a Ugandan dental surgeon, businessman, and community leader. He was a senior adviser to the President of Uganda and sat on the board of directors of nearly forty Ugandan companies. He was the chancellor of Victoria University Uganda, a private institution. From 2004 until 2014, he served as the founding chancellor of Gulu University, a public university.

== Background and education ==
Aliker was born in Gulu District on 21 October 1928 to Rwot Lacito Okech and Julaina Auma, a daughter of Musa Ali, the first ordained Anglican priest in the region of the Acholi. He attended Gulu High School for his primary education, before transferring to Kings College Budo for his O-Level studies. In 1948, he was admitted to Makerere University, the oldest public university in East Africa. Before he could complete his studies at Makerere, he won a scholarship to Northwestern University, in Chicago, Illinois, United States, where he studied political science, graduating with a Bachelor of Arts degree. Following that, he was awarded a Fulbright Scholarship to study dental surgery, also at Northwestern, graduating with a Doctor of Dental Surgery. Later, he was awarded the title of Fellow of the Royal College of Surgeons by the Royal College of Surgeons of England.

== Lifestyle ==
After his doctorate studies in the United States, Aliker returned to Uganda and took up employment as a government dental surgeon. Later, he left the public service and set up the first private dental practice in Uganda owned by an African.

In 1971, when Idi Amin captured power in a coup d'état, his residence shared the back wall with Aliker's house. Amin's security people ordered him to move away from his home because he was deemed a security risk to Amin.

In late 1972, he fled to Nairobi, Kenya because of the deteriorating security situation in Uganda. While in Nairobi, he set up a lucrative dental practice, staying there until 1998, when he came back to Uganda. On his return, he was able to repossess his home.

== Investments ==
Starting in the 1960s, Aliker began buying shares in blue chip companies, including the Uganda Commercial Bank and the National Insurance Company. As of October 2014, Aliker was a shareholder in the following publicly traded Ugandan companies, among others: Stanbic Bank Uganda; Uganda Clays Limited; Nation Media Group; National Insurance Corporation; East African Breweries. He sat on the boards of many of these companies and was the chairman of Uganda Clays Limited.

== Other responsibilities ==
Aliker sat on the Actis East African Advisory Board, launched by Actis, the private equity firm affiliated with the Commonwealth Development Corporation. In July 2014, he was appointed chairman of the board of trustees of the Makerere University Endowment Fund.

== Death ==
Aliker died on 15 April 2024, at the age of 95.

== See also ==
- James Zikusoka
- Economy of Uganda
