= Annet Katusiime Mugisha =

Ugandan politician (born 1974)

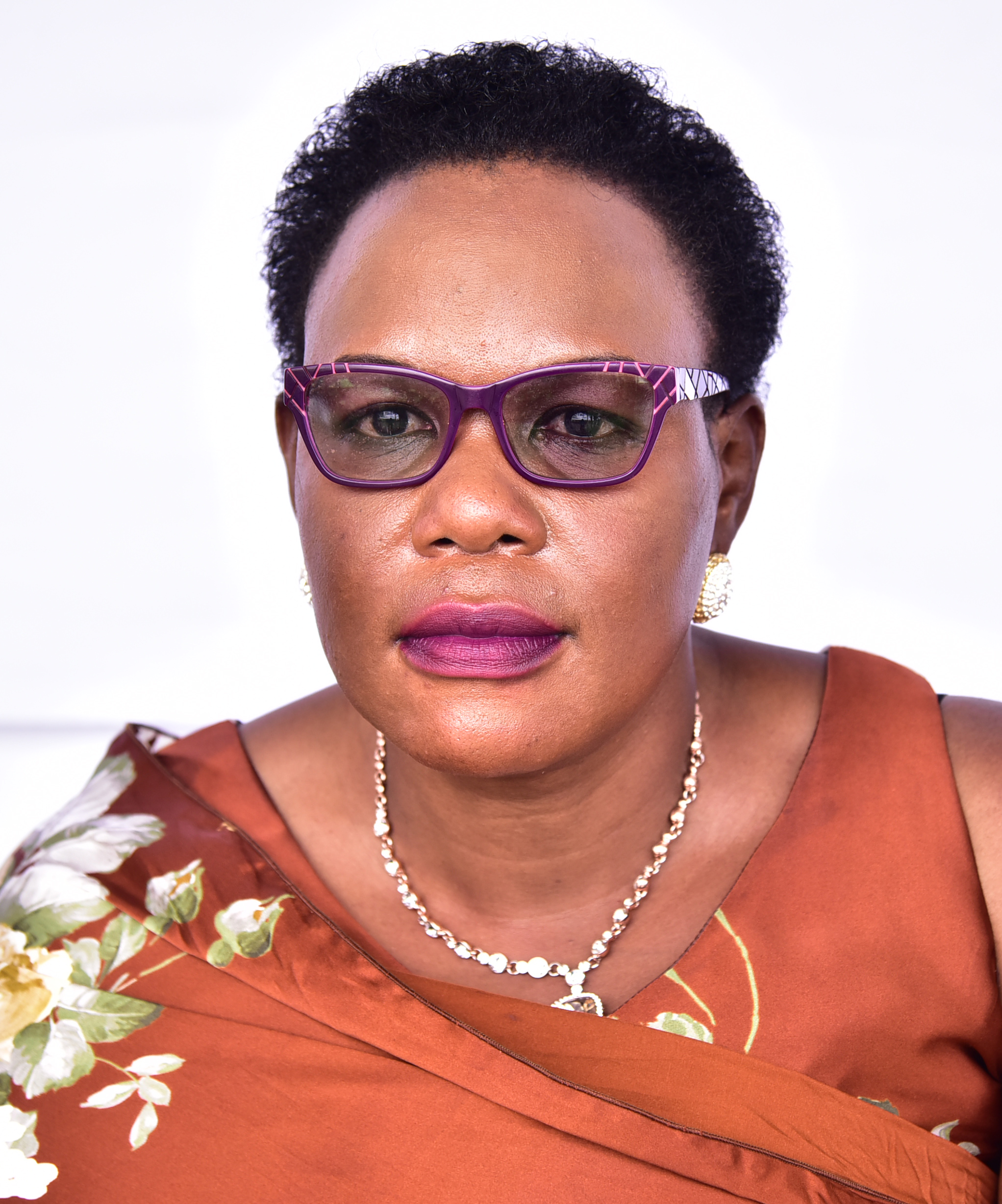
- Born: 1974 (age 51–52); Kantunda village Bumbaire sub-county Bushenyi District
- Education: Uganda Martyrs University
- Occupations: psychologist, politician, counsellor, investor, and preacher
- Political party: National Resistance Movement
- Spouse: Silver Mugisha

Annet Katusiime Mugisha (born 1974) is a Ugandan politician serving as a member of the 11th Parliament of Uganda, representing the Bushenyi District.

== Early life and education ==
Mugisha was born in 1974 in Katunda village, Bumbaire sub-county, Bushenyi District, Uganda. She holds a degree in guidance and counseling from Uganda Martyrs University, a private Catholic university in Nkozi, Uganda. In 2021, she began pursuing a Master's in Business Administration (MBA) at the same university.

== Career ==
=== Professional ===
Mugisha previously worked as a primary school teacher and currently runs a catering company. She is a psychologist by profession, a counsellor, investor, and preacher. She and her husband Silver Mugisha, the CEO and Managing Director of the Ugandan National Water and Sewerage Corporation, founded Bamugisha Community Welfare Ltd., an NGO whose purposes are reportedly to increase access to education, improve household income, and provide food security and environmental protection for the residents of the Bushenyi District.

=== Political ===
Mugisha is affiliated with the National Resistance Movement (NRM) party of Uganda. Her political career began with the 2021 parliamentary elections, in which she prevailed against Mary Karooro Okurut in the NRM primaries and subsequently won a seat in the general parliamentary election. While campaigning for the primary election, Mugisha was accused of using forged academic credentials in a petition led by Zeddy Gakyalo and Phillip Murwani. Mugisha denied the accusations, justifying the claimed inconsistencies in her documents with a legal change of name from Musoga to Mugisha.
