= Statewide Insurance Company =

Statewide Insurance Company Limited (SWICO)
- Type: Private
- Industry: Financial services
- Founded: 1982; 44 years ago
- Headquarters: Sure House, 1 Bombo Road, Kampala, Uganda
- Key people: John Ssebaana Kizito (Chairman), Joseph W. Kiwanuka (Managing Director)
- Products: Insurance, investments, real estate
- Website: www.swico.co.ug

Statewide Insurance Company (SWICO), is a Ugandan insurance company. The company is a leading provider of insurance and risk management services in Uganda.

SWICO is one of the licensed insurance companies in the country. Its investments include real estate, the largest of which is Sure House at 1 Bombo Road in Kampala's central business district, which houses SWICO's headquarters.

== History ==
In 1982, John Ssebaana Kizito, a Ugandan businessman, economist, and politician, together with a business associate, Joseph W. Kiwanuka, pooled resources and started SWICO. The company is the oldest privately owned insurance company in Uganda.

== Ownership ==
One of SWICO's original shareholders was the founding chairman of the board, Kizito, who was one of the wealthiest people in Uganda in 2012 according to a published report.

== Branch network ==
The company has a branch network in the following Ugandan locations:

1. Main Branch – Sure House, 1 Bombo Road, Kampala
2. Arua Branch – Ouzu Plaza, Adumi Road, Arua
3. Entebbe Branch – 33-35 Kampala Road, Entebbe
4. Fort Portal Branch – 14 Bwamba Road, Fort Portal
5. Gulu Branch – 1 Atwal Road, Gulu
6. Hoima Branch – 36 Fort Portal Road, Hoima
7. Iganga Branch – 56 Main Street, Iganga
8. Jinja Branch – Bemtex Plaza, 68 Main Street, Jinja
9. Lira Branch – 26D Kwania Road, Lira
10. Masaka Branch – 14 Edward Avenue, Masaka
11. Mbale Branch – 4 Manafa Road, Mbale
12. Mbarara Branch – Pride House, 37A High Street, Mbarara
13. Mityana Branch – 53B Station Road, Mityana
14. Soroti Branch – 4 Cemetery Road, Soroti

== See also ==
- List of insurance companies in Uganda
- National Insurance Corporation
- Uganda Economy
