= Global Trust Bank (Uganda) =

- Company type: Private
- Industry: Financial services
- Founded: 2008
- Fate: Liquidated in 2014
- Headquarters: Kampala, Uganda
- Key people: Erisa Olwenyi; Acting Chairperson; Morenikeji Oludotun Adepoju; Managing Director
- Products: Loans, Savings, Checking, Investments, Debit Cards, Credit Cards, Mortgages
- Revenue: ▼Pretax:US$743,400 (UGX:1.8 billion) (2011)
- Total assets: US$37.1 million (UGX:90 billion) (2011)
- Number of employees: 200 (2008)
- Website: Homepage

Global Trust Bank (Uganda) Limited (GTBU), commonly referred to as Global Trust Bank (GTBU), was a commercial bank in Uganda which started operations in 2008 and was closed down in 2014. Its headquarters were located in a five-storey building on Kampala Road in the center of Uganda's capital, Kampala. It was licensed as a commercial bank by Bank of Uganda, the central bank and national banking regulator.

The bank was a small financial services provider in Uganda. As of December 2011, its total asset valuation was approximately US$35.1 million (UGX:85 billion), with shareholders' equity of about US$17.2 million (UGX:41.53 billion). Available reports indicate that the bank broke even in 2011 and began making profits in 2012. Global Trust Bank was evaluating the introduction of Sharia banking in Uganda.

== Ownership ==
As of May 2014, Global Trust Bank was 45.3% owned by Nigeria's largest insurance company Industrial and General Insurance Company Plc. (IGI). The remaining 54.7% was owned by four corporate investors, each holding less than 5%, and by eight individual investors, each holding no more than 5% of the bank's issued and authorized share capital.

Global Trust Bank Stock Ownership
Rank	Name of Owner	Percentage Ownership
1	Industrial and General Insurance Company (IGI)	45.3
2	Corporate Investors (4)	Under 20.0
3	Individual Investors (8)	Under 40.0
	Total	100.0

- Other than IGI, none of the other corporate and individual shareholders of the Bank held up to 5% of the issued and authorized share capital of the Bank.

== Domestic Branches ==
As of May 2014, Global Trust Bank had a network of branches at the following locations:

Operational branches

1. Busia Branch - 1 Sofia Road, Customs Yard, Busia
2. Butaleja Branch - Butaleja District Headquarters, Butaleja
3. Bwaise Branch - 975-976 Sir Apollo Kaggwa Road, Bwaise, Kampala
4. Entebbe Airport Branch - Entebbe International Airport, Entebbe
5. Head Office - 2A Kampala Road, Kampala (Main Branch)
6. Kibuku Branch - Kibuku District Headquarters, Kibuku
7. Kikuubo Branch - 1st Floor Nabugabo Business Centre, Kampala
8. Malaba Branch - Malaba Customs Building, Malaba
9. Mbarara Branch - 4 Bulemba Road, Mbarara
10. Mbale Branch - 1-3 Manafwa Road, Mbale
11. Mukono Branch - 36 Jinja Road, Mukono
12. Mutukula Branch - Mutukula URA Building, Customs Bond, Mutukula
13. Najjanankumbi Branch - 1032 Block 12 Entebbe Road, Najjanankumbi
14. Nateete Branch - 757 Wakaliga, Nateete, Kampala
15. Nkozi Branch - Uganda Martyrs University Campus, Nkozi
16. Owino Branch - St. Balikuddembe Market, 19 Nakivubo Place, Kampala
17. Paidha Branch - 21 Nebbi- Arua Road, Paidha
18. Pallisa Branch - 8 Kasodo Road, Pallisa
19. Rubirizi District - Rubirizi, Rubirizi District
20. Serere Branch - Serere District Headquarters, Serere
21. Tororo Branch - 11/9 Mbale Road, Tororo

Branches in development

1. Amuria Branch - Amuria, Amuria District
2. Gulu University Branch - Gulu University Campus, Gulu
3. Kamwenge Branch - Kamwenge, Kamwenge District
4. Kole Branch - Kole, Kole District
5. Zombo Branch - Zombo, Zombo District

== Regional Network ==
In January 2009, Global Trust Bank announced plans to expand operations into the neighboring countries of Burundi, Rwanda and South Sudan. In November 2009, the bank announced that it would pivot its focus towards small and medium enterprises (SMEs), using Internet-based and mobile-phone platforms. A reduction in the number of branches was contemplated, but was not implemented. In May 2011, the bank joined "Bankcom Network", a bank switch system that connects the ATMs of member banks. Global Trust Bank was the 8th Ugandan commercial bank to join the Bankcom switch.

== Bank Chief Executive ==
In December 2008, Richard Byarugaba, a Ugandan with over 25 years of banking experience, became the first managing director of Global Trust Bank. Prior to becoming director, Byarugaba worked in various capacities at Barclays Bank, Nile Bank Limited, and Standard Chartered Bank. He was Chief Operations Officer at Barclays Bank immediately before joining Global Trust Bank. He had held several board positions at Standard Chartered Bank, Nile Bank, Hospice Africa, Palliative Care Association of Uganda and the Uganda Institute of Banking and Financial Services. Byarugaba is also the former president of the Uganda Institute of Bankers.

In August 2010, following the appointment of Richard Byarugaba as the executive director of the National Social Security Fund, Charles Ajaegbu, a native of Nigeria, with over 20 years of banking experience, was appointed Managing Director of the bank. He holds degrees in Law and Business. Prior to becoming director, Ajaegbu served as the Director of Business Development at Global Trust Bank.

As of May 2014, the Managing Director of GTBU was Morenikeji Oludotun Adepoju, a native Nigerian with over 22 years of banking experience in Anglophone and Francophone West Africa.

== Liquidation ==
On Friday 25 July 2014, the Bank of Uganda, revoked the banking license of Global Trust Bank and closed down the institution with immediate effect. DFCU Bank acquired some of GTB's assets and liabilities, including customer deposits and loan accounts. Those assets DFCU Bank did not acquire are to be liquidated. Bank of Uganda cited two reasons for the closure. The first was lack of profitability. At the time of liquidation, GTB had accumulated losses totaling UGX:60 billion (US$24 million). The second was lack of "accuracy of the information provided to government".

== Photos ==
- Headquarters of Global Trust Bank on Kampala Road

== See also ==
- Banking in Uganda
- List of banks in Uganda
- National Insurance Corporation
- Industrial and General Insurance Company

== External sources ==
- Global Trust Bank Website
- Profile At Banks-Uganda.com
- Global Trust Bank Profile In 2012
