= Insurance Towers =

- Location within Kampala

General information
- Type: Government offices & retail rental space
- Location: 6 Lumumba Avenue, Nakasero, Kampala, Uganda
- Coordinates: 00°19′04″N 32°34′42″E

Technical details
- Floor count: 13
- Floor area: 16,500 square metres (178,000 ft^{2})
- Lifts/elevators: 4

Design and construction
- Architect: Roko Construction Company Limited

The Insurance Towers is a government building in Kampala, Uganda which houses the headquarters of the Insurance Regulatory Authority of Uganda.

== Location ==
The building is located at Plot 6 Lumumba Avenue on Nakasero Hill, in the Central Division of Kampala, Uganda's capital and largest city. This is approximately 1.5 kilometres (1 mi) by automobile, north-west of the city's central business district. The coordinates of the building are: 0°19'04.0"N, 32°34'42.0"E (Latitude:0.317778; Longitude:32.578333).

== Overview ==
The Insurance Towers building was constructed by the Insurance Regulatory Authority of Uganda (IRAU). Prior to this building's construction, the IRAU was renting 487 square metres (5,240 ft^{2}) of office space from Legacy Towers, at 5 Kyaddondo Road on Nakasero Hill, not far from this site, at a cost of US$10,227 per month.

The IRAU will rent out the balance of office space that it does not occupy at Insurance Towers, to raise resources to run its mandated affairs. IRAU is required to be operationally accountable, transparent, independent, and with adequate resources. This building will help IRAU meet those objectives.

The building is expected to have two underground floors and eleven above-ground floors. Its total space offering is planned at 16,500 square metres (178,000 ft^{2}), consisting of both office and retail space.

== Construction ==
Construction of the building commenced in March 2018, with commissioning expected in September 2019. ROKO Construction Company, a Uganda-based construction company, won the contract to build the tower at a cost of USh28.4 billion (approx. US$7.6 million).

== See also ==
- List of tallest buildings in Kampala
