= Industrial and General Insurance Company =

Industrial and General Insurance Company Plc (IGI)
- Type: Private company
- Industry: Financial services
- Founded: 1991
- Headquarters: Lagos, Nigeria
- Key people: Yakubu Gowon (chairman), Remi Olowude (executive vice chairman & CEO)
- Products: Insurance, banking, investments
- Total assets: US$338 million (NGN:53.1 billion) (2010)
- Website: iginigeria.com

Industrial and General Insurance (IGI) is a Nigerian insurance company and is a major provider of insurance and risk management services in West Africa. It has subsidiaries, in Ghana, the Gambia, Rwanda and Uganda and a representative offices in London and Washington, DC.

The company's main focus is insurance services, but through subsidiary companies, it is also invested in a diverse array of other sectors, including: banking, construction, engineering, mining, real estate, telecommunications and waste management.

As of December 2010, the company's total assets were estimated at about US$338 million (NGN:53.1 billion), with shareholders' equity of about US$140 million (NGN:22 billion). At that time, IGI was the largest insurance company in Nigeria and the largest underwriter in West Africa.

== History ==
Industrial and General Insurance Company Plc was founded as a limited liability company on 31 October 1991 by Oluremi (Remi) Olowude. The company commenced business in January 1992. Remi Olowude was both founder and CEO until he died in September 2014.

In January 2024, the Federal High Court of Nigeria stopped the company from holding its proposed Annual General Meeting pending the hearing of a suit filed by shareholders of the company.

== Branch network ==
The company has a branch network in 45 urban locations in the majority of states in the Federal Republic of Nigeria.

== Products and services ==
The products and services offered by IGI include the following classes of insurance and non-insurance services:

- Individual Life Products
- Group Life Products
- Aviation Insurance
- Engineering Insurance
- General Business Insurance
- Global Health Insurance Plan
- Marine Insurance
- Oil & Energy Insurance Services

== Other investments ==
The company, either alone or together with other subsidiaries, is an investor in the following entities:

- National Insurance Corporation – IGI is the majority shareholder (51%) in NIC, the largest insurance company in Uganda.
- Global Trust Bank – IGI and its Ugandan subsidiary NIC, jointly owned 91% of Uganda's 15th largest bank by assets; the bank failed in 2014 and DFCU Bank acquired the deposits and viable assets.
- DFCU Group – Through NIC, IGI is a minority shareholder in the holding company of DFCU Bank, the 5th largest bank in Uganda.
- SONARWA – IGI owns a controlling majority interest in Rwanda's largest insurance company.
- Industrial and General Insurance Company (Ghana) Limited.
- IGI Life Assurance Ghana Limited – Accra, Ghana
- Monarch Communications Limited – Lagos, Nigeria
- Global Trust Savings and Loans Limited – Lagos, Nigeria
- IGI Gamstar Insurance Company Limited, the Gambia – Banjul, the Gambia
- All Crown Registrars Limited
- IGI Pension Fund Managers Limited
- International Health Management Services Limited.

== Governance ==
The governing body of the company is the twelve-member board of directors. General Yakubu Gowon, one of the non-executive board members, is the chairman.

== See also ==
- National Insurance Company
- Economy of Nigeria
