= Ministry of Public Service (Uganda) =

Government ministry of Uganda

Coordinates: 00°19′53″N 32°34′34″E

- Coat of Arms of Uganda

Ministry overview
- Type: Ministry
- Jurisdiction: Government of Uganda
- Headquarters: 12 Nakasero Hill Road, Wandegeya; Kampala, Uganda
- Ministry executive: Wilson Muruli Mukasa, Minister of Public Service
- Website: Homepage

The Uganda Ministry of Public Service is a Cabinet level government ministry. The ministry is mandated to "develop, manage and administer human resource policies, management systems, procedures and structure for the public service" in Uganda.

The ministry is headed by a Cabinet minister, Wilson Muruli Mukasa.

== Location ==
The headquarters of the ministry are located at 12 Nakasero Hill Road in the neighborhood of Wandegeya in Kampala, the capital city of Uganda. The coordinates of the headquarters of the ministry are 0°19'53.0"N, 32°34'34.0"E (Latitude:0.331389; Longitude:32.576111).

== Overview ==
The ministry is organised under three directorates:

- Directorate of Research and Development
  - Monitoring and Evaluation Department
  - Information, Education and Communication Department
- Directorate of Efficiency and Quality Assurance
  - Department of Public Service Inspection
  - Management Services Department
  - Department for Records and Information Technology
- Directorate of Human Resource Management
  - Department of Human Resource Management
  - Department of Compensation
  - Department of Human Resource Development

== Administrative structure ==
The cabinet minister is assisted by State Minister for Public Service David Karubanga. The chief accounting officer for the ministry is Permanent Secretary Catherine Bitarakwate Musingwiire.

== List of ministers ==
- Wilson Muruli Mukasa (6 June 2016 - present)
- Henry Kajura ( - 6 June 2016)
