= Insurance Regulatory Authority of Uganda =

Government agency

Coordinates: 00°19′03.5″N 32°34′41.5″E

- IRAU

Agency overview
- Formed: 1997
- Jurisdiction: Government of Uganda
- Headquarters: Nakasero, Kampala, Uganda
- Agency executives: Isaac Nkote Nabeta, Chairman of the board; Kaddunabbi Ibrahim Lubega, Chief executive officer
- Parent agency: Uganda Ministry of Finance, Planning and Economic Development
- Website: ira.go.ug

The Insurance Regulatory Authority of Uganda (IRAU) is a government agency mandated to "ensure the effective administration, supervision, regulation and control of the business of Insurance in Uganda".

== Location ==
The headquarters of IRAU are located at: Plot 6 Lumumba Avenue, on Nakasero Hill in the Kampala Central Division. The coordinates of the IRAU headquarters Kampala are:0°19'03.5"N 32°34'41.5"E.

In March 2018, construction began on Insurance Towers, a 13-floor skyscraper to house the headquarters of IRAU. The 16,500 square metres (178,000 ft^{2}) building is being built by Roko Construction Company Limited, at a cost of USh28.4 billion (approx. US$7.6 million). Completion is expected in September 2019.

== History ==
The agency was created in 1997 by an Act of Parliament. This followed the liberalization and privatization policies of Uganda's government, which ended its direct provision of goods and services and the adoption the role of supervisor and regulator.

== Administration ==
The policy-setting, seven-member board of directors is chaired by Isaac Nkote Nabeta. The seven-person Senior Management Team is led by Kaddunabbi Ibrahim Lubega, the chief executive officer, who also sits on the board.

== Recent developments ==
In July 2014, IRAU directed every insurer in the country to form separate companies dealing in life business (life policies, annuities, etc.) and general business (liability, automobile, general risk, etc.). The objective was to prevent a downturn in one type of business from spreading risk across the entire industry. Also, foreign insurance companies were instructed to have no more than two non-Ugandans in their top management, with one of the top two being Ugandan. That same regulation also required at least half the members of the board of directors of each insurance company to reside inside Uganda. These measures were aimed at encouraging the development of local talent and capacity building within the industry. Businesses were given until 1 January 2015 to comply.

== Mission ==
To create an enabling regulatory environment for sustainable growth of the insurance industry while upholding best practices.

== Vision ==
A model regulator of a developed and secure insurance industry.

== Core Values ==
Integrity, Innovation and Resilience

== See also ==
- Economy of Uganda
- List of insurance companies in Uganda
- List of financial supervisory authorities by country
