= Stanislaus Okurut =

Ugandan politician

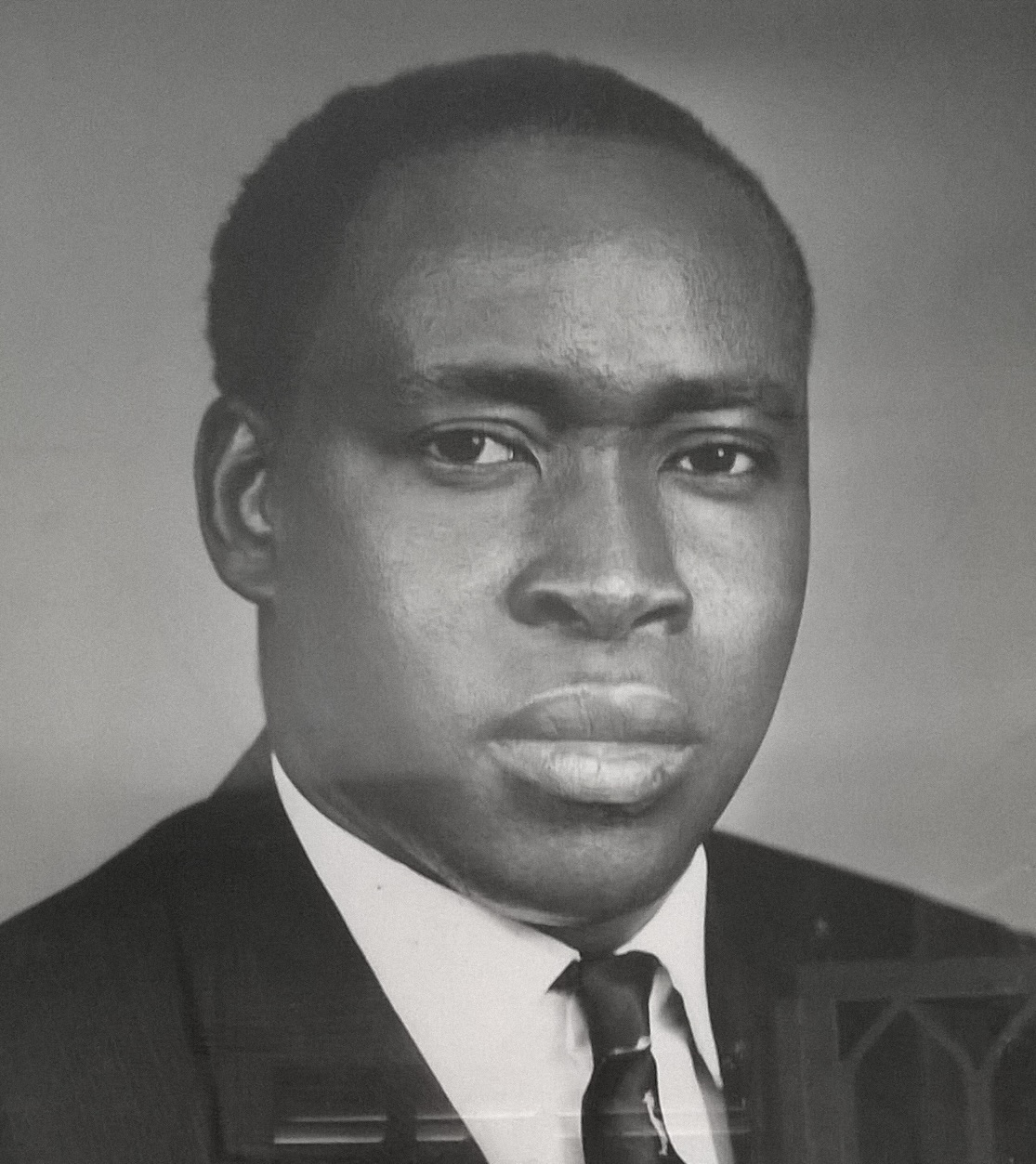
- Born: October 1929; Ngora District
- Died: April 5, 2014 (aged 84); Ntinda Kampala
- Burial place: Ngora District
- Education: Makerere University
- Occupation: Politician
- Known for: Government Service; Peace negotiations in Teso region
- Spouse: Mary Karooro Okurut
- Children: 8

Stanislaus Kostka Ebyau Okurut, commonly known as Stanislaus Okurut, was a prominent Ugandan politician from Teso who served as the Minister of Sports as well as separate tenures as the Minister of Labour and Minister of Transport. He served as Cabinet minister under the National Resistance Movement (NRM) government and the post-independence government under Apollo Milton Obote.

== Early life and education ==
Okurut was born in Oluwa village, Kapir sub-county in present-day Ngora district in the Eastern Region of Uganda to the late Ernest Ebyau and Berita Isone in October 1929. He attended Ngora Primary School for his early education before joining Soroti Angels School. He later joined Madera Senior Secondary School for his secondary education which he concluded at Tororo College. He proceeded to Mbarara where he trained as a secondary school teacher. He later studied at St. Mary's College of London University and Makerere University.

== Career ==
Having studied to become a teacher, Okurut had no intentions of joining politics. However, when one of uncles who had been a member of the Legislative Council (LEGCO) passed on, the people of Ngora urged him to replace his deceased uncle. After Uganda attained independence in 1962, Okurut was again elected to parliament on the Democratic Party ticket. He later crossed to Uganda People's Congress (UPC) and was appointed State Minister for Works and Transport.

After the 1971 military coup by Idi Amin, Okurut spent the next 8 years in hiding - like most other high-ranking officials who served in the previous government. He was later appointed the Chairman of the Advisory Board of Trade in the second Milton Obote government from 1980-1984.

In 1986 when the National Resistance Movement (NRM) took over power, Okurut was appointed State Minister for Transport. He would go on to hold several ministerial positions under the NRM government including Minister of Labour as well as Minister of Youth, Culture and Sports. He also represented the people of Kumi County in the National Resistance Council (Legislature) from 1989-1996.

While serving as Minister for Youth, Culture and Sports, Okurut was tasked by government - together with 2 other ministers from the Teso sub region (the late George Aporu Okol and the late Robert Ekinu) - to lead a delegation tasked with negotiating peace with Uganda People's Army led by Peter Otai. Uganda People's Army was a Teso-based rebel group fighting the NRM government and the leadership of President Yoweri Museveni. During one of their many peace missions, the three ministers were taken captive by these rebels and Okurut spent about nine months in captivity before he was rescued by the National Resistance Army (NRA) after a shootout in August 1988 at Dakabela, near Soroti town. Aporu Okol who was the youngest of the three ministers was released by the rebels shortly after their capture in December 1987 as a goodwill gesture, while Robert Ekinu was killed in the crossfire during a rescue operation by government forces at Dakabela.

Immediately after his rescue, Okurut continued to pursue peace with the same rebels that had once held him captive. He was able to persuade their leaders like Ateker Ejalu to give up rebellion and join the NRM government. Between 1986 and 1989, Okurut together with the late Ateker Ejalu, Aporu Okol and Brig Gen Chef Ali met the rebels several times to persuade them to give up armed rebellion in exchange for government support.

Okurut is also remembered for the role he played as sports minister in reviving the Chinese offer to build the Mandela National Stadium at Namboole. As transport minister, he also oversaw the construction of the Tirinyi-Mbale road, ending the use of boats as the main means of transport on river Mpologoma.

== Personal life ==
Okurut was married to Mary Karooro, a former Member of Parliament for Bushenyi District who served as the Minister of Gender, Labour and Social Development since 2012 and died on August 11, 2025. Together, they raised eight children: five boys and three girls.

== Death ==
Okurut died from a heart attack at his home in Ntinda, Kampala, Uganda, on 5 April 2014, at the age of 84. He had undergone minor surgery earlier in the week.

== See also ==
- Musa Ecweru
- Mary Karooro
- Mayanja Nkaji
- Peter Ogwang
- Ngora district
