= Mary Karooro Okurut =

Ugandan politician (1954–2025)

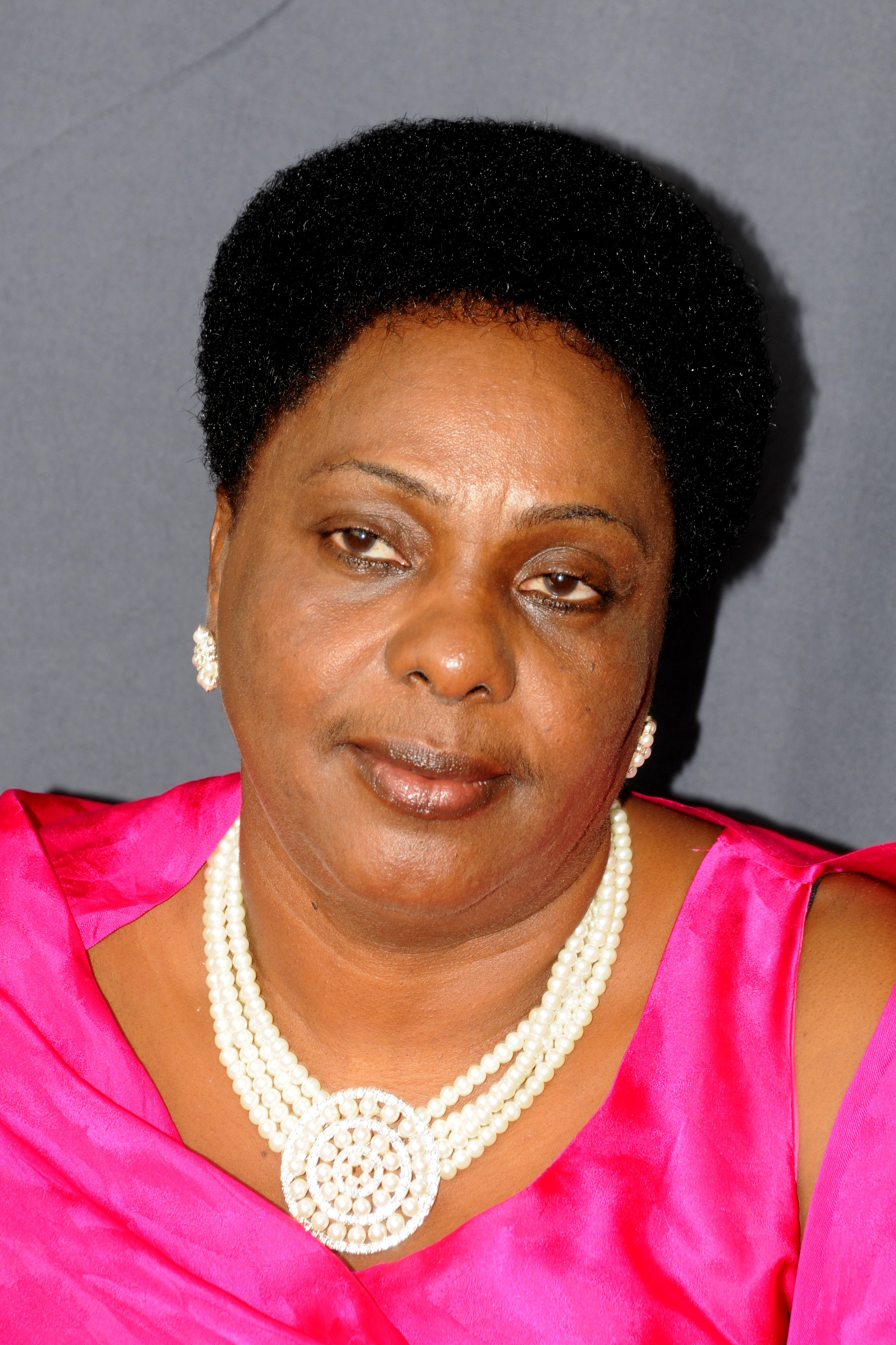
- Born: 12 July 1954; Bushenyi, Protectorate of Uganda
- Died: 11 August 2025 (aged 71); Kampala, Uganda
- Citizenship: Uganda
- Education: Makerere University (BA in English Literature) (MA in English Literature) (Diploma in Education)
- Occupations: Author, educator & politician
- Years active: 1981–2016
- Known for: Politics, Literature
- Title: Cabinet Minister for General Duties in the Office of the Prime Minister of Uganda
- Spouse: Stanislaus Okurut (1983–2014)

Mary Busingye Karooro Okurut (12 July 1954 – 11 August 2025), more commonly known as Mary Karooro Okurut, was a Ugandan educator, author and politician. She was the Cabinet Minister in Charge of General Duties in the Office of the Prime Minister, in the Ugandan Cabinet. She was appointed to that position on 6 June 2016. Prior to that, from 1 March 2015 until 6 June 2016, she served as Cabinet Minister for National Security. She was appointed to that position on 1 March 2015, replacing Wilson Muruli Mukasa, who was appointed Minister of Gender and Social Issues. Between 2012 and 2015, she served as the Minister of Gender and Social Issues in the Cabinet of Uganda. She was appointed to that position in 2012. She replaced Syda Bumba, who resigned from Cabinet. Karooro also served as the elected Member of Parliament for Bushenyi District Women's Constituency. In the 2020 National resistance movement NRM party flag bearer elections, Karooro lost to Annet Katusiime Mugisha, who was elected Bushenyi district woman member of parliament in the 2021 Uganda presidential and parliamentary elections.

== Background and education ==
She was born in Bushenyi District on 8 December 1954. She attended Bweranyangi Primary School and Bweranyangi Girls' Senior Secondary School for her elementary and middle school education, in that order. In 1972, at the age of 18, she entered Trinity College Nabbingo to carry out her high-school education. In 1974, she entered Makerere University, graduating in 1977 with the degree of Bachelor of Arts in Literature (BA.Lit). Three years later, in 1981, she graduated with the degree of Master of Arts in Literature (MA.Lit), also from Makerere University. In 1982, she added the Diploma in Education (Dip.Ed), from the same university.

== Work history ==
Mary Karooro Okurut began lecturing at Makerere, in the Department of Literature in 1981, as soon as she completed her master's degree. She maintained her status as Lecturer, until 1993. She took up employment as the press secretary to the vice-president of Uganda from 1994 until 1996. Between 1996 and 1999 she served as Commissioner, Education Service Commission in the Ugandan Ministry of Education. From 1999 until 2004, she served as the press secretary of the President of Uganda. In 2004, she entered elective Ugandan politics. She served as the woman member of parliament representing Bushenyi District in Ugandan 10th parliament.

== Literary work ==
Prior to her political career, Okurut was perhaps best known for her contributions to Ugandan literature both as a writer and as the founder of the Uganda Women Writers Association (FEMRITE), an organisation that has since received international attention and has to date produced one winner of the Caine Prize, Arach Monica de Nyeko, whose story "Jambula Tree" won in 2007.

Karooro Okurut's literary publications include the novels The Invisible Weevil (1998) (ISBN 9789970901029) and The Official Wife (ISBN 9789970024018). She also edited A Woman's Voice (1998) (ISBN 9789970901036), a collection of short stories by Ugandan women writers. She wrote The Curse of The Sacred Cow.

== Political career ==
In 2004, Mary Karooro Okurut contested the Bushenyi District Women's Constituency on the National Resistance Movement political party ticket. She won and represented that constituency in the Parliament of Uganda until 2021 when she was won in the general elections. She served as Minister of Information and National Guidance from May 2011 until May 2013, when she was reassigned to her current docket. In a cabinet reshuffle on 1 March 2015, she was appointed Security Minister. As of April 2020, Karooro Okurut was the minister for general duties in the office of the prime minister

== Personal life and death ==
Karooro Okurut was married to Stanislaus Okurut until his death on 5 April 2014; together they had eight children – five boys and three girls. She belonged to the Protestant faith.

Karooro Okurut died on 11 August 2025, at the age of 71.

== See also ==
- Cabinet of Uganda
- Parliament of Uganda
- Bushenyi District
- FEMRITE
