= Africa Re =

Nigerian reinsurance company

African Reinsurance Corporation
- Type: African Reinsurance Corporation
- Industry: Financial services
- Founded: 24 February 1976; 50 years ago
- Headquarters: Lagos, Nigeria
- Key people: Corneille Karekezi (CEO) Moustapha Coulibay(Chairman)
- Products: Reinsurance, insurance, asset management
- Revenue: US$1 200.34 million (2024)
- Net income: US$132.94 million (2024)
- Total assets: US$1 884 million (2024)
- Total equity: US$1 159 million (2024)
- Number of employees: 300 (2024)
- Website: Homepage

African Reinsurance Corporation, generally known as Africa Re, is a reinsurance company based in Lagos, Nigeria. Africa Re was founded on 24 February 1976 in Yaoundé, Cameroon making it Africa's first continental reinsurer. The company operates in 41 countries of the African Union through approximately 107 insurance/reinsurance companies.

The creation of the pan-African reinsurer was intended to limit the outflow of foreign currency from Africa and promote the development of the insurance market there. The Yaoundé Agreement also encouraged any national African insurance and/or reinsurance institution to contribute to the company's capital.

== History ==
=== The early days of Africa Re ===
The idea of developing a local insurance and reinsurance market in developing countries was born in the early 1970s within international institutions. Only economically mature countries had companies operating in this sector at the time. In Africa, the obstacles facing the project were numerous, given the continent's lack of human and material resources and its political, economic, cultural and linguistic disparities. It was in this context that Africa Re was established in Yaoundé (Cameroon) on 24 February 1976. Its authorized capital of US$15 million was then shared between the African Development Bank (ADB) and 36 member states of the Organization of African Unity (OAU).

The ambition is to curb the outflow of foreign currency from the continent, mobilize local capital, create a reinsurance market and support African economic development. The company started its activities in Accra (Ghana) before moving, a few months later, to Lagos (Nigeria). In 1980, Africa Re opened its first regional office in Morocco, followed by Kenya (1982) and Côte d'Ivoire (1987).

=== An eventful start ===
The deteriorating socio-economic and political context of the 1980s and 1990s affected business activity on the continent. The structural and monetary adjustment plans imposed by the International Monetary Fund (IMF) threatened companies and weakened the insurance and reinsurance sector.

In response to this situation, the Board of Directors decided in 1990 to increase the capital to US$30 million and to open it to African and foreign companies. Between 1982 and 1993, five other African states, convinced by the project, joined the ranks of State shareholders, whose number went from 36 to 41.

=== The development on an African scale ===
The advent of democracy in South Africa and the country's integration into the OAU in 1994 marked a fresh beginning for Africa Re. The establishment of a contact office in Johannesburg in 1995 gave the company access to the most important African insurance market, which remains its main source of business to this day.

In order to provide the financial resources necessary for the company's expansion, a second capital increase was decided in 1997. The capital increased from 30 to US$50 million. A contact office (transformed into a regional office in 2003) was then opened in 1997 in Mauritius.

The “Africa Re House”, the company's new headquarters, was built in 2000 in the commercial district known as Victoria Island in Lagos. New premises were also built in Abidjan in 2001, in Nairobi in 2003 and in Casablanca in 2005.

The capital was doubled in 2001, reaching US$100 million, to finance the company's development on the continent. To cover Northeast Africa, the Cairo (Egypt) office was created in 2001. This became a regional office in 2004 while the Johannesburg office was established as a subsidiary in the same year.

Between 2004 and 2005, four financial institutions acquired a 20 percent stake in Africa Re; however, it was only in 2010 that the reinsurer reached its pan-African dimension. The threefold increase in capital to US$300 million allowed Africa Re to complete its coverage of the continent. In 2010, a subsidiary was created in Cairo to support the emerging development of Islamic reinsurance, the new company, Africa Retakaful, operating mainly in the MENA region. In 2011, a local office was set up in Ethiopia in order to strengthen the company's presence in the strategic region of East Africa.

=== International expansion ===
Segmentation of risks and their dispersion in space are driving the international development of reinsurers. Through its presence in the African market, Africa Re has attracted foreign companies that wanted to gain a foothold in Africa.

This is how IRB Brasil Re became a shareholder in 2012. This alliance also gave Africa Re operator status in Brazil and the opportunity to expand its operations in Latin America.

The year 2015 marked the entry of two new shareholders, Axa and Fairfax Financial Holdings with a stake of 7.15 percent each.

In 2018, Allianz acquired IRB Brasil's 8 percent stake in Africa Re.

In 2023, Africa Re's turnover exceeded the billion dollar mark for the first time.

== Shareholder's equity and share capital ==
In 2024, the company's shareholder equity amounted to 1 159 million USD, representing a 6.68% increase from 1 065 million USD in 2023. Over a five-year period, shareholder equity increased by 13.96%.

The company, which was set up with a share capital of US$15 million, has carried out several capital increases:

Progression of the company's share capital
Date	Share capital in millions USD
1976	15 (initial)
1990	30
1997	50
2001	100
2010	300 (current)

== Shareholding ==
The launch of Africa Re was the result of an association between the African Development Bank (AfDB) and 36 member states of the Organisation of African Unity (OAU).

- In 1992, 16 years after the company was launched, new countries joined the founding members, bringing the number of state shareholders to 41.
- In the same year (1992), shareholding was extended to insurance companies that are majority owned by African legal entities.
- The year 2001 was an important turning point in the company's history as it opened up to non-African foreign investors. Four development finance institutions (DFIs) acquired a stake in the company's share capital.
  - International Finance Corporation (IFC), a subsidiary of the World Bank
  - Deutsche Investitions- und Entwicklungsgesellschaft (DEG), German investment and development company, member of the KfW banking group
  - FMO, Entrepreneurial Development Bank of the Netherlands
  - Promotion et Participation pour la Coopération (PROPARCO), French development finance institution, member of the French Development Agency Group (AFD)
- In 2012, IRB-Brasil Re became the first non-African reinsurer to become a shareholder of the company. This equity participation helped Africa Re to obtain the status of operator in Brazil, thereby expanding its activities to Latin America.
- In 2015, two new major non-African shareholders joined the company. These were AXA, one of the world's leading insurance companies, and Fairfax Financial Holdings, a Canadian holding company with a strong portfolio in insurance and reinsurance. These two shareholders acquired the shares belonging to the Development Finance Institutions.
- In 2018, Allianz acquired the 8% stake of IRB Brasil in Africa Re.
- As of 31 December 2024, 112 insurance and reinsurance companies on the continent are shareholders of Africa Re, as well as 42 States, the African Development Bank (ADB) and three international groups.
Africa Re shareholdings
1. 112 African insurance and reinsurance companies (34.9%)
2. 42 Member States (33.8%)
3. 3 Non-African investors (22.5%)
4. The African Development Bank (8.17%)
5. Employee Share Ownership (0.72%)

Africa Re shareholdings
Shareholders	Number of shares	Shares %
112 African insurance and reinsurance companies	1 024 091	34.87
42 OAU Member States	991 627	33.77
3 Non-African investors: Fairfax Financial, AXA, and Allianz SE.	660 000	22.47
African Development Bank	240 000	8.17
Employee Share Ownership	21 077	0.72
Total	2 936 795	100.00

== Organization and structures ==
Africa Re's governance is organized around a Board of Directors and a management team with Moustapha Coulibay serving as the Chairman of the group and Dr. Corneille Karekezi as the Group Managing Director and CEO.

== Chairmen and General Managers ==
In its 48 years of business, Africa Re has only had seven changes in the board of directors and four changes in senior management.

Presidency of the Board of Directors (1977-2024)
Chairman of the Board of Directors	Country of origin	Term
Saad Kanouni	Morocco	1977-1983
Come Simbananiye	Burundi	1983-1986
Ezzat Abdel Bary	Egypt	1986-1992
Eugene Okwor	Nigeria	1992-1995
Musa El Naas	Libya	1995-2013
Hassan Boubrik	Morocco	2013-2021
Mohamed Ahmed Maait	Egypt	2021-2024
Moustapha Coulibay	Côte d’Ivoire	2024 to date

General Management (1977-2024)
General Manager	Term
Edward Mensah	1977-1984
Eyessus Work Zafu	1984-1993
Bakary Kamara	1993-2011
Dr. Corneille Karekezi	2011 to date

== Main activities ==
The company's portfolio consists of facultative treaties and risks in both life and non-life classes of business. The non-life activity is dominated by fire and accident. In 2024, these two classes of business account for nearly 44% of the portfolio, that is, US$533.48 million of premiums.

== Geographical organization ==
Africa Re's geographical organization is presented as follows in 2024:

- One Head office in Lagos (Nigeria);
- Three subsidiaries: Africa Re South Africa in Johannesburg (South Africa), Africa Retakaful in Cairo (Egypt) and Africa Re Underwriting Agency Limited in Dubai (United Arab Emirates Dubai);
- Six regional offices: Casablanca (Morocco), Abidjan ( Côte d'Ivoire), Nairobi (Kenya), Lagos (Nigeria), Cairo (Egypt) and Ebene (Mauritius);
- Two local offices in Addis Ababa (Ethiopia) and Khartoum (Sudan);
- One underwriting representative in Kampala (Uganda).

== Financial and technical data ==
Financial data (in thousands USD) (2020-2024)
	2020	2021	2012	2023	2024
Turnover	804 774	845 346	951 789	1 106 487	1 214 098
Reinsurance revenue	-	-	-	1 045 000	1 200 350
Net result	55 709	38 823	59 873	126 954	132 942
Shareholder’s equity	1 017 106	1 000 714	998 986	1 065 691	1 158 834
Total assets	1 836 676	1 890 613	1 498 895	1 649 543	1 884 232
Return on equity (ROE)	5.48%	3.88%	6.05%	11.91%	11.47%

Technical data (2020-2024)
	2020	2021	2022	2023	2024
Loss ratio	61.79%	58.82%	60.18%	60.10%	56.40%
Expense Ratio	36.06%	36%	34.27%	33.41%	34.49%
Combined ratio	97.85%	94.82%	94.45%	93.51%	90.89%

Portfolio in 2024 (amounts in millions USD)
Region	Premiums	Share
East Africa	231.41	19.28%
Southern Africa	152.14	12.68%
English-speaking West Africa	102.27	8.52%
French-speaking West and Central Africa	165.28	17.77%
International Business	331.49	27.62%
Maghreb	85.38	7.11%
North East Africa	39.19	3.26%
Indian Ocean Islands	40.09	3.34%
Retakaful Africa activity	53.09	4.42%
Total	1 200.34	100%

== The Africa Re Foundation ==
=== History ===
In 2014, Africa Re established a fund to finance corporate social responsibility (CSR) projects. This initiative follows a November 2013 board of directors' decision that allocated up to 2% of the annual net profit to CSR projects in the 41 member States.

The Africa Re Foundation was created on 19 January 2018 to steer this fund, which was initially managed internally. The new entity, based in Mauritius and operational since January 2019, is responsible for managing the fund and ensuring the implementation of the various CSR projects.

=== Governance of the foundation ===
The Africa Re Foundation's Board of Directors is made up of insurance professionals. They are chosen to ensure fair representation of all regions of the continent.

=== Objectives of the Africa Re Foundation ===
The development of insurance on the continent is one of Africa Re's objectives. The foundation, in charge of conveying this ideal, contributes to the financing of corporate social responsibility projects by:

- Granting subsidies and carrying out activities that contribute to the growth of insurance, the promotion of risk management solutions and the development of regional and continental partnerships;
- Raising awareness of major risks that could hamper the economic development of member countries;
- Supporting innovation and research for the development of new risk prevention mechanisms;
- Supporting the training and development of young insurance professionals in African markets.

== See also ==
- Swiss Re
- Kenya Re
- African Development Bank
