= Wilson Muruli Mukasa =

Ugandan politician (born 1952)

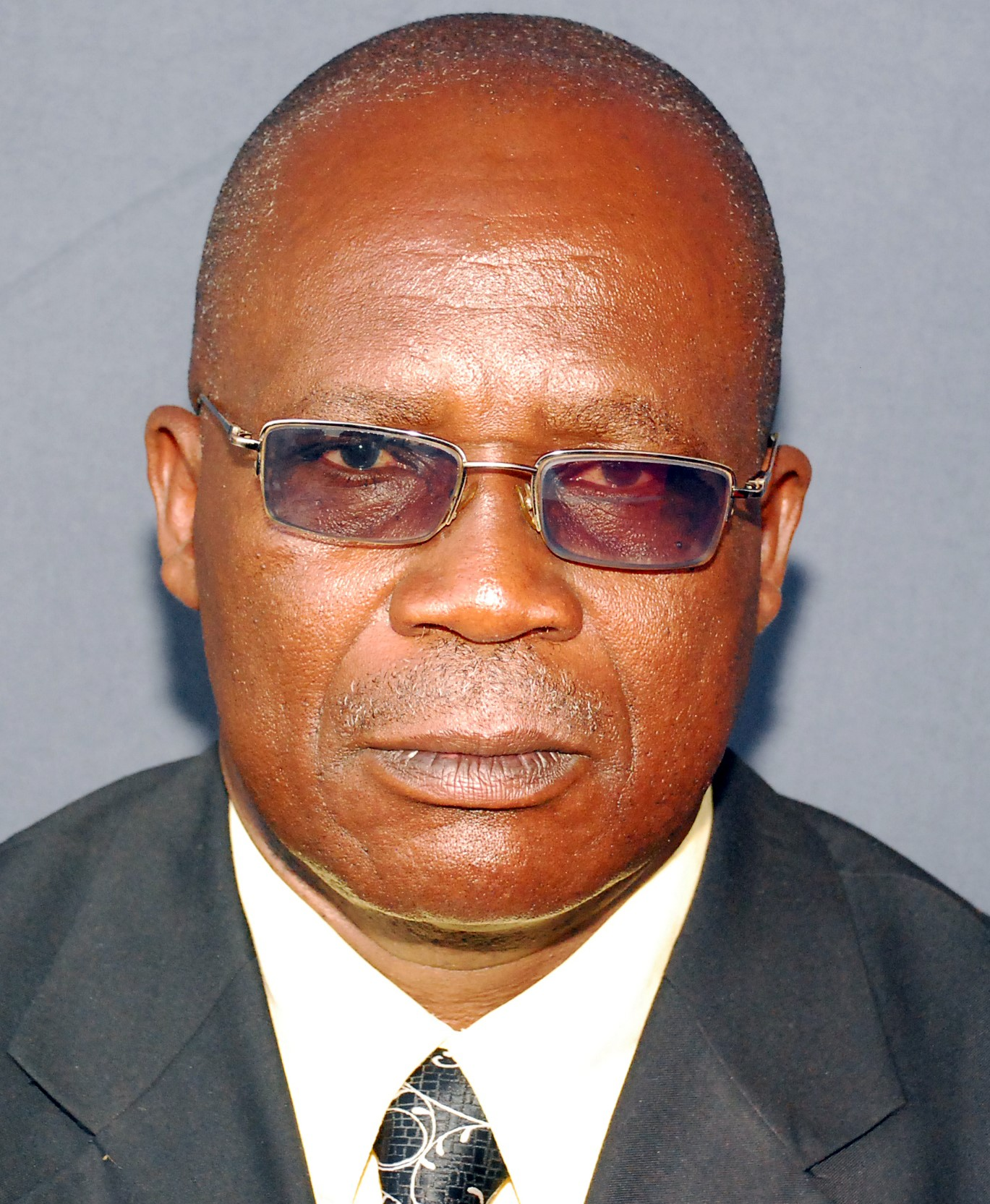
- Born: 5 July 1952 (age 74); Uganda
- Citizenship: Uganda
- Education: Makerere University (BA with Diploma in Education); Institution in Tripoli (Certificate in Hotel Management)
- Occupations: Educator and politician
- Years active: 1988–present
- Known for: Politics
- Title: Minister for Security

Wilson Muruli Mukasa (born 5 July 1952) is a Ugandan politician. He has been Cabinet Minister of Public Service in the Ugandan Cabinet since 6 June 2016. He has previously served as Cabinet Minister of Gender and Social Issues from 1 March 2015, until 6 June 2016. Previously he served as Minister of Security from 27 May 2011 until 1 March 2015. Muruli Mukasa also serves as the Member of Parliament for Budyebo County in Nakasongola District.

== Early life and education ==
Wilson Muruli was born in Nakasongola District on 5 July 1952. He attend local elementary and secondary schools. He studied at Makerere University earning the combined degree/diploma of Bachelor of Arts with the Diploma in Education (BA.Dip.Ed.) in 1975. In 1987, he earned the Certificate in Hotel Management, from an undisclosed institution in Tripoli, Libya.

== Career ==
For eleven years, from 1975 until 1986, Muruli Mukasa was a teacher; for the last two years he was the principal of the school where he taught. Since 1989, he has been a member of parliament, representing his home constituency. He was appointed Minister of Security in May 2011. He replaced Amama Mbabazi, who was appointed Prime Minister of Uganda. In addition to his docket of Security, Mukasa has served as Minister for Kampala, before a substantive minister was appointed in 2011, and in 2014, when the line Minister, Frank Tumwebaze, took a leave of absence. In a cabinet reshuffle on 1 March 2015, he was transferred to the post of Minister of Gender and Social Issues, replacing Mary Karooro Okurut, who was named Minister for Security. On 6 June 2016, he was named Cabinet Minister for Public Service, in the cabinet list announced that day.

== See also ==
- Cabinet of Uganda
- Parliament of Uganda
- Nakasongola District
