= Ministry of Works and Transport (Uganda) =

Government ministry of Uganda

Coordinates: 00°18′48″N 32°34′55″E

- Coat of Arms of Uganda

Ministry overview
- Type: Ministry
- Jurisdiction: Government of Uganda
- Headquarters: Old Port Bell Road; Kampala, Uganda
- Ministry executive: Monica Azuba Ntege, Minister of Works and Transport
- Website: Homepage

The Ministry of Works and Transport is a Cabinet level government ministry of Uganda, that is mandated to plan, develop and maintain an economic, efficient and effective transport infrastructure, and transport services by road, rail, water, and air. The ministry is also mandated to manage public works including government structures and promote standards in the construction industry. The ministry is headed by a cabinet minister. The current Minister of Works and Transport is Katumba Wamala.

== Location ==
The headquarters of the ministry are located at the corner of Jinja Road and Old Port Bell Road, in Kampala Central Division, in the Industrial Area of Kampala, the capital and largest city in the country. The coordinates of the ministry headquarters are:0°19'04.0"N, 32°35'48.0"E (Latitude: 0.317779; Longitude: 32.596681).

== Overview ==
As of July, the ministry is involved, through and with its affiliated entities, in several major construction projects including the following:

- Construction of Entebbe–Kampala Expressway. The 53 kilometres (33 mi) links Entebbe International Airport with Kampala Northern Bypass Road and with the Kampala neighborhood of Munyonyo, on the northern shores of Lake Victoria. The expressway will have toll booths with limited access.
- Expansion and improvement of Entebbe International Airport. The multi-phased expansion is slated to last until 2033 and involves the expansion of the cargo terminal, construction of a new passenger terminal building, construction of new fuel storage facilities, building new multi-story car park, construction of new control tower and strengthening and resealing of current runways. The entire renovation budget is approximately US$586 million.
- Expansion of Kampala Northern Bypass Highway to dual carriageway.
- Construction of Malaba–Kampala Standard Gauge Railway.
- Construction of the New Nile Bridge at Njeru.

== Subministries ==
- State Minister for Works - General Katumba Wamala
- State Minister for Transport - Aggrey Bagiire

== Auxiliary institutions and allied agencies ==
- Civil Aviation Authority of Uganda
- Uganda National Roads Authority
- Uganda Road Fund
- Rift Valley Railways
- Kampala Capital City Authority

== List of ministers ==
- Katumba Wamala (14 December 2019 - present)
- Monica Azuba Ntege (6 June 2016 - 14 December 2019)
- John Byabagambi (1 March 2015 - 6 June 2016)
- Abraham Byandala (27 May 2011 - 1 March 2015)
- John Nasasira (1996 - 27 May 2011)

== See also ==
- Transport in Uganda
- Government of Uganda
- Cabinet of Uganda
- List of roads in Uganda
