= Kenya Reinsurance Corporation =

Kenyan reinsurance company

- Type: Public
- Traded as: KN: KNRE
- Industry: Reinsurance, Insurance
- Founded: 1 January 1971; 55 years ago
- Headquarters: Nairobi, Kenya
- Key people: Hon. Catherine Kimura; Chairperson of the Board; Hillary M. Wachinga, PhD; Managing Director
- Revenue: ▲KES: 22.1 billion (2019)
- Net income: ▲KES: 4.2 billion (2019)
- Total assets: ▲KES: 50.4 billion (2019)
- Total equity: ▲KES: 31.95 billion (2019)
- Website: Homepage

Kenya Reinsurance Corporation Limited, commonly referred to as Kenya Re, is a reinsurance company based in Nairobi, Kenya.

== Overview ==
Kenya Re is the oldest reinsurer in Eastern and Central Africa and serves over 265 insurance companies in 62 countries across Africa, the Middle East and Asia with over 50 percent of its revenue being generated from foreign markets. The firm provides reinsurance products to both life and general insurance. Kenya Re is listed on the Nairobi Securities Exchange.

== History ==
Kenya Reinsurance Corporation was established through an Act of Parliament in December 1970. The firm commenced reinsurance business in January 1971. Kenya Re launched its IPO in 2007 leading to the government cutting its stake in the reinsurer.

== Ownership ==
The shares of the stock of Kenya Reinsurance Corporation are traded on the Nairobi Securities Exchange, under the symbol: KNRE. As of 31 December 2014, the shareholding in the group's stock was as depicted in the table below:

Kenya Reinsurance Corporation Stock Ownership
Rank	Name of Owner	Percentage Ownership
1	National Treasury of Kenya	60.00
2	Others	40.00
	Total	100.00

== Governance ==
Kenya Re is governed by an eleven-person Board of Directors with Hon. Catherine Kimura serving as the Chairperson of the Board of Directors and Dr. Hillary M. Wachinga as the Managing Director.

== See also ==
- List of Insurance companies in Kenya
- Nairobi Securities Exchange
- Africa Re
