= National Insurance Corporation =

Ugandan insurance company

National Insurance Corporation (NIC)
- Company type: Public: USE: NIC
- Industry: Financial services
- Founded: 1964; 62 years ago
- Headquarters: Kampala, Uganda
- Key people: Martin Aliker; Chairman; Elias Edu; Managing Director
- Products: Insurance, banking, investments
- Revenue: ▲USh 1.9 billion after tax (2017)
- Total assets: USh 108 billion (2017)
- Website: Homepage

National Insurance Corporation Limited, commonly referred to as National Insurance Corporation (NIC), is an insurance company in Uganda. The company is a leading provider of insurance and risk management services in the country.

== Overview ==
NIC, one of the licensed insurance companies in the country, is a medium-sized insurance services provider in Uganda. As of December 2017, the company's total assets were valued at USh 108 billion (approximately US$30 million). During the year that ended December 2017, the company realized USh 1.9 billion (approximately US$520,000) in after-tax profit. At that time, shareholders' equity was calculated at USh 38 billion (approximately US$10.5 million).

== History ==
NIC was established by an Act of Parliament in 1964. Before 2005, all of the company was owned by the Ugandan government. In June 2005, the government divested 60 percent of its shares in NIC. These shares were acquired by Industrial and General Insurance Company Limited of Nigeria. In December 2009, the government began the process of divesting entirely from the company by floating its 40 percent shareholding on the Uganda Securities Exchange.

== Subsidiaries ==
As December 2013, the company had the following subsidiaries:

1. NIC (South Sudan) Limited - Juba, South Sudan - 100 percent shareholding
2. Capital Assets Investment Limited - Kampala, Uganda - 100 percent shareholding
3. Premium Trust Investment (Uganda) Limited - Kampala, Uganda - 100 percent shareholding
4. NIC Trustees and Investment Limited - Kampala, Uganda - 100 percent shareholding

== Ownership ==
Until December 2009, 60 percent of NIC was owned by a consortium called Corporate Holdings Limited. The consortium was owned jointly by Industrial and General Insurance Company Plc (IGI), a Nigerian insurance company (85 percent), and by local businessmen Patrick Bitature and Erik van Veen (15 percent). The remaining 40 percent of NIC, was owned by the government of Uganda.

On 31 December 2009, the Ugandan government started the process to list on the Uganda Securities Exchange (USE) the 161.6 million shares of NIC that it owned. That process concluded on 25 March 2010, when active trading of NIC began on the USE under the symbol NIC. As of 31 December 2017, the ownership of the company was as depicted in the table below:

National Insurance Corporation Stock Ownership
Rank	Name of Owner	Percentage Ownership
1	Corporate Holdings Limited	64.94
2	DFCU Bank	7.00
3	Sudhir Ruparelia	6.96
4	Joseph Tukuratiire & Ketrah Tukuratiire	2.34
5	Ronald Balyejjusa Ssettumba	2.11
6	Rashid Ssenyonga	1.03
7	Timothy Sabiiti Mutebile	0.84
8	Mundu Abala Joseph (ITF Abala Brian)	0.60
9	BID Insurance Brokers Uganda Limited	0.53
10	Biao Wang	0.50
11	Individual and Institutional Investors on the USE	13.10
	Total	100.00

== Branch network ==
The company has branches in the following Ugandan towns: Arua, Busia, Fort Portal, Gulu, Jinja, Kapchorwa, Kasese, Lira, Mbarara, Malaba, Masaka, Masindi, and Mbale. In addition, NIC has a branch in Juba, South Sudan.

== Products and services ==
NIC's products and services list includes the following:

- Marine and Aviation
- Engineering and Contractor
- All Risks Insurance
- Group Personal Accident
- Workers Compensation
- Employer’s Liability
- Motor Insurance
- Fire and Allied Perils
- Theft/Burglary
- All Risks
- Cash In Transit
- Fidelity Guarantee
- Goods in Transit
- Public & Products Liability
- Professional Indemnity
- Computer and Electronics
- Estate Fire Insurance
- Estate Comprehensive
- Group Credit/Microfinance Credit
- Whole Life & Endowment
- Term Insurance
- Mortgage Care
- Children's Endorsement
- Key Man's Insurance
- NIC Group Pension
- Death In Service Benefit
- Lump Sum Savings Plan
- Medical Express Insurance
- School Fees Insurance Scheme
- Microfinance Care
- Travel Health Plus
- Travel Personal Accident
- Travel Health Insurance
- Personal Pension and Annuity-Plus Plan
- Dividend Plus Plan
- Leasecare Policy
- Integrated Benefit Plan

== Governance ==
The governing body of the company is the nine-member board of directors. Martin Aliker, one of the non-executive board members, is the acting chairman. The chief executive officer in acting capacity, is Elias Edu, following the promotion of Bayo Folayan, the previous managing director to Group Managing Director.

== See also ==
- Banking in Uganda
- Economy of Uganda
- List of insurance companies in Uganda
