= Kalagala =

- Map of Uganda showing the location of Kalagala.
- Coordinates: 00°36′47″N 32°36′56″E
- Country: Uganda
- Region: Central Uganda
- District: Luweero District
- Elevation: 1,160 m (3,810 ft)
- Time zone: UTC+3 (EAT)

Kalagala is a town in Central Uganda. It is one of the metropolitan areas in Luweero District. Other towns in the district include: Bamunanika, Bombo, Luweero, Wobulenzi and Ziroobwe.

== Location ==
Kalagala is located approximately 15 kilometres (9.3 mi), by road, northeast of Bombo, the nearest large town. This location lies approximately 46 kilometres (29 mi), by road, northeast of Kampala, the largest city in Uganda and the capital of that country. The coordinates of the town are:00 36 47N, 32 36 56E (Latitude:0.6130; Longitude:32.6105).

== Population ==
The exact population of Kalagala is not known, as of November 2010.

== Landmarks ==
The landmarks within the town limits or close to the edges of town include:

- The offices of Kalagala Town Council
- The offices of Kalagala sub-county
- Kalagala Central Market
- The Main Campus of Bugema University - Located in Kalagala sub-county on Gayaza-Ziroobwe Road.
- The Fisher Branch Kalagala High School - A mixed, residential, private high school with enrollment of over 40
- 0 students.

== See also ==
- Luweero District
- Luweero Triangle
- Central Region, Uganda
