= Lillian Nakate =

Ugandan civil engineer and politician

- Born: 11 August 1978 (age 48); Wobulenzi, Uganda
- Education: Kyambogo University (Diploma in Architectural Draftsmanship); Makerere University (BSc in Civil Engineering) (MSc in Civil Engineering)
- Occupations: Civil engineer and politician
- Years active: 2000 to present
- Title: Member of Parliament for Luweero District Women' Constituency

Lillian Nakate Segujja (born 11 August 1978) commonly Lillian Nakate, is a Ugandan civil engineer and politician who served as the Member of Parliament representing the Luweero District Women' Constituency in the 10th Parliament of Uganda (2016 to 2021).

== Early life and education ==
Nakate was born in Wobulenzi, Luweero District, in the Central Region of Uganda, on 11 August 1978. Her parents are the late Francis Segujja and Annet Segujja. She attended Wobulenzi Parents' School for her elementary schooling. She went to multiple schools for her secondary education, including Saint John's Secondary School in Nandere, Luweero District, Mulusa Academy Secondary School, in Wobulenzi, finishing out at Luteete Secondary School in Bamunanika, where she sat her O-Level examinations. She then went back to Mulusa Academy for her A-Level education.

She enrolled in Uganda Polytechnic Kyambogo, which later became a component of Kyambogo University, where she studied for a Diploma in Architectural Draftsmanship, graduating in 2000. In 2007, she graduated from Makerere University, Uganda's largest and oldest public university, with a Bachelor of Science (BSc) degree in Civil Engineering. She followed that up with a Master of Science (MSc) degree in the same field, at the same university, graduating in 2011. She also holds a Certificate in Project Planning and Management, awarded by the Institute of Statistics and Applied Economics at Makerere University, in 2008. Her Certificate in Financial and Business Management of Road Construction was awarded in 2013, by Multitech Business School in Kampala, Uganda's capital city.

== Career ==
=== Beginnings ===
Nakate first worked as a draftsman and site clerk at the Kampala, Uganda offices of Tectura International Planners, Architects and Project Managers, where she worked for one year, from 2000 until 2001. She then worked as an Assistant Engineering Officer for Luweero District Local Government for a five-year period, from 2001 until 2006. In 2007, she was appointed as the Town Engineer for Wobulenzi Town Council, serving in that capacity for the next four years. During that time, she concurrently served as the Acting District Engineer for Luweero District.

In 2011, she went back into the private sector as the Resident Engineer for Bestway General Contractors, an international construction company with operations in Uganda. In 2012, she relocated to Parrot 50 Uganda Limited, serving as the Director responsible for engineering, until 2016. During the same time frame she concurrently served as Consultant Civil Engineer at UB Consulting Engineers Limited, an indigenous professional consulting engineering firm.

=== Political career ===
In 2016, Nakate joined elective Ugandan politics by contesting for the Luweero District Women's Constituency, on the National Resistance Movement political party. She was elected, defeating Brenda Nabukenya of the Democratic Party (Uganda). In the 10th Parliament, Nakate is a member of the parliamentary committee on science and technology and is the deputy chairperson of the parliamentary committee on physical infrastructure.

== Personal life ==
Lillian Nakate is a married mother of three, including a set of twins, born circa 2007 and a sibling, born one year later.

== See also ==
- Monica Azuba Ntege
- Winnie Kiiza
- Ruth Nankabirwa
