= Kalule =

Kalule Kalule Municipality
- Location of Kalule in Uganda
- Coordinates: 00°38′24″N 32°31′48″E
- Country: Uganda
- Region: Central Uganda
- District: Luweero District
- Elevation: 3,870 ft (1,180 m)

Kalule is a town in Luweero District in Central Uganda.

== Location ==
Kalule located approximately 38 kilometres (24 mi), by road, north of Kampala, Uganda's capital and largest city, on the highway to Masindi. The coordinates of the town are: 00 38 24N, 32 31 48E (Latitude:0.6400; Longitude:32.5300).

== Overview ==
Kalule is one of the municipalities in Luweero District, the others being:

- Bamunanika - About 13 kilometres (8.1 mi), northeast of Kalule.
- Bombo - About 10 kilometres (6.2 mi), south of Kalule.
- Luweero - The district headquarters, about 31 kilometres (19 mi), north of Kalule.
- Kalagala - About 9.5 kilometres (5.9 mi), southeast of Kalule
- Wobulenzi - About 13 kilometres (8.1 mi), north of Kalule
- Ziroobwe - About 22.5 kilometres (14.0 mi), east of Kalule.

Kalule is a rapidly expanding metropolitan area. It is a market town that attracts agricultural produce from farmers in Bbowa, Katende and Kayindu. There are large pig farms in Kwese, a suburb of Kalule. Merchandise that does not find market in Kalule is sent to markets farther south, including to Kampala, the largest city in Uganda, and the capital of the country.

== Population ==
The population of Kalule is not publicly known, as of November 2010.

== Landmarks ==
In Kalule or near the town there are several landmarks, including the following:

- The offices of Kalule Town Council
- Kalule Central Market
- The Kampala-Masindi Highway - the highway traverses the town in a north - south direction
- The Kalule-Bamunanika Road - the road makes a T-junction with the Kampala-Masindi Highway at Kalule and continues east to Bamunanika, the location of one of the palaces of the Kabaka of Buganda.

== See also ==
- Luweero District
- Bamunanika
- Bombo
- Luweero
- Kalagala
- Wobulenzi
- Ziroobwe
- Luwero Triangle
- Central Uganda
