= Bamunanika =

- Map of Uganda showing the location of Bamunanika
- Coordinates: 00°41′15″N 32°36′31″E
- Country: Uganda
- Region: Central Uganda
- District: Luweero District
- Constituency: Bamunanika County
- Time zone: UTC+3 (EAT)

Bamunanika, whose correct phonetic spelling is Baamunaanika is a town in, Luweero District in Central Uganda.

== Location ==
Bamunanika is located approximately 52 kilometres (32 mi), by road, north of Kampala, Uganda's capital and largest city. The coordinates of the town are:00 41 15N, 32 36 31E (Latitude:-0.6875; Longitude:32.6085).

== Overview ==
Bamunanika is the hometown of Dr. John C. Muyingo, He is the current State Minister for Higher Education in the Ugandan Cabinet (2011–Present). Dr. Muyingo is the Patron of Bamunanika Constituency Education Fund (BACEF), which gives scholarships to less privileged children in Bamunanika who cannot afford school fees. Bamunanika Parliamentary Constituency consists of five sub-counties; namely: Kalagala, Zirobwe, Kikyusa, Bamunanika and Kamira.

== Towns in Luweero District ==
Bamunanika is one of the towns in Luweero District. The other towns in the district include the following:

- Bombo
- Kalagala
- Kalule
- Luweero - The location of the district headquarters, approximately 29 kilometres (18 mi), by road, northwest of Bamunanika
- Wobulenzi
- Ziroobwe

== Population ==
Bamunanika Parliamentary Constituency has a population of about 390,000 people of whom approximately 200,000 are voters. However the human population of Bamunanika Town, is not publicly known as of March 2014.

== Landmarks ==
The landmarks within the town limits or near the town include:

- The offices of Bamunanika Town Council
- The Bamunanika Palace - One of the palaces of the Kabaka of Buganda.
- Bamunanika Central Market

== See also ==
- Luweero District
- Kabaka of Buganda
- John Chrysostom Muyingo
