= Brian Mululi Mayanja =

Ugandan footballer (born 1996)

Personal information
- Date of birth: 27 February 1996
- Place of birth: Uganda
- Date of death: 19 October 2024 (aged 28)
- Place of death: Kasana Hospital, Luwero District, Uganda
- Position: Attacking midfielder

Youth career
- Nakasongola Army School

College career
Years	Team	Apps	(Gls)
- Kampala University (Luwero)

Senior career*
Years	Team	Apps	(Gls)
- Bright Stars FC
- Soana
- BUL
- Police FC
- Lweza
- Dove
- Nyamityobora FC
2020–2021	Kitara		
2022–2023	Jinja North United		
2023	Mbarara City		
- Africa Lyon
- Mtibwa Sugar
2024	Buhimba United Saints		
- * Club domestic league appearances and goals

Brian Mululi Mayanja (born 27 February 1996) was a Ugandan footballer who played as an attacking midfielder for Buhimba United Saints.

== Education and early football ==
Muyanja's football career developed while he was still a student at Nakasongola Army School where he represented the school in the National Post Primary School competitions. He also attended to Kampala University (Luwero) and played for the University in the regional league.

== Club career ==
Muyanja played for Bright Stars in the Uganda premier league before joining Soana FC. He subsequently played for Bul FC before playing for Police FC. He went on to play for Lweza FC followed by Dove FC and Nyamityobora FC.

From 2020 to 2021, he played for Kitara FC. In the 2022 - 2023 season, Muyanja played for Jinja North United before joining Mbarara City in 2023 for a brief spell. He later moved to Tanzania where he played for Africa Lyon and Mtibwa Sugar. In 2024, Muyanja joined Buhimba United Saints where he played in the FUFA Big League.

== Achievements ==
Muyanja was named as the Pilsner Uganda Premier League Player of the Month for February 2021.

== Death ==
Muyanja died on 19 October 2024 at Kasana Hospital in Luwero district after becoming ill.
