= Ziroobwe–Wobulenzi Road =

Road in Uganda

Coordinates: 00°41′50″N 32°36′20″E

Route information
- Length: 16 mi (26 km)
- History: Designation in 2016 (expected); Completion in 2017 (expected)

Major junctions
- East end: Ziroobwe
- Bamunanika
- West end: Wobulenzi

Location
- Country: Uganda

Highway system
- Roads in Uganda

Ziroobwe–Wobulenzi Road is a road in Central Uganda, connecting the towns of Ziroobwe to Bamunanika and Wobulenzi, all in Luweero District.

== Location ==
The road starts at Ziroobwe, approximately 51 kilometres (32 mi) north of Kampala, Uganda's capital and largest city. The road goes in a general westward direction through Bamunanika to end at Wobulenzi, on the Kampala–Gulu Highway, a total distance of approximately 25 kilometres (16 mi).

== Overview ==
As far back as 2008, when the Gayaza–Ziroobwe Road was designated, the Ugandan government planned to tarmac the Ziroobwe–Wobulenzi Road. In June 2014, the Uganda National Roads Authority (UNRA) carried out an assessment to determine the individuals, families and businesses who would be displaced by the road works, with a view to compensate them. As at November 2014, the project was still in "preparation" stage.

== Points of interest ==
The following points of interest lie along or near the road:

- The town of Ziroobwe, with estimated night-time population of 5,000 in 2012
- The Bamunanika Place of the Kabaka of Buganda is located in Bamunanika town.
- Gayaza–Ziroobwe Road joins Ziroobwe–Wobulenzi Road in the middle of Ziroobwe town.
- The town of Wobulenzi, located approximately 50 kilometres (31 mi) north of Kampala, along the Kampala–Gulu Highway
- The western end of this road at Wobulenzi lies approximately

3 kilometres (2 mi) south of Katikamu SDA Secondary School, a mixed boarding secondary school.

== See also ==
- List of roads in Uganda
- Transport in Uganda
