= Ugachick Limited =

Poultry company in Uganda

Coordinates: 00°29′23″N 32°36′13″E

- Type: Private
- Industry: Poultry industry
- Founded: 1991
- Headquarters: Magigye, Uganda
- Key people: Aga Ssekalaala Sr; Chairman; Aga Ssekalaala Jr; Executive Director
- Products: Chicken meat, chicks, eggs, chicken feed, broilers
- Website: http://www.ugachick.co/

Ugachick Limited, whose complete name is Ugachick Poultry Breeders Uganda Limited, but is commonly referred to as Ugachick, is a poultry breeding and marketing company in Uganda. Its operations include breeding farms, a hatchery, broiler production, feed manufacturing and chicken processing.

== Location ==
The company offices and poultry farm are located in the village of Magigye, approximately 5 kilometres (3 mi), north of Gayaza on the Gayaza–Ziroobwe Road. This is 23 kilometres (14 mi) north of Kampala, the capital and largest city in the country. The coordinates of the company headquarters are: 0°29'23.0"N, 32°36'13.0"E (Latitude:0.489722; Longitude:32.603615).

Ugachick supplies the Ugandan market and has exported poultry products and day-old chicks to neighbouring countries, including the Democratic Republic of the Congo, Rwanda and Burundi. Its fish feed has also been sold in regional markets, including Kenya and Tanzania.

== Overview ==
Ugachick Limited was established in 1991 and began operations in 1992. The business is divided into five divisions:

1. Feed Mill - Supplies feeds to other divisions in the business and other farmers in Uganda and the region
2. Parent Stock Farm - Adult layer birds for laying eggs
3. Hatchery - For hatching of chicks for sale
4. Broiler Farm - Raising adult birds for meat
5. Processing plant - Prepares chicken meat for sale in Ugandan supermarkets and other customers in neighbouring countries

Ugachick is a Halal-certified company by the Uganda Muslim Supreme Council.
