= Grace Nakibaala =

Ugandan innovator

Grace Nakibala
- Born: 1990 (age 35–36); Uganda
- Education: Makerere University
- Known for: PedalTap, EpiTent

Grace Nakibala (born 1990) is a Ugandan innovator who is the founder of PedalTap company.

== Education ==
She attended Gayaza High School for her secondary education after which she joined the College of Engineering Design Art and Technology (CEDAT) at Makerere University for a Bachelor of science in Architecture.

== Professional life ==
Grace Nakibala is the team leader of the PedalTap innovation, which is a hands-free, foot-operated water-dispensing device designed to reduce the spread of infectious disease and save water. She is also the creator of "EpiTent", a semi-permanent structure used during humanitarian emergencies.

== Achievements and honors ==
Grace Nakibala has won a number of awards and represented PedalTap at the Next Einstein Forum Global Gathering in 2018

- Team lead PedalTap Innovation
- Winner of Africa Innovation Challenge in 2017
- Winner of the Johnson and Johnson award in March 2017
