= Sarah Babirye Kityo =

Ugandan politician (born 1986)

- Born: 27 December 1986 (age 39); Mukono, Uganda
- Citizenship: Uganda
- Education: SDA Primary School; Mulusa Academy; Uganda Christian University (Public Administration and Management)
- Occupations: Politician and business owner
- Years active: 2011–present
- Known for: Politics, sports and charity work
- Title: Member of Parliament, President Uganda Netball Federation.
- Political party: National Resistance Movement
- Children: 2

Sarah Babirye Kityo (born 27 December 1986) is a Ugandan politician, currently a Member of Parliament Bukoto East (Masaka) and the former elected Youth Representative for Central Region in Uganda's 10th Parliament. She is a member of the National Resistance Movement on whose ticket she ran on in the 2016 Ugandan general election defeating Arthur Katongole, an independent candidate. She is also the current president for the Uganda Netball Federation, a position she assumed in 2021 and serving up to 2025. She is also the current NRM flag bearer of Bukoto East. She is the 2024 Blueprint for Free Speech Award winner, which she was given in recognition of fighting corruption in the Ugandan sports sector.

== Background and education ==
She attended Luweero SDA Primary School. She then attended Mulusa Academy, Wobulenzi for both her O-Levels (UCE) and A-Levels (UACE). In 2015, she graduated with a First-Class Bachelor of Public Administration and Management degree from Uganda Christian University.

== Career ==
The timeline of her political career is as follows:

- 2005–2006: Mobiliser, Office of the Resident District Commissioner, Wakiso District Local Government.
- 2006–2011: Youth Female Councillor and Chairperson for National Resources and Production, Mukono District Local Government.
- 2011–2015: Facilitator, National Youth Council.
- 2016–present: Youth Representative, Central Region in the 10th Parliament of Uganda.

In 2016, along with four other Ugandan Youth members of parliament, Sarah Babirye represented Uganda at the International Young Leaders Assembly (IYLA) at the United Nations Headquarters in New York.

In 2017, she represented Uganda as a keynote speaker at the Commonwealth Parliamentary Association Youth Program (CPA) celebration of Commonwealth Day 2017 in London.

- 2021–present: She became the flag bearer of the National Resistance Movement party Bukoto East.
- 2021–present: She was elected by the netball delegates in most of Ugandan district to become the president of the Uganda Netball Federation. Under her leadership in the 2022 Fast five netball games, Uganda beat Australia to become the number one netball team.

== Committees, membership, and appointments ==
- Member – Appointed in 2018 to an Eight Member Select Committee to Investigate Cases of Sexual Harassment in Learning Institutions.
- Member – Committee on HIV/AIDS and Related Diseases.
- Member – Committee on Health.
- Member – Committee on East African Affairs.
- Member – Uganda Women Parliamentary Association (UWOPA).

== Personal life ==
Sarah Babirye Kityo is married and a mother of two.

She has participated in all the East African Community (EAC) Inter-Parliamentary Games tournaments (2016–2019), and she has helped the Uganda Women Parliamentary team win several accolades:

- 2016 in Mombasa, Kenya – She was the Best Netball Shooter and Best Volleyball Setter.
- 2017 in Dar-es-Salaam, Tanzania – She was the Best Netball Shooter.
- 2018 in Bujumbura, Burundi – She was the Best Netball Shooter.
- 2019 in Kampala, Uganda – She participated in Volleyball, Basketball, Netball and Gold disciplines was the Best Netball Shooter as well as the Overall Gold Winner of the tournament.

== See also ==
- Helen Nakimuli
- Jesca Ababiku
