= Victoria Mwaka =

Ugandan geography professor

- Born: Victoria Mwaka; Luwero district
- Citizenship: Ugandan
- Education: PhD in Geography, Makerere University,
- Notable work: First Female and Geographer to hold a PhD in Uganda
- Political party: National Resistance Movement
- Spouse: Abel Walwasa Mwaka Deceased in 2016

Victoria Mwaka is a Ugandan geography professor, politician and women's-rights activist based in Luweero district, Uganda.

== Background and education ==
She was born in Makulubita in Luweero District. She is a teacher, professor and politician. She holds a PhD in Geography attained from Makerere University.

== Career before politics ==
She started teaching in 1969 and she became an Assistant lecturer, Associate professor of geography and later headed the Geography Department at Makerere University twice from 1975. She became a professor of Geography in 1991 making her the first Female and Geographer to hold a PhD. She spearheaded the establishment of the school of women and gender studies and directed the program until she became the Deputy Chairperson of the Constituent Assembly between 1994 and 1995. She was the lead researcher in the Liberia research study.

== Political career ==
She joined politics in 1996 when she emerged as winner as the women representative member of parliament for Luweero District and officially retired from active politics in 2011

== Personal life ==
She was married to Abel Mwaka who passed on in 2016. Her career started as a teacher in 1969 and in 1993 she founded Victoria Model Secondary School in Luweero Town Council to offer affordable education for the girl-child. She was also nominated as the Head of Hospital Management Committee for Luweero District and was approved by the Luweero District council.
