= Deborah Kasente =

Ugandan feminist academic

- Born: Deborah Hope Kasente; Uganda
- Education: Makerere University Kenyatta University
- Employer: Makerere University
- Known for: Co-founding the School of Women and Gender Studies at Makerere University

Deborah Hope Kasente is a Ugandan writer and academic who focusses on women's rights. She is the co-founder of the School of Women and Gender Studies at Makerere University.

== Education ==
Kasente has degrees in education and English from Makerere University and obtained a PhD from Kenyatta University where she studied educational psychology.

== Career ==
Kasente works as an associate professor of women and gender studies at Makerere University and is the chair of the Uganda Association of University Women.

In 1985 she attended the Third United Nations Women’s Conference in Nairobi. At the conference, she made plans with Eleanor Maxine Ankrah and Victoria Mwaka to elevate the status of women in Uganda. They returned to Uganda the week before Milton Obote was overthrown from power. Kasente, with Eleanor Maxine Ankrah and Victoria Mwaka decided they had to advance the conversation about women's right beyond only family-related issues towards wider gender equity and, after wide consultations met with enthusiasm for the idea, created a national women’s association. The women's group decided to create Action for Development (ACFODE) and the School of Women and Gender Studies at Makerere University in 1991 Kasente lead efforts to launch the school and fundraise for the school.

As a member of the Forum for Africa Women Educationalists, Kasente led East Africa consultations for the University of Cape Town's Equal Opportunity Research Project in 1995 as part of efforts to establish the African Gender Institute.

Action for Development remains the largest organization for women in Uganda.

In 1998 Karante wrote about the gaps in information flow in Uganda, where good research on issues of gender did make publication and did not reach policy-makers.

== Selected publications ==
- Institutionalizing Gender Equality in African Universities: The Case of Women’s and Gender Studies at Makerere University Feminist Africa, 2002
- Gender studies and gender training in Africa, Development in Practice, Vol. 6, No. 1 (Feb., 1996), pp. 50–54 (5 pages), Published By: Taylor & Francis, Ltd., JSTOR 4029354
- Deborah Kasente (2012) Fair Trade and organic certification in value chains: lessons from a gender analysis from coffee exporting in Uganda, Gender & Development, 20:1, 111-127, doi:10.1080/13552074.2012.663627
- Chapter 2 (Gender and Expansion of Nontraditional Agricultural Exports in Uganda) of Shifting Burdens Gender and Agrarian Change Under Neoliberalism published in 2002 by Kumarian Press ISBN 9781565491434
