= Babirye =

Babirye is a surname. Notable people with the surname include:

- Breeze Sarah Babirye Kityo (born 1986), Ugandan politician
- Judith Babirye (born 1977), Ugandan singer and politician
- Leilah Babirye (born 1985), Ugandan artist and activist
- Mary Babirye Kabanda (born 1971), Ugandan politician
- Milly Babirye Babalanda (born 1970), Ugandan politician
- Veronica Babirye Kadogo (born 1977), Ugandan politician
