= Gayaza =

Town in Buganda Region, Uganda

- Location in Uganda
- Coordinates: 00°27′03″N 32°36′42″E
- Country: Uganda
- Region: Central Region
- District: Wakiso District
- County: Kyaddondo
- Constituency: Kyaddondo North

Government
  - MP: Robert Sebunya Kasule
- Elevation: 3,760 ft (1,146 m)

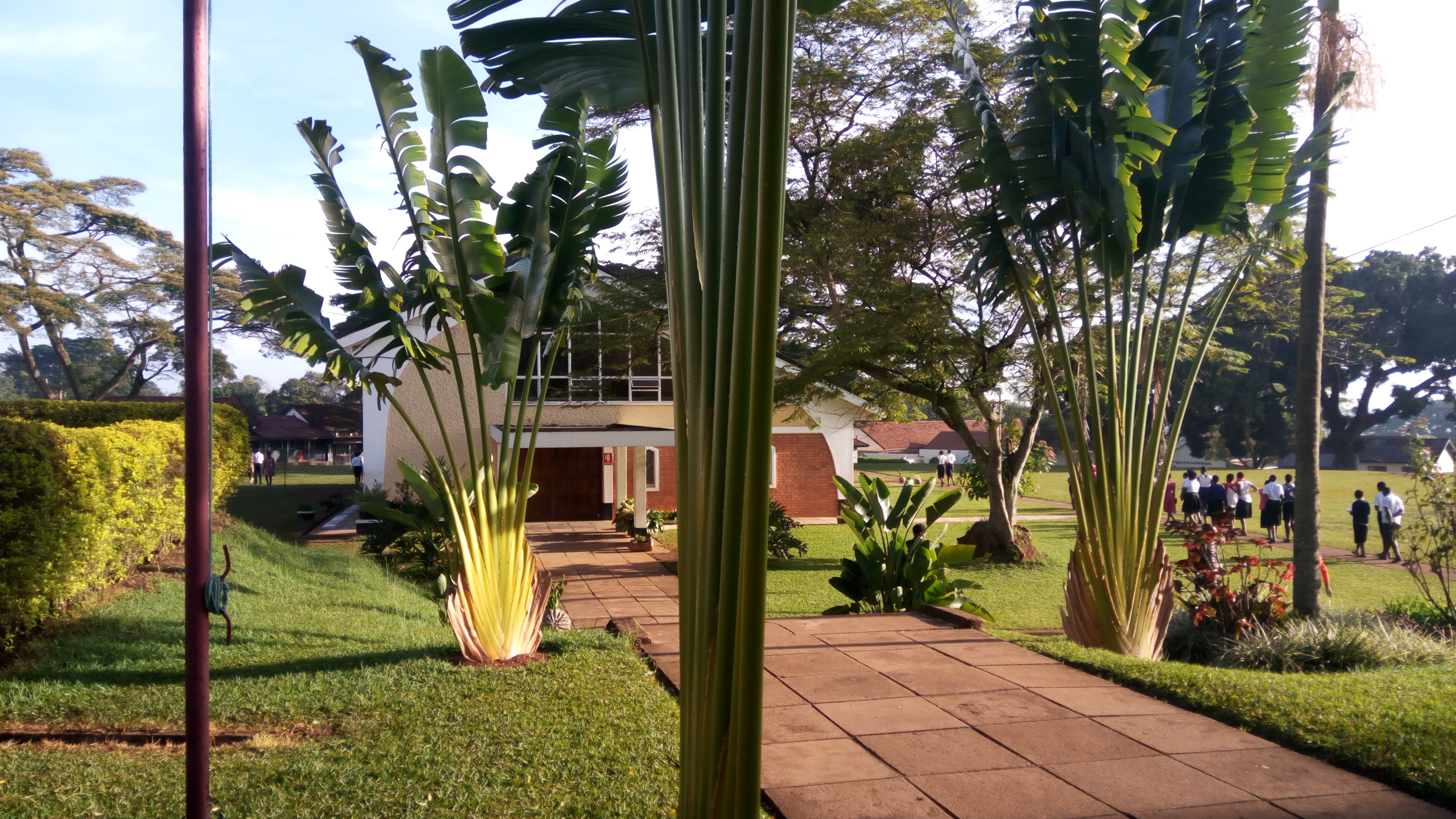
Gayaza High School

Gayaza is a town in Wakiso District in the Buganda Region of Uganda.

== Location ==
Gayaza is in the North Kyaddondo Constituency, Kyaddondo County. The town is approximately 2.5 kilometres (2 mi), north-east of Kasangati, on the Kampala–Ziroobwe Road. This is approximately 18 kilometres (11 mi), by road, north-east of Kampala, the capital and largest city of Uganda. The coordinates of Gayaza are 0°27'03.0"N, 32°36'42.0"E (Latitude:0.450833; Longitude:32.611667). Gayaza lies at an average elevation of 1,146 metres (3,760 ft), above sea level.

== Overview ==
In the early 20th century, Gayaza started as a road junction, where the road to Gayaza High School branched off the main road from Kampala to Kalagi. Shops began to appear in the middle of the century when the Uganda Ministry of Agriculture opened an agricultural research center at Namulonge. Later, Makerere University opened a crop and animal farm at Kabanyolo to cater for the faculties of Agriculture and Veterinary Medicine. Today, the township continues to grow and is continuous with Kasangati, a short distance to the south-east.

== Points of interest ==
The following points of interest lie within Gayaza township or close to its borders: (a) Gayaza High School, an all-girls' boarding middle and high school established in 1905. (b) the Gayaza–Ziroobwe Road, a 27 kilometres (17 mi) road that connects Gayaza to Ziroobwe in Luweero District (c) National Crops Resources Research Institute (NACRRI) at Namulonge, an agricultural research institute belonging to the Ugandan government.

Other points of interest include (d) Makerere University Agricultural Research institute, Kabanyolo, an animal and crop farm and research institute, shred between the Colleges of Agriculture and Veterinary Medicine of Makerere University. (e) Kira Farm Training Center, a residential vocational training school situated on 22 acres (9 ha) of land. (f) Gayaza Fresh Produce Market

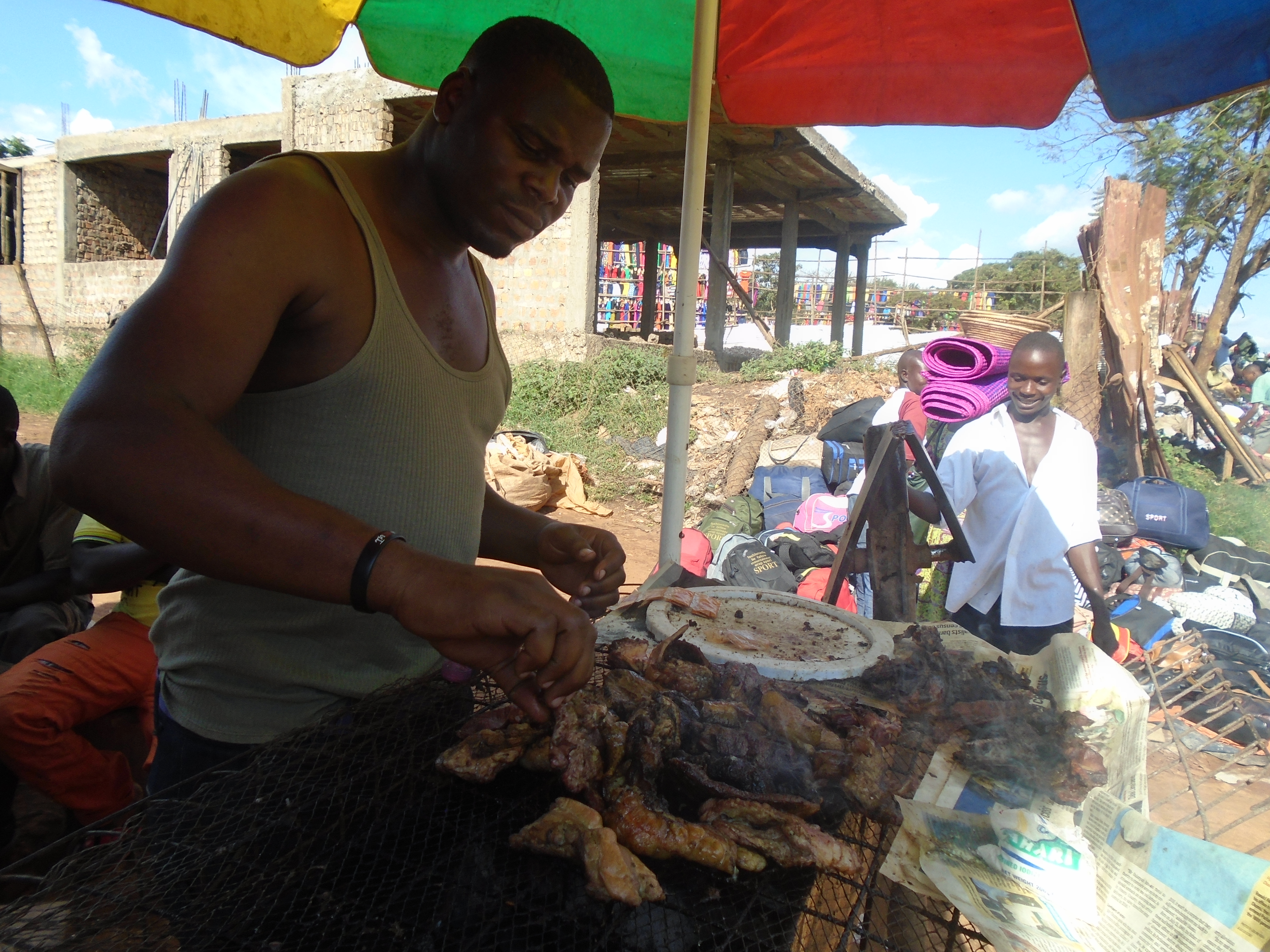
Gayaza Market

Also is the neighborhood are (g) Kampala Ice Motel, an international-standard, Holiday Inn-like motel established in 2013. (h) the Gayaza–Kalagi Road, connects Gayaza to Kalagi in Mukono District, a distance of approximately 20 kilometres (12 mi).

== Notable people ==
- Dennis Kasumba (born 2003), baseball player
- [Kyagulanyi Robert Ssentamu], presidential aspirant and former Ugandan Ragga Artist
