= John Chrysestom Muyingo =

Ugandan educator and politician

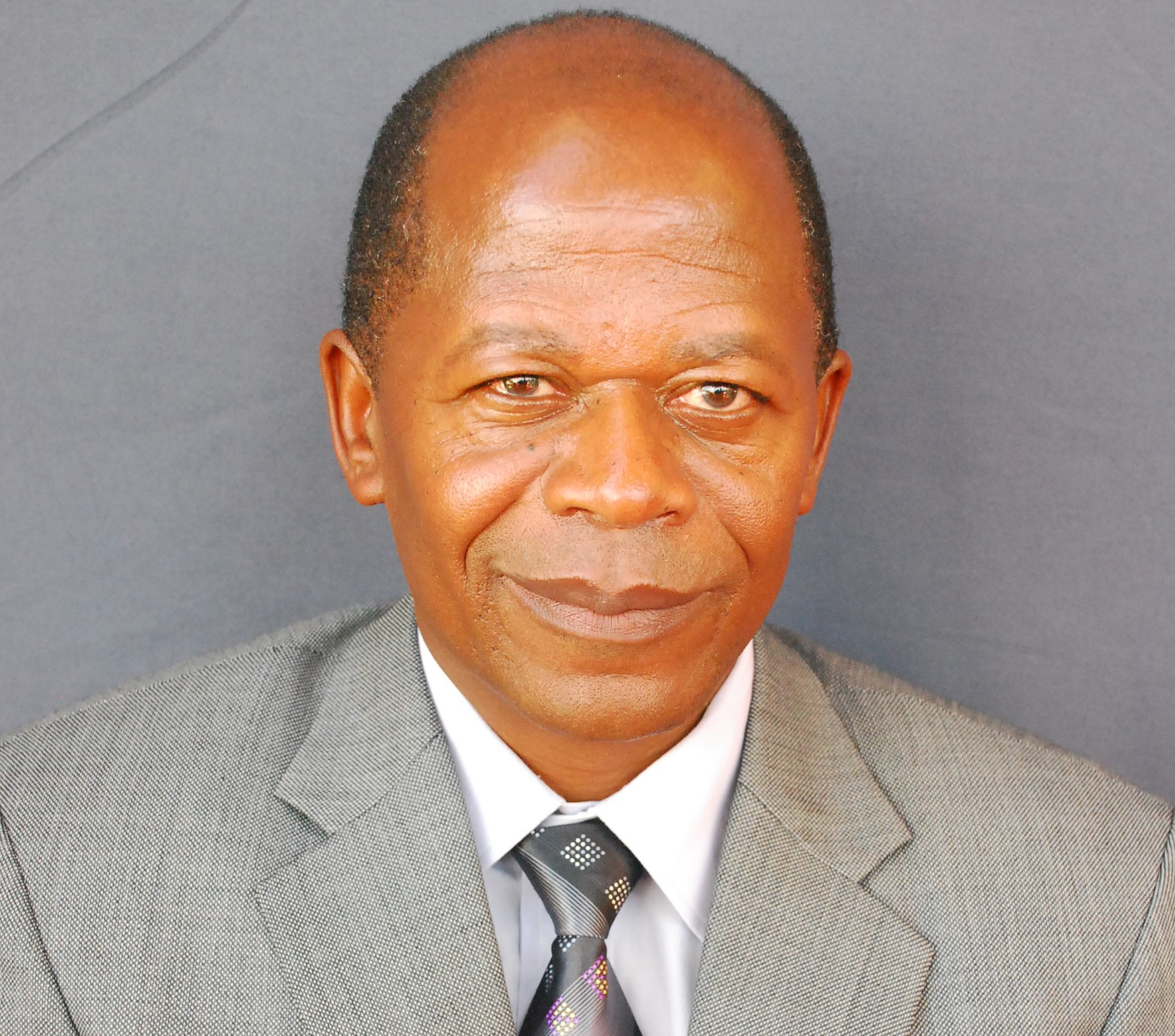
- Born: 22 February 1960 (age 66); Kakoola, Luweero District, Uganda
- Citizenship: Uganda
- Education: Makerere University (BSc), (Dip.Ed), (MA), (PhD)
- Occupations: Educator, Academic & Politician
- Years active: 1986 — present
- Known for: Education, Politics

John Chrysestom Muyingo is a Ugandan educator and politician. He is the Acting Minister for Education and Sports in the Ugandan Cabinet. He was appointed to that position on 25 June 2026. He previously served as the State Minister for Primary Education from 1 March 2015 until 5 June 2016. Before that, from 27 May 2011 until 1 March 2015, he served as the State Minister for Higher Education, having replaced Mwesigwa Rukutana in May 2011. Muyingo was also the elected Member of Parliament for Bamunanika County, Luweero District. In the 2021 general elections, he lost the seat to his former campaign manager and personal assistant, Robert Ssekitooleko who ran on the National Unity Platform party ticket.

== Background and education ==
Muyingo was born on 22 February 1960 to John Chrysestom Ssekidde of Kakoola Village, Bamunanika County, Luwero District and Victoria Nakiwala of Naakulabye, Lubaga Division, in Kampala, Uganda's capital. He attended the Mulajje Primary School, Kisubi Seminary, and Makerere College School, before joining Makerere University in 1983. He graduated in 1986 with a Bachelor of Science with a Diploma in Education. He also holds a Master of Arts in Educational Management, obtained in 1996, and a Doctor of Philosophy obtained in 2004, both from Makerere University. The dissertation for his doctorate focused on the financing of university education in Uganda.

== Career ==
Muyingo started his teaching career at Ndejje Secondary School where he taught chemistry and mathematics. He later taught at St. Joseph's School Nsambya where he became director of studies. He was then transferred to St. Joseph's Secondary School Naggalama, in Naggalama, Mukono District.

At Naggalama he became headmaster when the school was still O-Level only (S1 - S4). He started a boarding section for boys at Naggalama Hill, despite initial reservations by the school board. He then started an A-Level section at the school (S5 - S6). From Naggalama, he was transferred in 1992 to Uganda Martyrs' Secondary School Namugongo, located adjacent to the Uganda Martyrs Shine at Namugongo.

When he arrived at Namugongo, his first challenge was to upgrade and improve the school, then in a sorry state. The teachers would go home on Friday and return on Monday, leaving students on their own over the weekend. The infrastructure was poor, the classes inadequate, and there was no serious science lab. Male teachers were fratenising with female students. The school's Board of Governors had little interest in the school. Gradually, the new headmaster's efforts paid off. The year before he joined, the school had registered five first grades at O-level. In 1992, the number rose to 32, then 58 in 1993, 64 in 1994 and 90 in 1995. Henceforth, the numbers steadily rose with some years registering a 100 percent first grade pass rate. He served in that capacity from 1992 until 2010.

== Political career ==
In 2011, Muyingo entered active politics by contesting for the parliamentary seat of Bamunanika County in Luweero District, as an Independent. He won that seat with 92 percent of the votes cast.He lost the seat to NUP candidate in the 2021 general elections. . He has various ongoing projects in his constituency aimed at boosting the livelihood of his people. He is assisted by Mwebe William, Matabi Christopher, and Bazira Paul who lead the coordination team. They have steered a number of successful projects such as a pioneer elderly project the only of that kind in Uganda, a scholarship scheme called BACEF headed by Ssenyonjo Moses, the director of St. Mary's College Lugazi and assisted by Matabi Christopher and Bazira Paul. It has helped over 2500 less privileged students to access secondary education. He was appointed State Minister for Higher Education on 27 May 2011. After a brief stint as State Minister for Primary Education, from March 2015 until June 2016, he was re-appointed to the position of State Minister for Higher Education on 6 June 2016.

== Personal details ==
While at Uganda Martyrs' Secondary School Namugongo, Muyingo met Rosemary Namayanja, whom he married in 1992. They have six children. She is the Director at Seeta High Schools, in Seeta, Mukono District. The Muyingo family own Seeta High Schools. They are now four in total with a total of approximately 4,500 students all combined. They have also opened up three primary sections under the name Seeta Junior School and also have a Kindergarten wing with two branches. Away from school administration matters, Muyingo is popularly referred to as ‘Musajja wa Kabaka’ (Kabaka's right-hand man). In the past, he served in the Buganda Government as Minister of Education and was twice voted the best performing minister. His real name is Miyingo, but it was wrongly registered as Muyingo back in his early school days. Miyingo means a log used to lock an entrance to a kraal.

== See also ==
- Cabinet of Uganda
- Parliament of Uganda
- Luweero District
- Haruna Kasolo Kyeyune
