= Brenda Nabukenya =

Ugandan politician

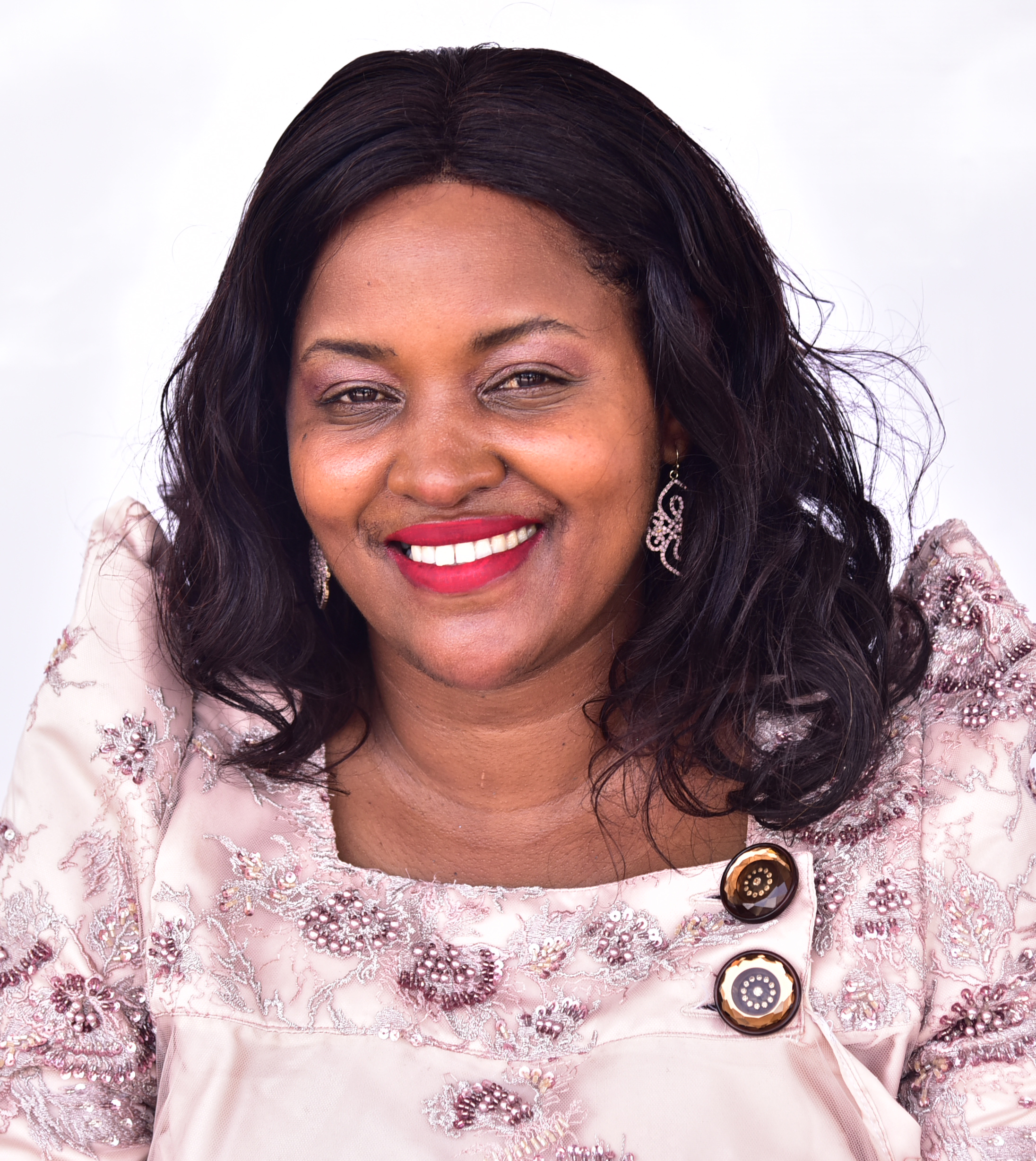

Woman Member of Parliament Luwero District
- Incumbent
- Assumed office 2011–present

Personal details
- Born: 19 April 1984 (age 42) Luwero
- Party: National Unity Platform
- Other political affiliations: Democratic Party (Uganda)

Brenda Nabukenya (born 19 April 1984) is a Ugandan politician and legislator. She represents the people of Luwero district as district woman representative for Luwero district in the parliament of Uganda. She is a member of National Unity Platform party on whose ticket she was voted into parliament in the 2021 Uganda general elections. National Unity platform is headed by Robert Kyagulanyi Sentamu alias Bobi wine.

== Early life and education ==
Nabukenya was born on 19 April 1984. She was previously a member of the Democratic party (DP) on whose ticket she won the guild presidency of Kyambogo University in 2005 and Member of parliament seat for Luwero district in between 2011 and 2016.

Prior to her election as the first female guild president of Kyambogo University, Nabukenya worked at a university bookstore in Kyambogo University.

At Kyambogo she pursued a bachelor's degree of science in nutrition and dietetics.

She later pursued a bachelor's degree in Law at Makerere University.

In 2020, She challenged Nobert Mao, Democratic part's president general to the DP party presidency.

In the 2021 Uganda general elections, Nabukenya won the election with 76,801 votes beating her closest rival, National Resistance Movement's Mulondo Cissy who garnered 40,353 votes.

== Career ==
Nabukenya is currently the shadow minister for education and sports in the opposition government.

She is also the vice chairperson on the Uganda Women Parliamentary Association (UWOPA). Brenda also participates in development forums and meetings that ensure the protection of women and girls rights in her constituency.

== See Also ==
- Anita Among
- Thomas Tayebwa
- Betty Amongi
- Jane Ruth Aceng
