= Bertha Kingori =

Tanzanian educator and politician

Nominated Member of the Legislative Council
- In office 1957–

Personal details
- Born: 19 November 1930 Tukuyu, Tanganyika
- Died: 4 November 2013 (aged 82) Kenya

Ndigwako Bertha Akim Kingori (19 November 1930 – 4 November 2013) was a Tanzanian educator and politician. She was appointed to the Legislative Council in 1957.

== Biography ==
Kingori was born in Tukuyu in November 1930 to Subila Kabonga and Akim Mwakosya. One of the few girls from her village to attend school, she was educated at Tabora Girls’ School and then the Gayaza High School and King's College Budo boarding schools in Uganda. In 1954 she began studying at Makerere College under a government scholarship, earning a diploma in education. Returning to Tanganyika, Kingori worked as a teacher at Loleza Girls' School in Mbeya. She attended Makerere College in Uganda during the 1950s under a government scholarship. During her studies she also helped at children's clinics in Kampala. In 1956 she was awarded a Van Leer and Atlanta Fellowship, resulting in her studying at Mount Holyoke College in the United States for a year.

Returning to Tanganyika, she taught at teacher training colleges in Butimba and Mpwapwa and became headmistress of Bwiru Girls' Secondary School in Mwanza. She was appointed to the Legislative Council in 1957. The following year she married Peter Gathura Kingori, with whom she had five children. In 1965 she was appointed to the East African University Council. In 1967 she was appointed executive secretary of the Umoja Wa Wanawake Wa Tanzania women's organisation. A member of the National Christian Council of Kenya, she was the first African woman to be appointed to the Anglican Consultative Council in 1973.

She died in Kenya in November 2013 and was buried at Mwalimu King’ori Farm in Nyeri.
