= Namulonge Airport =

Airport in Namulonge, Uganda

- IATA: none; ICAO: HUNA

Summary
- Airport type: Civilian
- Owner: Namulonge Agronometry Station
- Serves: Namulonge, Uganda
- Location: Namulonge, Uganda
- Elevation AMSL: 3,871 ft / 1,180 m
- Coordinates: 00°30′48″N 032°37′53″E

Map
- Location of the airport in Uganda

Runways
Direction	Length		Surface
Direction	m	ft	Surface
13/31	580	1,903	Unpaved
- Sources: Google Maps

Namulonge Airport, also referred to as Namulonge Airstrip, is a small civilian serving airstrip at Namulonge Agronometeorology Station near the town of Namulonge in the Wakiso District of Uganda, 75 kilometres (47 mi) north of central Kampala. The narrow runway is also used as a road and also surrounded by plowed fields of the agricultural research station.

The station has an automated airport weather station (AWOS) system installed. The "HUNA" ICAO airport code may be no longer active.

== See also ==
- Transport in Uganda
- List of airports in Uganda
