= Nvumetta Ruth Kavuma =

Ugandan politician, rotarian and educator

- Born: May 26, 1956 (age 70); Ssese islands
- Citizenship: uganda
- Education: Makerere University
- Occupation: Educator/Politician
- Spouse: Justice Steven Kavuma
- Children: Four

Nvumetta Ruth Kavuma better known as Ruth Kavuma is a Ugandan politician, rotarian and educator. She was the first African headmistress of Gayaza High School for 11 years between 1990 and 2002. After leaving Gayaza High School, she joined politics and became the Member of Parliament in the eighth Parliament of Uganda representing Kalangala District under the National Resistance Movement political party. She is a founding member of Forum for African Women Educationalists (FAWE) and the first Chairperson of Board of the Uganda Chapter, an organization that advocates for girl child education.

== Personal life ==
She was born in Ssese islands to James Lutaaya and bred in Gayaza High School. She has four children.

== Education ==
In 1963, she joined Gayaza Junior School and later joined Gayaza High School in 1970. She was a prefect and played Volleyball. She studied at Makerere University for a science degree in Physics, Chemistry and Mathematics, and later dropped Chemistry for Psychology.

== Career ==
She is the Vice Chairperson of National Identification and Registration Authority (NIRA). She is a member of the Network of African Ministers and Parliamentarians Uganda Chapter. During her political journey at the Parliament of Uganda, she served on the Finance Committee which gave her an opportunity to advocate for resources to support reproductive health commodities. She is the former Chairperson of Mama Alive Initiatives (MAI) and a member of the Network of Women Parliamentarians in Uganda. She belongs to the Rotary Club of Kampala Ssese Islands and served as the past President and past Governor of the club. She also chaired the construction of the Mengo Hospital Rotary Bank which is still working until now. She is a board member for the Concern for the Girl Child Uganda and a member of the Kisaakate Kya Nnabagereka Board.

In her early life, she worked as an engineering trainee with Uganda Post Office and Telecommunication. After sometimes, she realized that she did not like engineering and went back to Makerere for a Post Graduate Diploma in Education (1979-1980). After this course, she was posted to Gayaza High School and later left for politics in 2001 and became the Kalangala District woman Member of Parliament. She left politics which threatened NRM as a political party over opposition politician taking over MP seat for Kalangala District. When she joined Gayaza High School to teach, she was nominated to the Parents and Teachers Association as a teachers’ representative. She was later appointed as the acting deputy teacher and later confirmed as the headmistress for the school. This happened when Sheelagh Warren, the school’s headmistress had clocked the retirement age of 60 and was returning to England. She is currently a counsellor.

== See also ==
- List of members of the eighth Parliament of Uganda
- Gayaza High School
- Section about Ruth Nvumetta Kavuma (1990–2002) on Gayaza High School
- National Identification and Registration Authority
