= Gayaza–Ziroobwe Road =

Road in Uganda

Coordinates: 00°34′14″N 32°38′38″E

Route information
- Length: 21 mi (34 km)
- History: Designated in 2008; Completion in 2011

Major junctions
- South end: Gayaza
- North end: Ziroobwe

Location
- Country: Uganda

Highway system
- Roads in Uganda

Gayaza–Ziroobwe Road is a road in central Uganda, connecting the towns of Gayaza in Wakiso District and Ziroobwe in Luweero District.

== Location ==
The road starts at Gayaza and proceeds northeastwards, going through Namulonge, Busiika, and Bugema before ending in Ziroobwe, a distance of about 33 kilometres (21 mi).

== Overview ==
Prior to 2007, the road had a gravel surface. In 2007, the government of Uganda began to upgrade the surface to bitumen at an estimated cost of US$40 million. The work, undertaken by Serbian firm Energoprojekt, began in March 2007 and was originally expected to be completed in November 2009. The construction and improvement of the road were extended to include the Kampala-Gayaza section of the road. Because of repeated delays, work was not completed until June 2011.

== Points of interest ==
The following points of interest also lie along or near the road:

- the town of Gayaza in Wakiso District, 3 kilometres (1.9 mi), by road, east of Kasangati
- Gayaza High School, an all-girls boarding high school established in 1905
- Kabanyolo Farm, an agricultural and livestock farm that belongs to the College of Agricultural Sciences and the College of Veterinary Medicine, both at Makerere University
- National Crops Resources Research Institute, located at Namulonge
- Bugema University, a private university, maintains its main campus along this road.
- In Ziroobwe, this road joins the Ziroobwe–Wobulenzi Road.

== See also ==
- List of roads in Uganda
