= Gayaza High School =

Girls-only secondary school in Gayaza, Buganda, Uganda

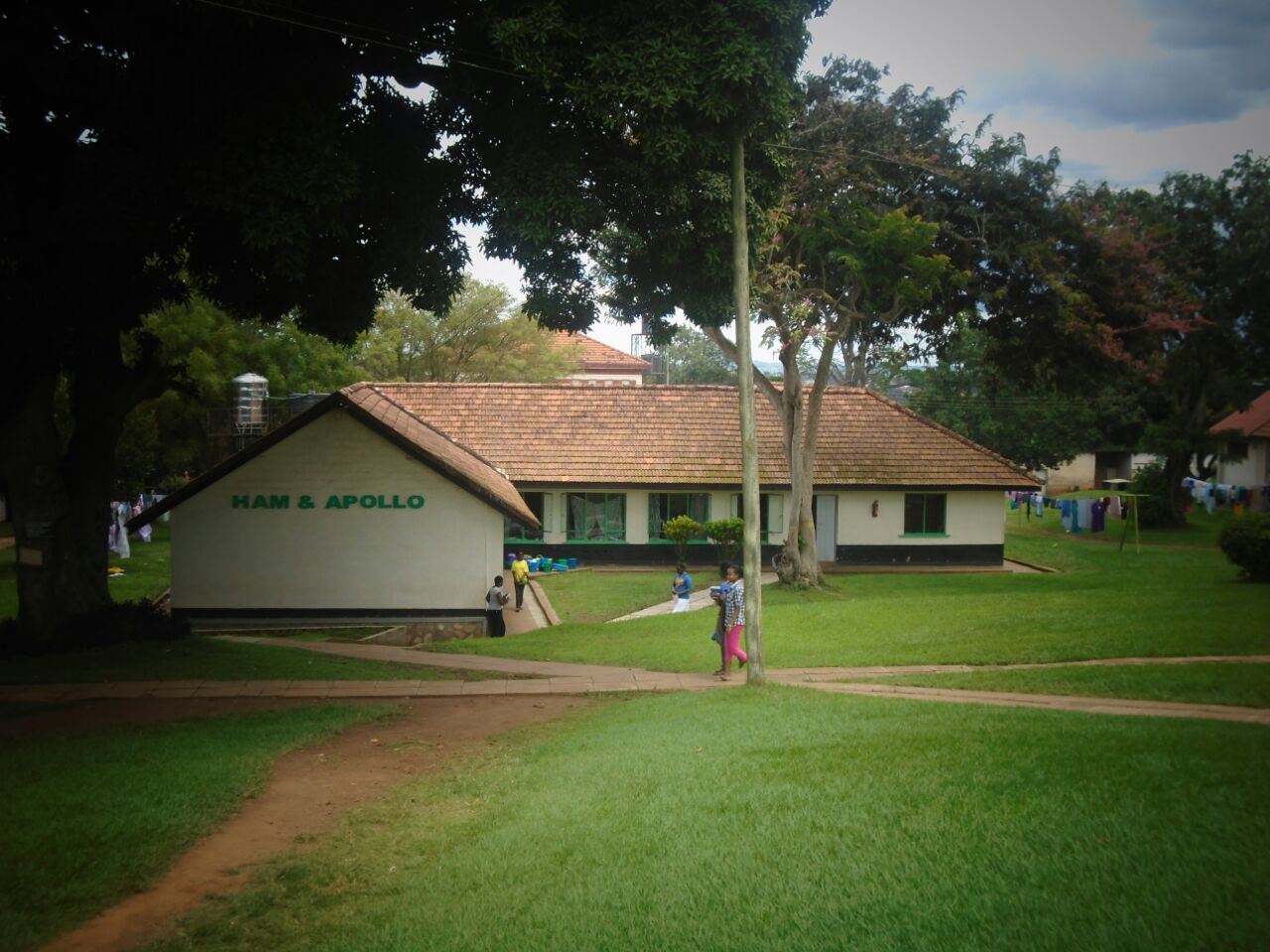
- Residential Hall, Gayaza High school

Location
- Gayaza - Zirobwe Road; East Africa; Gayaza, Kasangati Town Council, Wakiso District, Buganda; Uganda
- 00°27′36″N 32°36′39″E

Information
- Type: Girls-only secondary school
- Motto: Never Give Up! (Banno)
- Religious affiliation: Anglican
- Founded: 1905 (121 years old)
- Founders: Church Missionary Society of England
- Sister school: Gayaza Junior School, King's College Budo, Namilyango College, St. Mary's College Kisubi, Trinity College Nabbingo, Nabisunsa Girls School, Mt. St. Mary's Namagunga
- School district: Wakiso
- Headmistress: Kizito Robinah Katongole
- Chaplain: Rev. Lovincer Kiwanuka Nalusiba; Tendo
- Gender: All-female
- Age range: 13–20
- Enrollment: 1,572 (June 2024)
- Houses: Corby, Cox, Ham & Apollo, Hutchinson, Kennedy, Kivebulaya, Rhoda Nsibambi, Sherborne (Mary Stuart), Waren
- Colours: Red and white
- Song: Give thanks to the Lord (Psalms 107)
- Athletics: Major sports: cricket, track and field, swimming, basketball, netball, volleyball, lawn tennis, golf, table tennis, hockey, badminton, lacrosse, fencing
- Nickname: Gyza, GHS, Gahisco, Gayaza High, Gayaza, Ggayaaza, Giza
- Publication: Kaleidoscope
- Alumni: Gayaza Old Girls Association (GOGA)
- Website: www.gayazahs.sc.ug

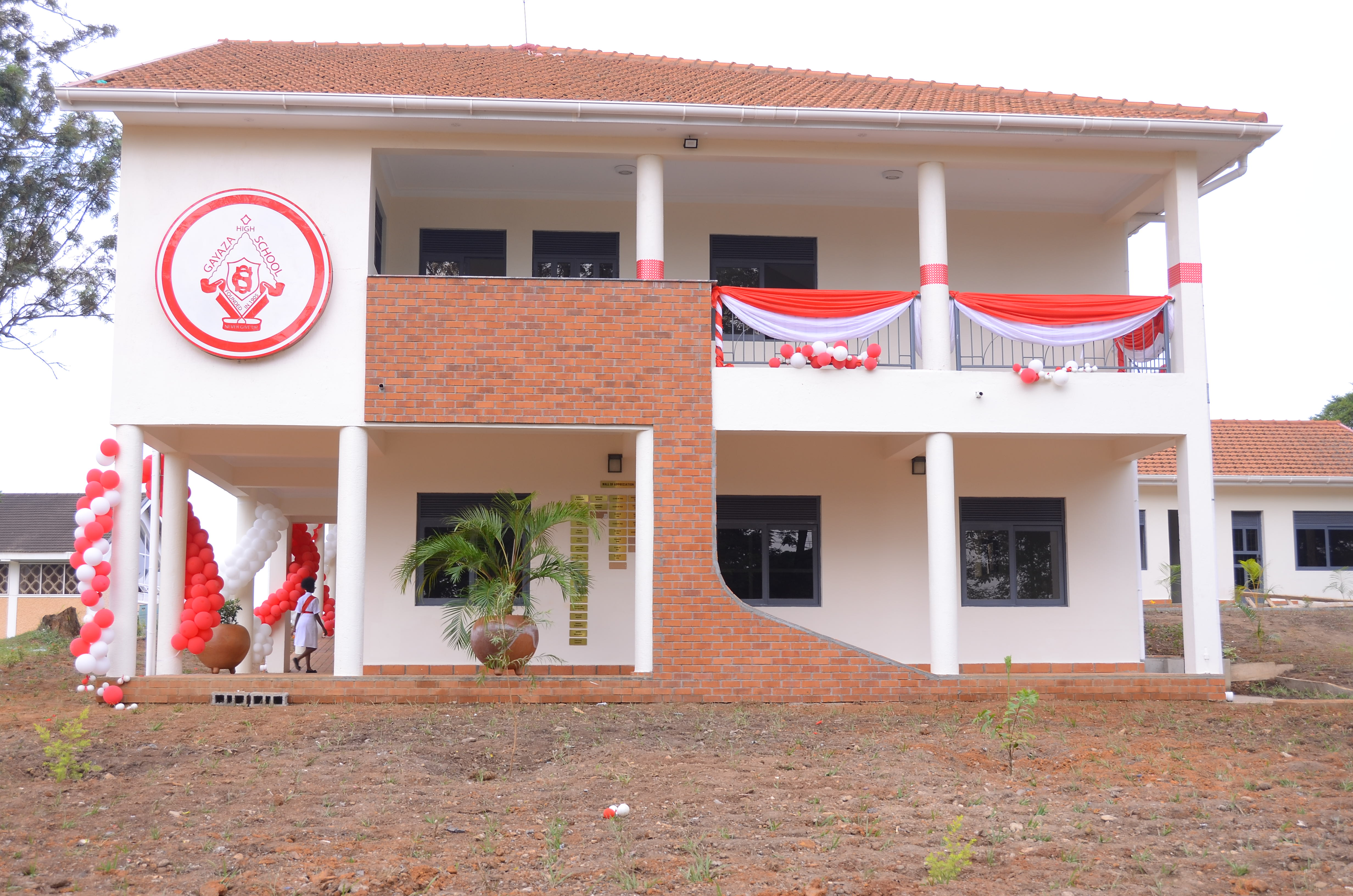
Gayaza High School new administration block

Gayaza High School is the oldest all-girls boarding secondary school covering grades 8 to 13 (Secondary 1 to 6) in Uganda. The school is church-founded, government-aided and accredited by the Ministry of Education, Science, Technology and Sports.

== Location ==
The school is located in Gayaza town, Gayaza Zone B Local Council One (LC1), Kasangati town council, Kyadondo County, Wakiso District, approximately 19 kilometres (12 mi) northeast of Kampala, Uganda's capital city.

Gayaza High School covers an area of 104.76 acres on a flat-topped ridge with gentle slopes and lies at an average height of 3,800 feet above sea level. To the north, it is bordered by Makerere University Agricultural Research Institute and Kabanyolo (University Farm), and in the west by Makenke village, separated by the Gayaza – Zirobwe road.

The area to the east between the school farm and the road from Kampala to Kalagi, Mukono is Kyetume village. To the south the school is bordered by Gayaza Junior School, a parish church and the neighborhood of Gayaza Trading Centre. At this point, the main road from Kampala forks, one road leading to Kalagi in Mukono District and the other to National Crops Resources Research Institute (NaCRRI) in Namulonge, and on to Ziroobwe.

The lane between the two roads leading up to the school, past the primary day schools and the parish church, is a cul de sac, which accounts for the school's relative security in times of trouble.

== History ==
Christian missionaries belonging to the Church Missionary Society of England founded Gayaza High School on the land that was donated to the church by Kabaka Daudi Cwa II (King of Buganda) in January 1905 with four pioneer students, and hence became Uganda's first girls’ boarding school.

The purpose of the school's establishment was to train girls, especially the daughters of chiefs of the Kingdom of Buganda, in those skills that would make them better wives but his was only a basis of security approval from the traditional leaders of that time. The founders, however, had a different motive: to educate girls based on a strong Christian foundation. They realized that the best way of entrenching Christianity was by having Christian mothers under whom children spent their formative years.

In the beginning, the school's curriculum included agriculture, handiwork, child-care and needlework, as well as scripture, reading, writing, arithmetic and geography.

Gayaza High School was built on a 140-acre piece of land, with three houses: Kikko, Kyawakati and Manga. Its motto was "Banno" (friends). The girls initially put on a suuka (bed-sheet) for the school uniform, although this was modified into a uniform with a Victorian dress top, akin to the current Baganda traditional dress bodingi (gomesi). Later, Alfreda Allen (the founding headmistress) designed a new uniform with a round-neck, with short Magyar sleeves, an embroidered badge and different colours used to distinguish classes.

In 1939, the informal senior secondary section began. In 1962, the secondary school was separated from the junior school. Gayaza Junior School retained the old premises on the eastern side, while the secondary school, retaining the original name of Gayaza High School, found a home on the western wing. When they separated, Gayaza Junior School changed its motto from "Banno" and started sharing Gayaza High School's motto: "Never Give Up". As a result, from 1963, Hill became the Junior School's headmistress while Joan Cox was the secondary school's head teacher.

From four girls, the twin-schools have gone on to become two of Uganda's academic giants, increasing enrollment at both schools to more than 1,000 pupils and students respectively.

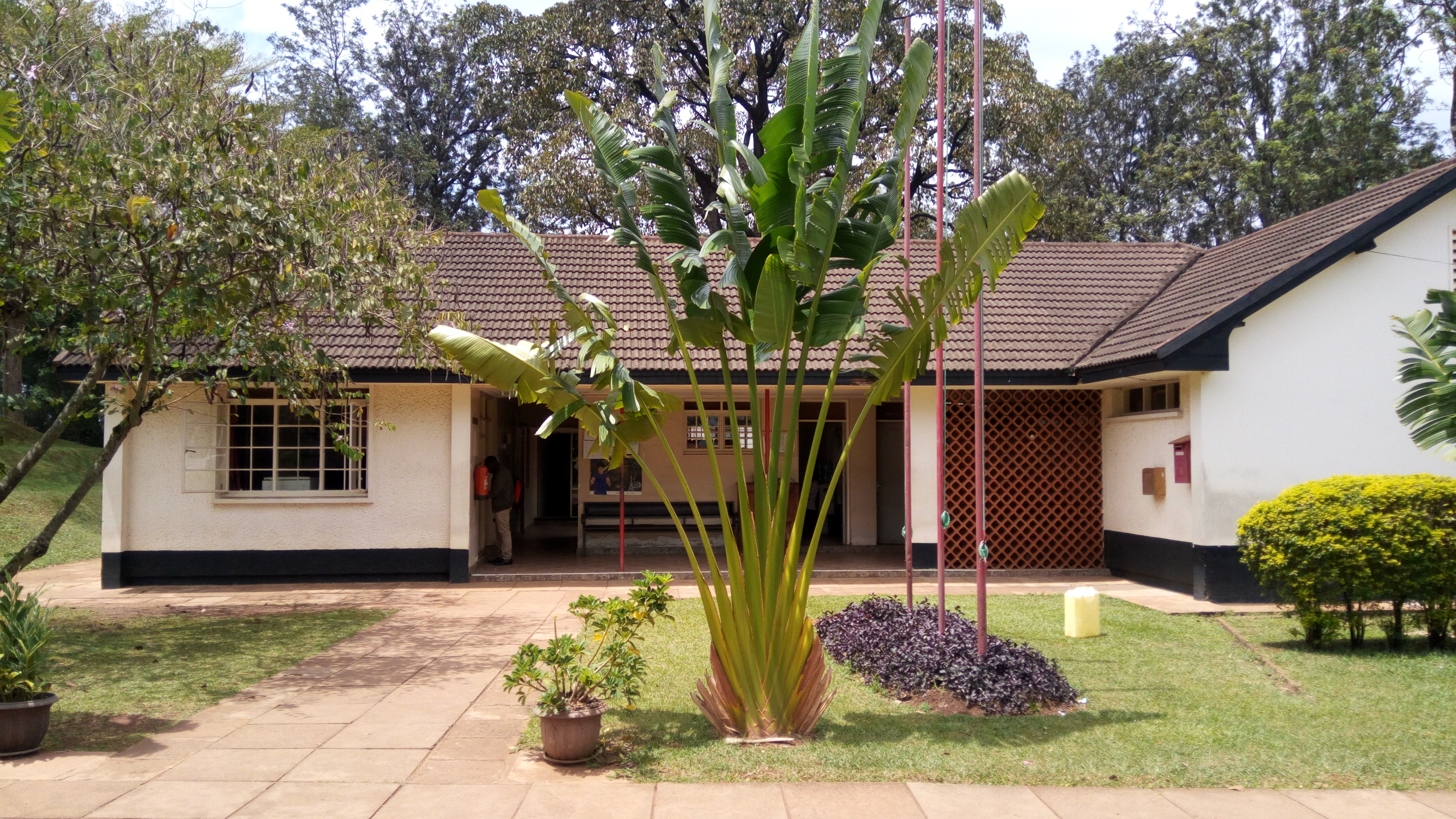
Former administration block (2017)

Originally, any girl, as long as she was a daughter of a chief in the Buganda Kingdom, was admitted to Gayaza. Later, even those from rich families were able to join the school. Eventually the system changed further so that one had to pass their written examinations to get into Gayaza. Today this is still the practice.

== Current status ==
GHS is a Church of Uganda founded and government-aided girls' boarding secondary school that offers both Arts and Sciences and a plethera of co-curricular activities.

The school has both the Ordinary and Advanced levels of education whose focus is on holistic development of an entire human being. It follows the National Curriculum that is assessed by the Uganda National Examinations Board (UNEB).

== Governance and management ==
=== Governance ===
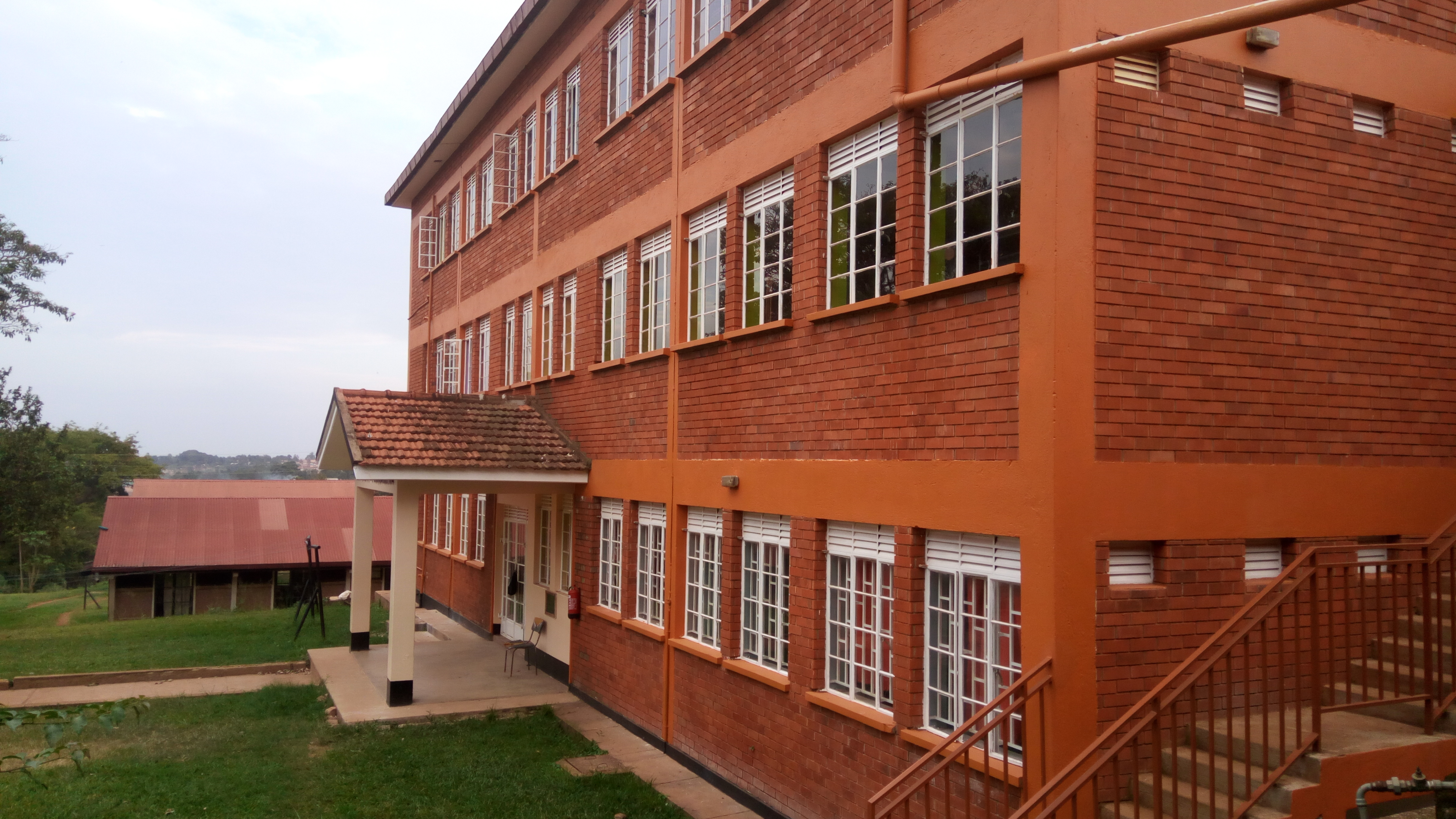
Rhoda Nsibambi House

The Board of Governors is the governing body of the school and is constituted as provided for by the Education Board of Governors regulations, section 59 part (ii) of the Education Act, 2008. It consists of about 15 people representing all the major stakeholders: foundation body, parents, teachers, non-teaching staff, local government and alumni.

=== Management ===
The day-to-day management of the school is headed by the head teacher (headmistress) who is supported by two deputies and a director of studies. There are three deans: a dean of the Lower school (Secondary 1 and 2), a dean of the Middle School (Secondary 3 and 4), and a dean of the Upper school (Secondary 5 and 6). A senior woman, a senior man and a senior house mistress support the management of the school.

== Headmistresses ==
=== Alfreda Allen (founding headmistress 1905–1930) ===
Alfreda Allen was the first headmistress of Gayaza in 1905. Sent by the Church Mission Society (CMS) to fast-track girls' education in the country, she arrived in Buganda with Janet Smith, later followed by Dorothy Allan, Nancy Corby and Irene Steintz to start the school. In 1904, under the reign of Kabaka Daudi Cwa II, Sir Apollo Kaggwa, a chief in Buganda, asked the England-based Church Mission Society to open a girls' school at Gayaza. This was resisted at first, because the then chiefs were not willing to pay for girls' education. These fears were, however, swept aside when a CMS ladies' conference, convened in England, resolved that a girls' school be started near the Gayaza mission land, which was donated by the king. Prior to this, there had been a few boys' schools, while the girls were only receiving church instruction in the scriptures and catechism in preparation for baptism. In recognition of her memorable work, the school chapel (Alfreda Allen Chapel) was named after her.

=== Joan Cox (1950–1972) ===
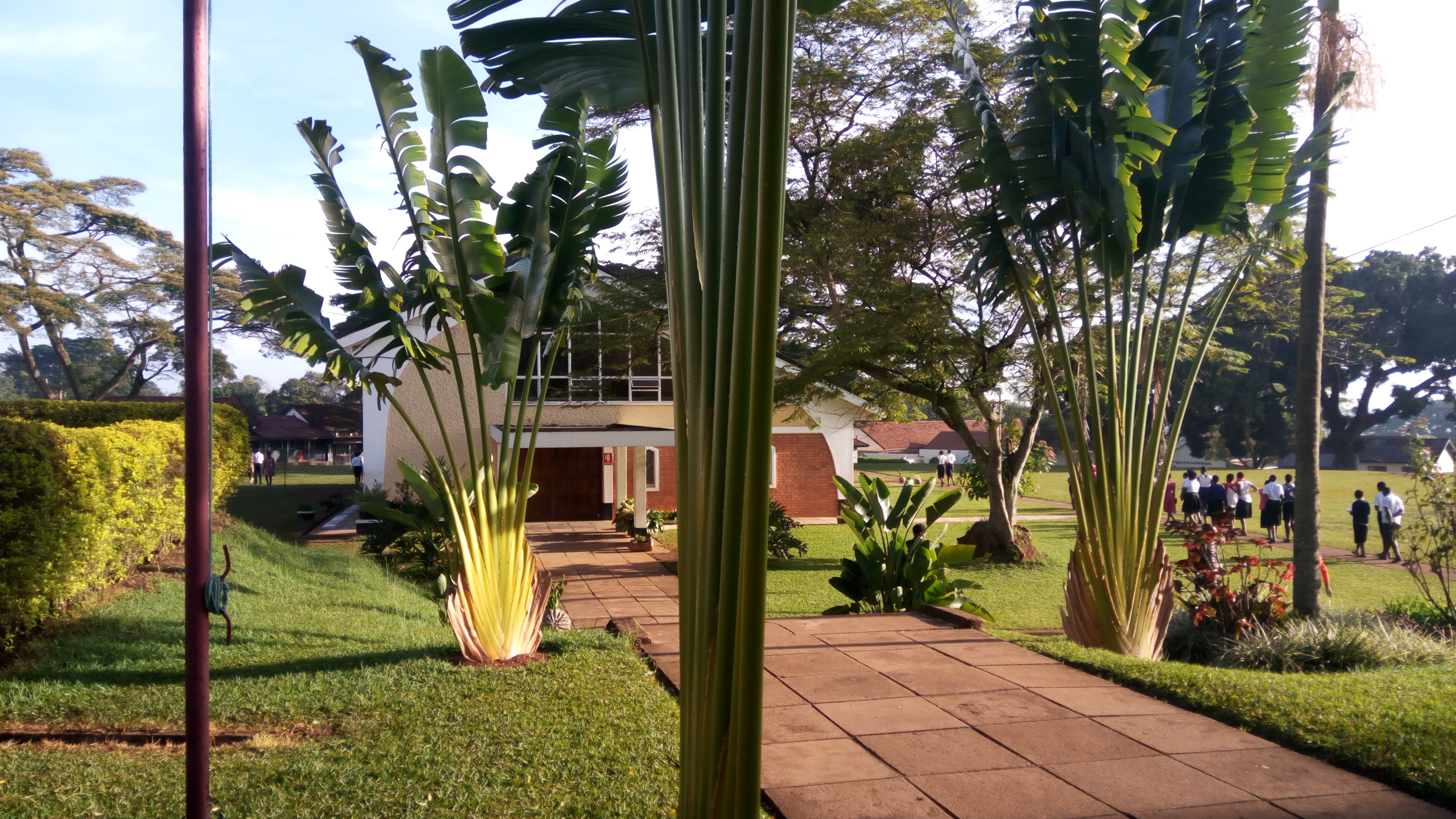
Alfreda Allen Chapel

Joan Cox came to Gayaza High School in 1938 under the auspices of the Church Mission Society and served as headmistress of Gayaza High School for 22 years. She did a lot to ensure development and excellence at Gayaza High School. It was during her time that the chapel, library and administration block were built. Her wise leadership also led to the establishment of the school farm and the success of the farm diet scheme. One of the dormitories (Cox) in the school has been named after her. Her influence reached all corners of Uganda and has influenced the education of Uganda's girl-child. She lived to be 100 and died on 14 April 2012.

=== Sheelagh Warren (1972–1990) ===
Sheelagh Warren was headmistress of Gayaza High School for 18 years. She took over from Cox when she left, having overseen the development of the secondary school to O' and A' levels, the construction of most of the permanent buildings and the establishment of the school's reputation for academic excellence. Warren steered the school through Uganda's most turbulent times - through the 1979 war that toppled Idi Amin, the five-year National Resistance Army guerrilla war that brought NRM into power in 1986. Despite the insecurity and scarcity of the times, the school continued to run successfully. Warren turned 90 in November 2017, and the Warren Computer Center/Laboratory at Gayaza is named after her.

=== Ruth Nvumetta Kavuma (1990–2002) ===
"Being the first African headmistress of Gayaza High School and staying there for 11 years was perhaps my greatest achievement", Ruth Kavuma writes in one of her memoirs. "The change in leadership was done so well. Ms. Warren had documented every activity in an exercise book which she handed to me, giving all the guidelines of what is done during which months of the year. It proved very helpful to me in terms of having a soft landing as well as maintaining the school standard." On leaving Gayaza, Kavuma joined politics and served as a Member of Parliament for several years.

=== Joy Male (2002–2006) ===
Joy Male became headmistress of Gayaza High School in August 2002 after Kavuma left and stayed until April 2006, when she retired from the civil service on reaching 60 years of age. She had had a stint as head teacher at Nakasero Secondary School, Mengo Senior School and Makerere College School before she joined Gayaza. One of her challenges was joining as a new staff member, yet as head teacher. Under her leadership, construction of Rhoda Nsibambi dormitory was completed, construction of the Ruth Nvumetta Kavuma classroom block started and she oversaw several school building renovation projects.

=== Victoria Kisarale (2009–2019) ===
Victoria Sserunkuuma Kisarale, fondly known as Kisa, came to Gayaza High School in 1998 as deputy head teacher under Kavuma and later Joy Male. In 2009 she was made substantive headteacher, and served for 10 years until she retired in August 2019. She did a lot to inculcate values in the students with emphasis on 21st century skills.

During her time, the school gate was given a face lift, the dining room was expanded, the swimming pool pavilion was constructed and the new administration block was started by the Old Girls. She also saw the school farm flourish during her time. She greatly impacted on the education of the girl child and inspired many.

=== Kizito Robinah Katongole (2019–present) ===
Robinah, the current head teacher, took office on 10 October 2019. Being an Old Girl, she was not a new face on the Gayaza High School compound. Formerly a literature teacher for about 17 years before she acted as deputy head teacher under Kisarale.

== Student residences ==
Gayaza High School has 8 student dormitories which are named after prominent Ugandans, politicians or after administrators at the school. They include:

- Corby House
- Cox House
- Ham & Apollo House
- Hutchinson House
- Kennedy House
- Kivebulaya House
- Rhoda Nsibambi House
- Sherborne (Mary Stuart) House

=== Corby House ===
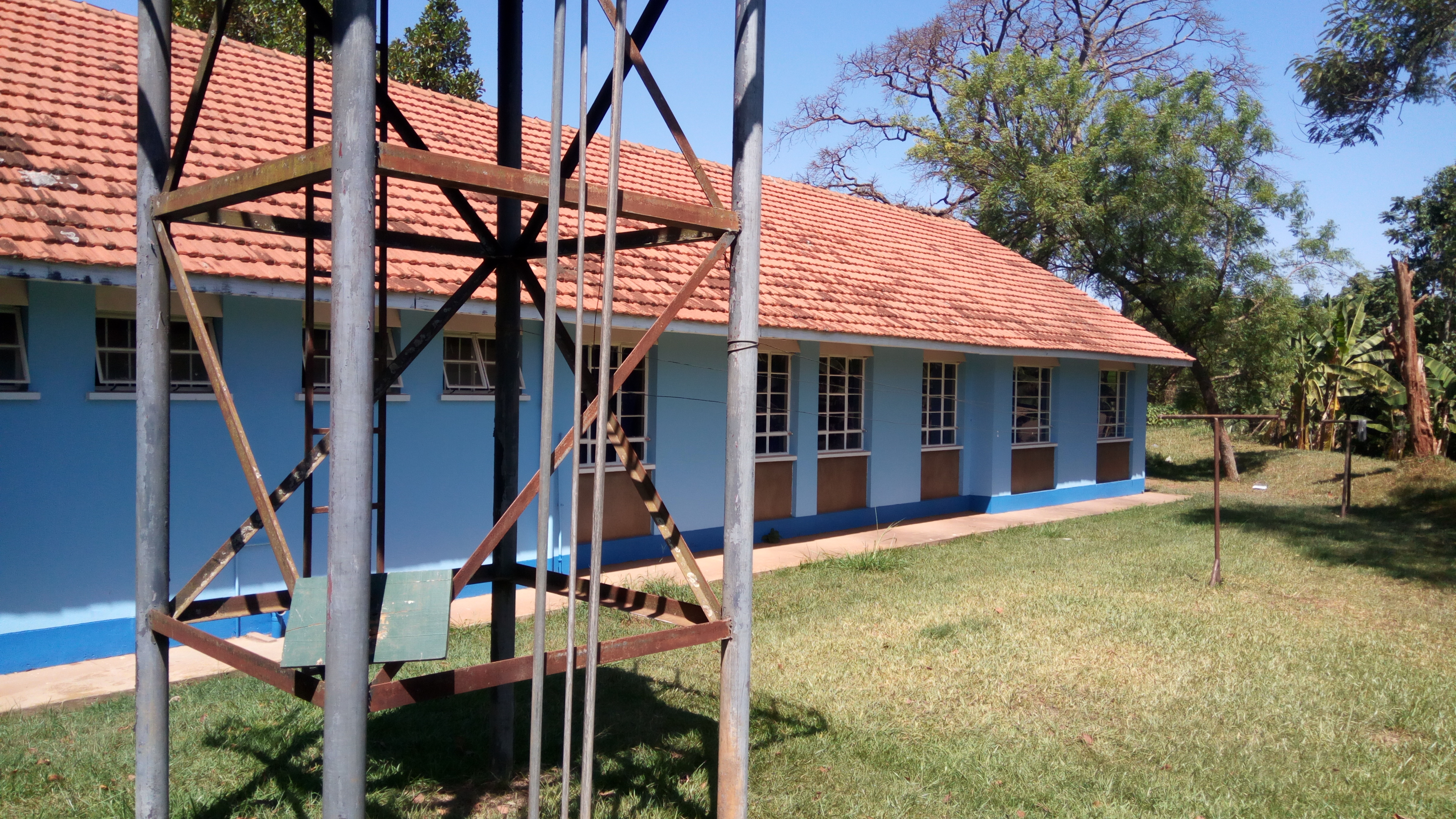
Corby House

Corby ouse, one of the oldest dormitories in Gayaza High School, was named after Headmistress Nancy Corby, who preceded Joan Cox in 1963. She was the last one to be head of Junior School. Previously, Gayaza Junior and Gayaza High School were one school, until 1962, when the secondary section was started with Cox as its first headmistress.

The house has both the junior and senior blocks. The junior block has eight rooms, two of which are prefects' rooms, while the senior block has 12 rooms, one of which belongs to the sitting house prefect. The residents of this house are known as "Corbians", with blue as their theme colour. Corby's motto is "Forward Ever, Backward Never".

=== Cox House ===
The dormitory was named after Joan Cox, who was headmistress of Gayaza High School for 22 years. By the early 1970s, most of the modern buildings had been added to the school during her leadership. Cox house (formerly Tulip Tree) and Kivebulaya (formerly Canna Lily) were constructed with funds from the World Bank around 1970. Due to space shortage, students from Cox and Kivebulaya dormitories have traditionally been distributed to other houses when they return for their A-level. Today, residents of this house are known as "Coxites" and their house theme colour is maroon.

=== Ham & Apollo House ===
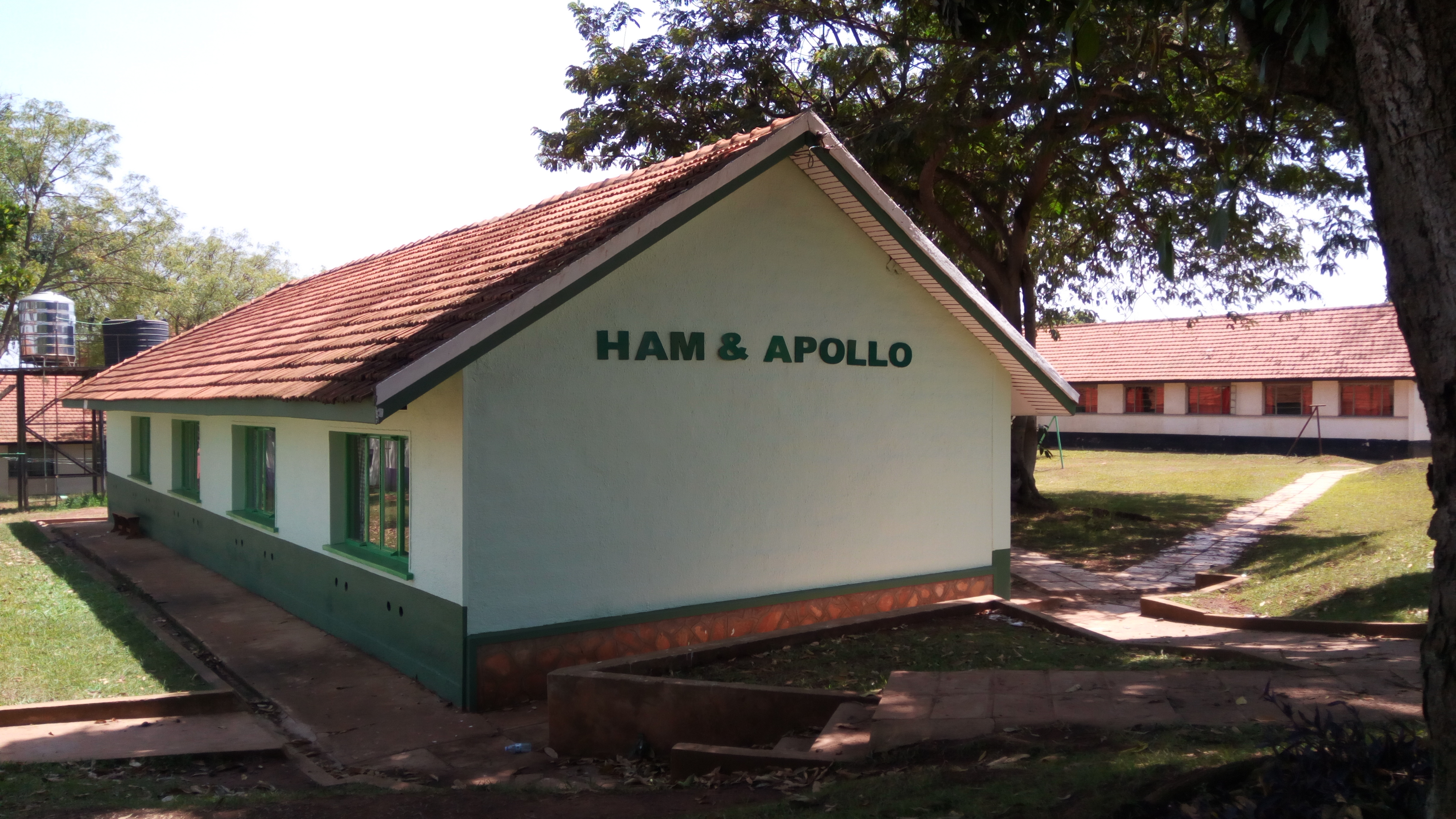
Ham & Apollo House

Ham & Apollo House (also known as "Ham") was named after two Buganda chiefs, Sir Apollo Kaggwa and Ham Mukasa, who were political pioneers and promoted education in Uganda. Kaggwa was Katikkiro of Buganda (1865–1927). Under Kabaka Daudi Cwa II, in 1904, he requested the Church Mission Society to open a girls' school at Gayaza. Mukasa (1870–1956) served as secretary to the Katikkiro of Buganda. He contributed to the modernisation of Uganda through introduction of modern education, health, agriculture and Christianity. Members of this house are referred to as "Hamites" and their theme colour is green.

=== Hutchinson House ===
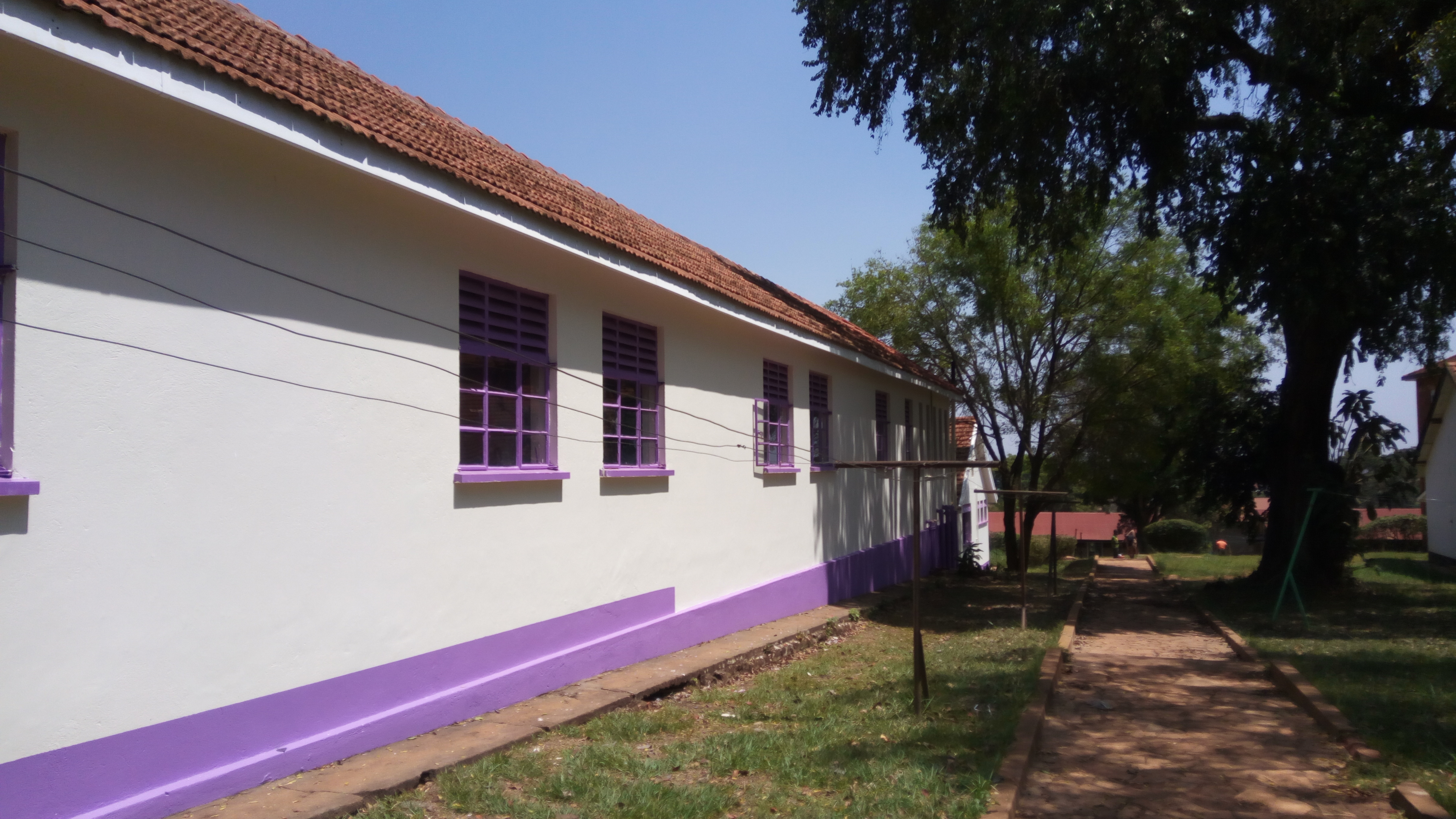
Hutchinson House

"Hutch", as it is usually referred to by students, is located in the middle of the school. It is named after Sir Joseph Hutchinson and Lena Hutchinson, who were staff members of Namulonge Cotton Research Station, located a few kilometers from the school. The Hutchinsons worked tirelessly with Pamela Goode, then a teacher at the school, to establish the school farm in 1954. With this establishment, the school started the farm diet scheme in 1955. Hutchinson is the second largest house after Rhoda Nsibambi. Today, members of this house are called "Hutchites" and their theme colour is purple.

=== Kennedy House ===
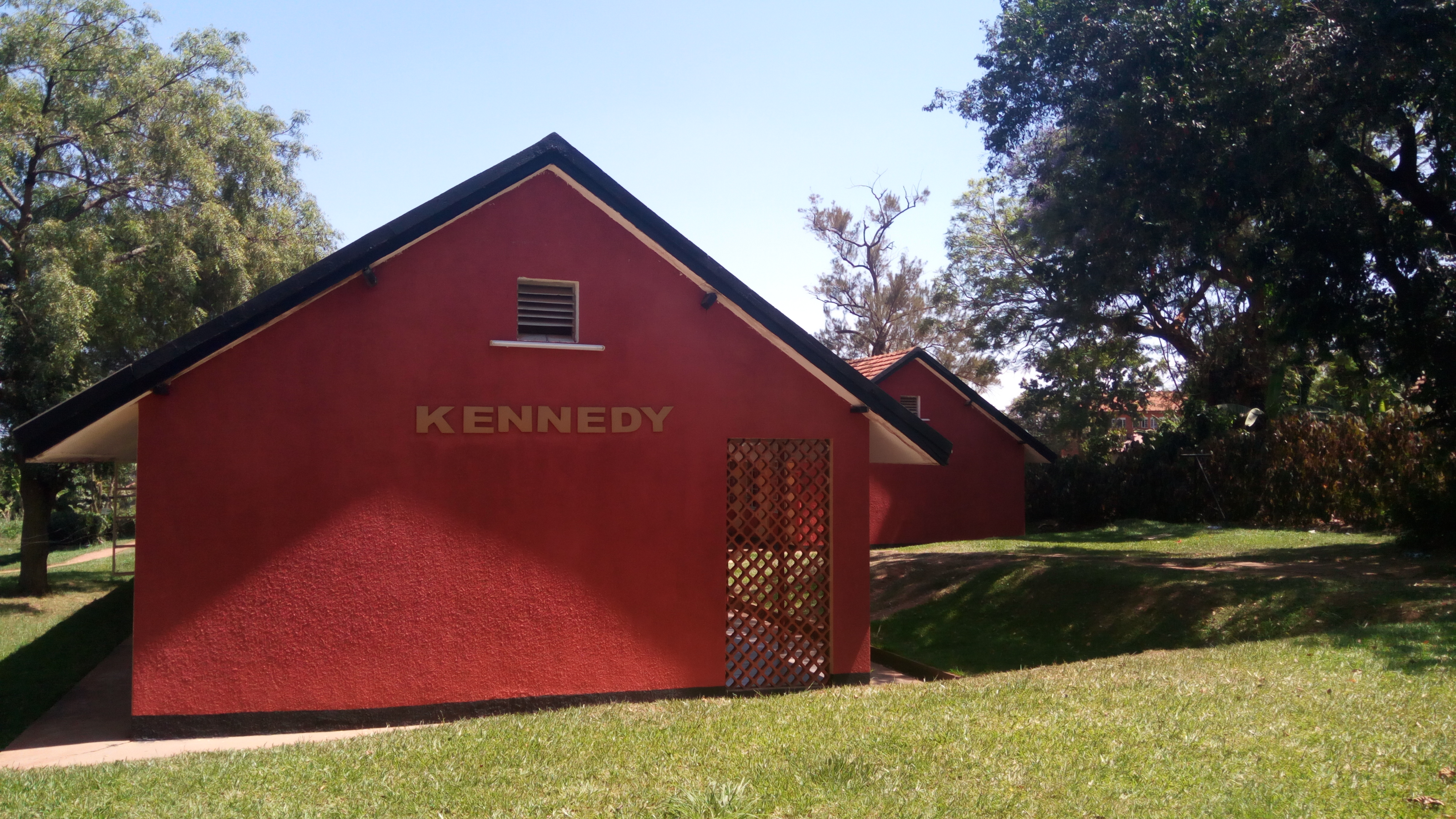
Kennedy House

Kennedy House was opened in 1964 and named after the president of the United States of America, John F. Kennedy, who was assassinated in 1963 and had vehemently fought for rights of African-Americans. During the house's construction, the Gayaza girls wanted to honor him. Although he had no connection with Uganda, America was already playing a clear role in Uganda, with volunteer teachers and grants for education through USAID.

The motto of Kennedy House is written in Swahili, "Kua Mfano", which means "Be an example". The house's mascot is an eagle symbolizing the quick minded residents ("Kennedians"). Red is the house theme color and stands for boldness and strength.

=== Kivebulaya House ===
"Kivites" have their house named after Apolo Kivebulaya (1864–1933) who was an outstanding missionary and evangelist of the 19th century. He was baptized in 1895 and became a catechist to the Anglican missionaries. In 1896 he was sent to Boga, in current day Eastern Democratic Republic of the Congo, as a missionary, when the chief there requested a Christian teacher. As a result of how he patiently bore his trials, his testimony won over the people of Boga, and eventually even the chief converted. Kivebulaya expanded his ministry to include literacy training. He was ordained a deacon in 1900 and priest in 1903. In 1922, he was named a canon, in recognition of his work which became the core of what in 1972 became a separate diocese, now part of the Church of Christ – Province of the Anglican Church in the Congo. Kivebulaya died on May 30, 1933. Kivebulaya house (also known as "Kiv" today) was formerly known as "Canna Lily", and its theme colour is white.

=== Rhoda Nsibambi House ===
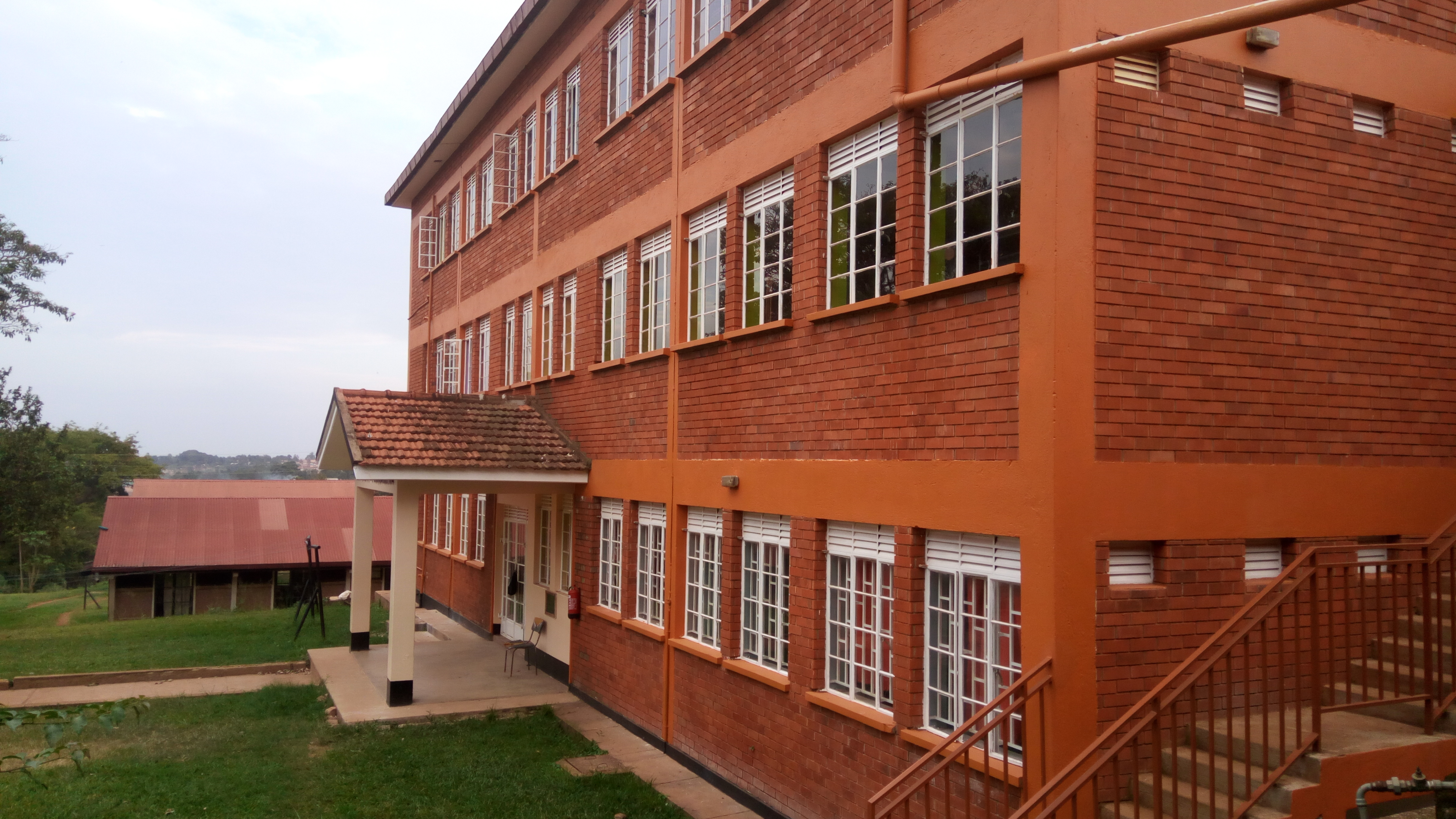
Rhoda Nsibambi House

"Rhoda", the home of "Rhodesians", is the newest dormitory on the Gayaza High School campus. It was opened when the school celebrated 100 years in 2005. It is named after the Rhoda Nsibambi, former wife of the past Prime Minister of Uganda, Apolo Nsibambi. She was head girl of the school in 1958, then an influential old girl who served diligently in the education sector and for Gayaza High School as a chairperson of the Parents Teachers Association, and a member of the board of governors of the school. She died in December 2001. The house's theme colour is grey.

=== Sherborne (Mary Stuart) House ===
Sherborne House was named after Sherborne School for Girls in Dorset, UK, which offered Gayaza High School grants and service for many years in the past. The then headmistress of the Sherborne School somehow learned that the Gayaza girls of that time used to go without breakfast. She collected money for this cause. Sherborne further contributed funds to purchase equipment, furniture and bursaries for the girls at Gayaza. Evidently, the table tennis (recreation) room was also built with the money collected in memory of their head girl, who died in an accident. Girls who reside in Sherborne house are known as "Sherbonites" and the theme colour of their house is yellow.

Mary Stuart, which is the senior section of Sherborne house, was the first tiled dormitory, and was named after the wife of Cyril Stuart, who was bishop of Uganda from 1932 to 1952. She was a great advocate of girls' and women's education. Mary Stuart House was first the seniors' dormitory, and then was for head girls and prefects (other than house prefects), before it became the HSC block for Sherborne House. Mary Stuart lived to be 99 years and 364 days old. She died in 2000.

== Mehta Library ==
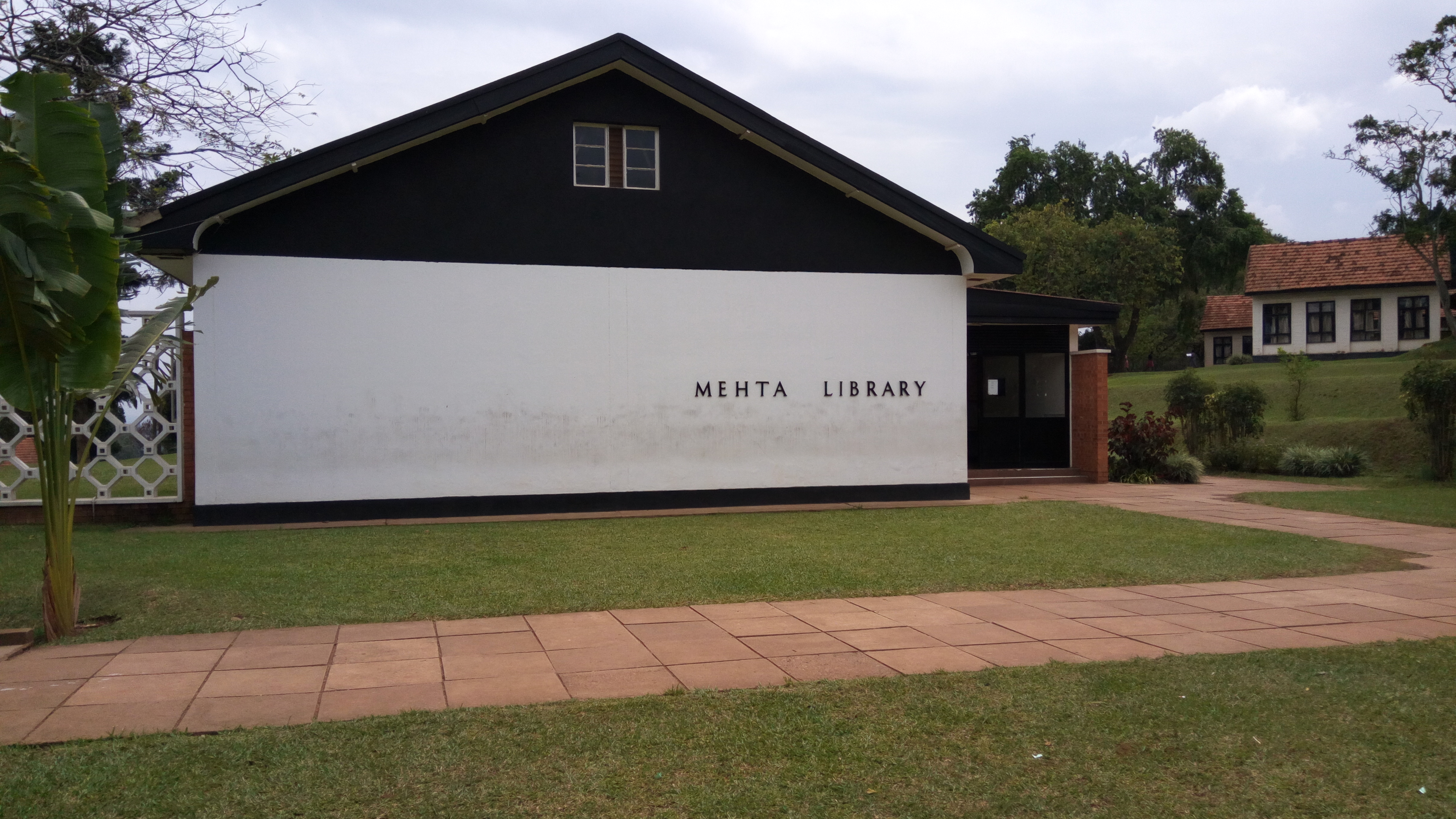
Mehta Library

In 1962, Mehta Library was opened by Mehta J.B. It contains magazines, newspapers, textbooks, and educational literature novels. The students use the library for personal reading, research meetings, and seminars.

== Reputation ==
In 2009, Gayaza High School was ranked as the 68th best high school in Africa.

== Notable alumni ==
- Barbara Allimadi – politician, human rights activist
- Princess Elizabeth Bagaaya – princess, lawyer, diplomat, politician, model
- Nana Kagga – actress, producer, director, petroleum engineer
- Allen Kagina – administrator and businesswoman; commissioner-general of Uganda Revenue Authority 2004–2014
- Maggie Kigozi – physician, businesswoman, sportswoman and farmer; currently management consultant at UNIDO; formerly executive director of Uganda Investment Authority
- Bertha Kingori – one of the first women appointed to the Legislative Council of Tanganyika
- Maria Kiwanuka – economist, businesswoman and politician; former Finance Minister of Uganda (2011–2015)
- Philippa Ngaju Makobore – Ugandan electrical engineer, head of the Instrumentation Division at Uganda Industrial Research Institute
- Margaret Mungherera (25 October 1957 – 4 February 2017) – former senior consultant psychiatrist, Mulago National Referral Hospital, former president of Uganda Medical Association, former president of World Medical Association (2013–2014)
- Proscovia Margaret Njuki – Ugandan electrical engineer, chairperson of the board of directors of Uganda Electricity Generation Company Limited
- Monica Azuba Ntege – civil engineer and politician; Cabinet Minister of Works and Transport in the Cabinet of Uganda, since 2016
- Grania Rubomboras – electrical engineer and corporate executive; regional project manager at the Nile Equatorial Lakes Subsidiary Action Program (NELSAP), Interconnection of Electric Grids Project, based in Kigali, Rwanda
- Julia Sebutinde – presiding judge, International Criminal Court, The Hague, Netherlands
- Jean Namayega Sseninde – professional soccer player with the London Phoenix ladies team, in the English Second League

== See also ==
- Education in Uganda
- Julia Sebutinde
