= Dennis Kasumba =

Ugandan baseball player (born 2003)

- Designated hitter / Pinch hitter / Catcher
- Born: September 2, 2003 (age 22); Gayaza, Uganda
- Bats: Right Throws: Right
- Stats at Baseball Reference

Teams
- Frederick Keys (2023)

Dennis Kasumba (born September 2, 2003) is a Ugandan baseball player. Raised in extreme poverty, he received attention on social media, which led him to playing a season with the Frederick Keys.

== Biography ==
Kasumba was born on September 2, 2003, in Gayaza. His father was a soldier who died fighting rebels during the Lord's Resistance Army insurgency. When he was two months old, he and his two older siblings were abandoned by their mother at their grandmother's house. He grew up in a now-demolished slum in Wakiso Town, a suburb of Kampala, with seven family members in a one-room house without running water or furniture. He grew up playing association football, first playing baseball at age eight.

At age 8 or 14, Kasumba quit school and found work at a slaughterhouse to feed his family. He later met Paul Wafula, a local volunteer baseball coach, who offered to feed him if he played. He later offered to pay for the remainder of his education if he continued playing. More than six of the players on his team – a mixed-sex team – are orphans. He exercises two hours every morning and evening, using makeshift equipment made from discarded bricks, tires, and water bottles. He uploaded his workouts to social media, one of them getting the attention of Shohei Ohtani. Ohtani's attention brought him to Japan to tryout for a major-league team, though failed to receive a contract. He later played five seasons for an independent Japanese team, as well as a season with the Uganda national baseball team. He was denied a visa for the United States twice, due to not having proof of family in the country. An Atlanta attorney began a campaign to let him play in the MLB Draft League. In 2023, he was granted a visa, after which he played a season with the Frederick Keys.

Kasumba has been labelled an undeveloped talent. Standing at 5 ft 6 in (1.68 m) and weighing 156 pounds, the Los Angeles Times described him as "more suited to a soccer midfielder than to a catcher". Playing for the Keys, he went 0–for–19 and was struck out 15 times, which his manager said was caused by not having practiced against c. 90-mile-per-hour (140 km/h) pitches.
