= Namulonge =

- Location in Uganda
- Coordinates: 00°31′30″N 32°36′54″E
- Country: Uganda
- Region: Central Uganda
- District: Wakiso District
- County: Kyaddondo
- Constituency: Kyaddondo North
- Elevation: 3,810 ft (1,160 m)

Namulonge is a location in the Central Region of Uganda.

== Location ==
Namulonge is located in North Kyaddondo Constituency, Kyaddondo County, Wakiso District, in the Central Region of Uganda. Its location is approximately 10 kilometres (6.2 mi), by road, north of Gayaza. This location is approximately 30 kilometres (19 mi), by road, northeast of Kampala, Uganda's capital city. The coordinates of Namulonge are:00 31 30N, 32 36 54E (Latitude:0.5250; Longitude:32.6150).

== Overview ==
Namulonge is a small town where the main employer is the National Crops Resources Research Institute, a public agricultural research institution. A civilian airport, Namulonge Airport, belonging to Namulonge Agronometry Station is located there. There is a golf course in town.

== Population ==
The exact population of Namulonge is not known, as of January 2010.

== Points of interest ==
The following points of interest lie within Namulonge or close to her borders:

- The National Crop Research Institute
- Namulonge Agronometry Station - A government-owned meteorological station
- Mary Louise Sumkins Memorial Golf Course - A private golf course
- Namulonge Airport - A small civilian airport belonging to Namulonge Agronometry Station
- The Gayaza-Ziroobwe Road - The road cuts through town in a south to north direction
