= Bugema University =

Private university in Uganda

Bugema University (BMU)
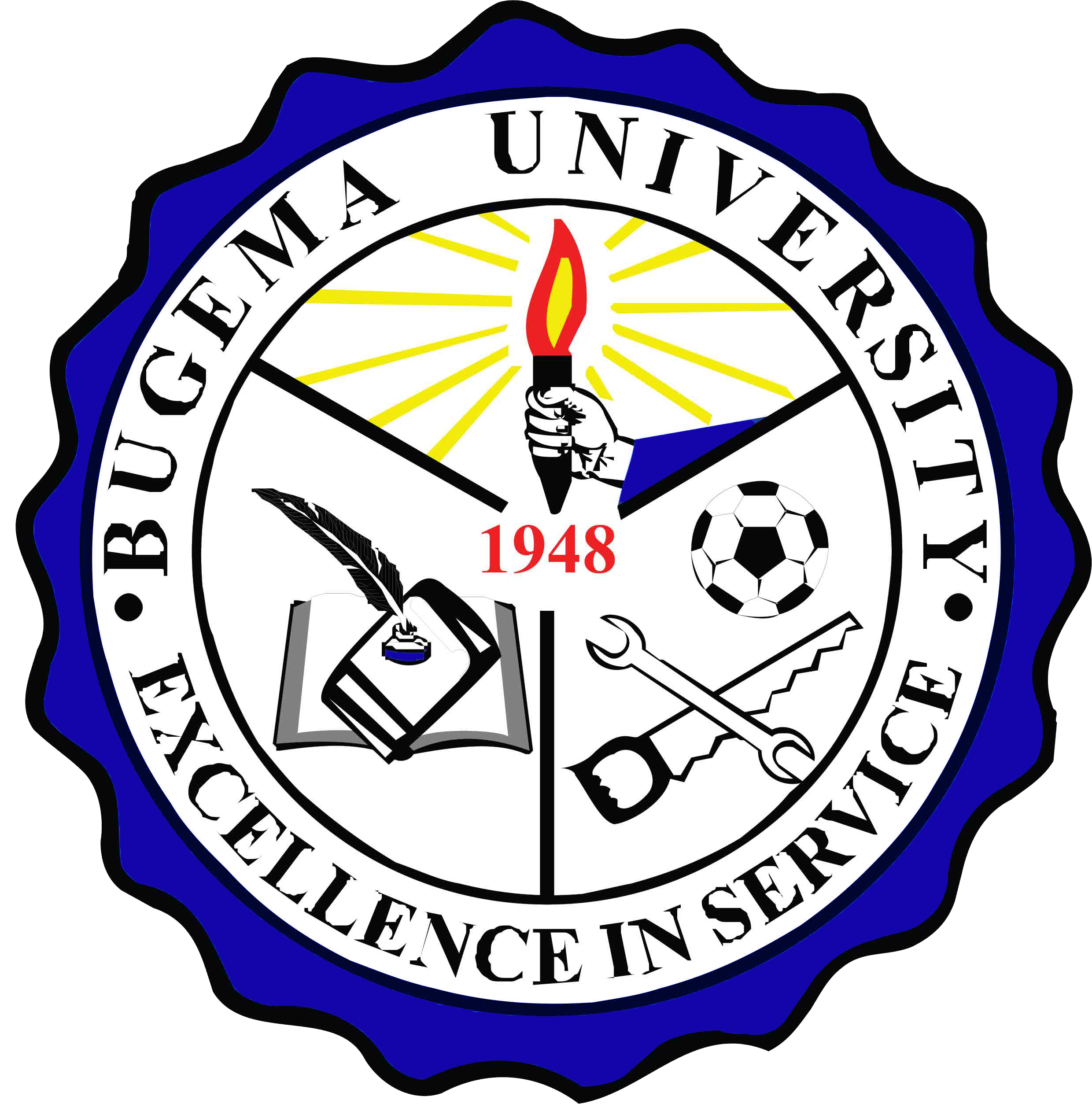
- Motto: Excellence in Service
- Type: Private
- Established: 1948
- Chancellor: Pr. Moses Ndimukika Maka
- Vice-Chancellor: Prof. Israel M Kafeero
- Location: Bugema; Luwero District, Uganda; 00°34′11″N 32°38′31″E
- Campus: Rural
- Website: Homepage
- Location within Uganda

Bugema University (BMU) is a private, co-educational Ugandan university affiliated with the Seventh-day Adventist Church. It is a part of the Seventh-day Adventist education system, the world's second largest Christian school system.

== Location ==
The university is on land that measures 640 acres (1.00 mi^{2}), in Kalagala sub-county, Bamunanika county, Luweero District in the Central Region of Uganda. The main campus is approximately 33 kilometres (21 mi), by road, northeast of Kampala, Uganda's capital and largest city. It is approximately 18.1 kilometres (11 mi), by road, south of the town of Ziroobwe, on the Gayaza–Ziroobwe Road. The coordinates of Bugema University campus are 0°34'11.0"N, 32°38'31.0"E (Latitude:0.569722; Longitude:32.641944).

== History ==
The institution started in 1948 as a training school for teachers and pastors for the Seventh-day Adventist Church in East Africa. At that time it was called Bugema Missionary Training School. Later, the name changed to Bugema Missionary College and then to Bugema Adventist College.

In 1976 Bugema Adventist College received authorization from the Uganda Ministry of Education and the General Conference of Seventh-day Adventists to offer a BTh degree. The college had applied to offer a BA in theology, but the Ministry of Education denied the application because at that time only Makerere University was permitted to offer academic degrees. There were about 35 students in the program. The professors were Pastor and Mrs. Villagomez, and Pastor Gary Fordham. After President Idi Amin banned the Seventh-day Adventist church in 1977, the program was temporarily moved to Nairobi where the first degree students graduated with a BTh degree in 1978. The campus was then relocated to the church's youth camp (at Watamu just north of Mombasa) until Amin fled Uganda. While the college was at Watamu, Reuben Mugerwa finished his graduate degree at Andrews University and joined the faculty. The college was then moved back to the Bugema campus.

The college expanded. By the late 1980s curricula for Business and Education were added. In 1994, Bugema Adventist College changed its status from "college" to "university". In 1997, Bugema University was granted a tertiary institution license from the Ministry of Education and Sports.

== Academic divisions ==
Bugema University is composed of the following schools:

=== School of Science and Technology ===
- Department of Computing and Informatics
- Department of Life and Physical Sciences

=== School of Business ===
- Department of Accounting and Finance
- Department of Management

=== School of Social Sciences ===
- Department of Developmental Studies
- Department of Social Work
- Department of Theology and Religious Studies

=== School of Education ===
- Department of Arts
- Department of Science
- Department of Languages

=== School of Natural Sciences ===
- Department of life and physical sciences
- Department of Agriculture
- Department of Food and Human Nutrition

=== School of Graduate Studies ===
Bugema University's School of Graduate Studies is affiliated with the University of Eastern Africa, Baraton in Kenya with some of the postgraduate courses. The school is also affiliated with Central Luzon State University with some of the postgraduate courses and serves as a center of e-learning on some Doctoral programs offered at Central Luzon State University in the Philippines.

== Academic courses ==
The academic courses offered at BU include the following:

=== Undergraduate degree programs ===
- Bachelor of Business Administration in Accounting
- Bachelor of Business Administration in Finance
- Bachelor of Business Administration in Marketing
- Bachelor of Business Administration in Management
- Bachelor of Business Administration in Office Administration
- Bachelor of Business Administration in Economics
- Bachelor of Business Administration in Business Information Systems
- Bachelor of Business Administration in International Trade
- Bachelor of Business Administration in Entrepreneurship
- Bachelor of Arts with Education
- Bachelor of Science with Education
- Bachelor of Arts in Development Studies
- Bachelor of Science in Counseling
- Bachelor of Social Work and Social Administration
- Bachelor of Theology
- Bachelor of Arts in Religious Studies

=== Postgraduate degree programs ===
- Master of Business Administration
- Master of Science in Information Systems
- Master of Science in Software Engineering and Application Development
- Master of Science in Network Security
- Master of Science in Counseling
- Master of Arts in Education Management
- Master of Arts in Development Studies
- Master of Arts in English Literature
- Master of Science in Education
- Master of Professional Studies in Education
- Master of Science in Rural Development
- Master of Professional Studies in Rural Development
- Master in Local Government Management
- Doctor of Philosophy in Developmental Education
- Doctor of Philosophy in Rural Development
- Doctor of Philosophy in Developmental Communication

=== Diploma courses ===
- Diploma in Accounting
- Diploma in Marketing
- Diploma in Office Administration
- Diploma in Information Technology
- Diploma in Education
- Diploma in Humana Resource Management
- Diploma in Procurement and Supply Chain Management
- Diploma in Office Administration and Secretarial Studies

=== Short certificate courses ===
- Certificate in Small Business Computer Networks
- Certificate in Office Automation and Data management
- Certificate in Computer Repair and Maintenance
- Certificate in Information Technology (For 2 years)
- Certificate in Nursing (For 2 1/2 years)

=== Bridging Courses ===
- Higher Education Certificate (For 8 Months)

== See also ==
- List of Seventh-day Adventist colleges and universities
- Seventh-day Adventist education
- Seventh-day Adventist theology
- History of the Seventh-day Adventist Church
- Adventist Colleges and Universities
- Adventist University of Africa
- Education in Uganda
- List of universities in Uganda
