= Ziroobwe =

- Map of Uganda showing the location of Ziroobwe
- Coordinates: 00°40′59″N 32°42′04″E
- Country: Uganda
- Region: Central Region of Uganda
- District: Luweero District
- Elevation: 1,100 m (3,600 ft)

Population (2012 Estimate)
  - Total: 5,000
- Time zone: UTC+3 (EAT)

Ziroobwe is a town in Luweero District in the Central Region of Uganda. The correct phonetic spelling in the native Luganda language is "Ziroobwe".

== Location ==
Ziroobwe is approximately 52 kilometres (32 mi), by road, north of Kampala, Uganda's capital and largest city. This is approximately 22 kilometres (14 mi), by road, southeast of Luweero, the site of the district headquarters.

== Population ==
In August 2012, the night-time population of the town was estimated at 5,000, swelling to an estimated 7,000 during working days.

== Points of interest ==
The following additional points of interest are found in or near the town of Ziroobwe: The town hosts (a) the headquarters of Ziroobwe sub-county, an administrative until in Luweero District (b) Ziroobwe Central Market and (c) the offices of Ziroobwe Town Council.

The Gayaza–Ziroobwe Road, ends here. This 37 kilometres (23 mi) road connects Gayaza in Wakiso District to Ziroobwe in Luweero District. The Ziroobwe–Wobulenzi Road starts here and ends at Wobulenzi, about 22 kilometres (14 mi) to the west, on the Kampala–Gulu Highway.

The main campus of Bugema University is located about 15 kilometres (9 mi), by road, south of Ziroobwe on the Gayaza-Ziroobwe Road.

== See also ==
- List of universities in Uganda
- List of cities and towns in Uganda
