= Wobulenzi =

Wobulenzi Wobulenzi Municipality
- Location in Uganda
- Coordinates: 00°43′12″N 32°31′48″E
- Country: Uganda
- Region: Central Region of Uganda
- District: Luweero District
- Elevation: 3,632 ft (1,107 m)

Population (2020 Estimate)
  - Total: 31,000

Wobulenzi is a municipality in Katikamu sub-county, in Luweero District in the Central Region of Uganda.

== Geography ==
Wobulenzi is approximately 47 kilometres (29 mi), by road, north of Kampala, Uganda's capital and largest city, on the highway to Karuma. The road is a busy, all-weather tarmac highway, referred to as the Kampala–Gulu Highway. The coordinates of the town are 0°43'12.0"N, 32°31'48.0"E (Latitude:0.7200; Longitude:32.5300). Wobulenzi sits at an average elevation of 1,107 metres (3,632 ft) above mean sea level.

== Population ==
The 1991 national census enumerated 5,391 people in Wobulenzi. In 2002, the population that year put the town's population at 18,846. In 2014, the national population census and household survey put the population at 27,048.

In 2020, the Uganda Bureau of Statistics (UBOS), estimated the mid-year population of the town at 31,000 inhabitants. UBOS calculated that the population of Wobulenzi Town Council increased at an average rate of 2.36 percent annually between 2014 and 2020.

Historical population
Year	Pop.	±%
1991	5,391	—
2002	18,846	+249.6%
2014	27,048	+43.5%
2020	31,000	+14.6%

== Points of interest ==
In Wobulenzi or near the town, there are several points of interest, including the following:(a) the offices of Wobulenzi Town Council (b) Centenary Bank maintains a branch in Wobulenzi (c) the Kampala–Gulu Highway passes through town in a general south to north direction and (d) the Ziroobwe–Wobulenzi Road ends in town at the highway to Gulu.

In 2005, the New Vision reported that the town was in the process of establishing a new, modern, improved Wobulenzi Town Market, valued at USh:800 million (approx. US$224,400 in 2021 money), with financial support from Movit Uganda Limited, a cosmetics company.

== See also ==
- Luwero Triangle
- List of cities and towns in Uganda
- List of roads in Uganda
