= Luweero =

Place in the Central Region of Uganda

Luweero Luweero Municipality
- Location in Uganda
- Coordinates: 00°49′59″N 32°29′58″E
- Country: Uganda
- Region: Central Region of Uganda
- District: Luweero District
- Elevation: 3,600 ft (1,100 m)

Population (2024 Census)
  - Total: 73,644

Luweero district boundary in Uganda

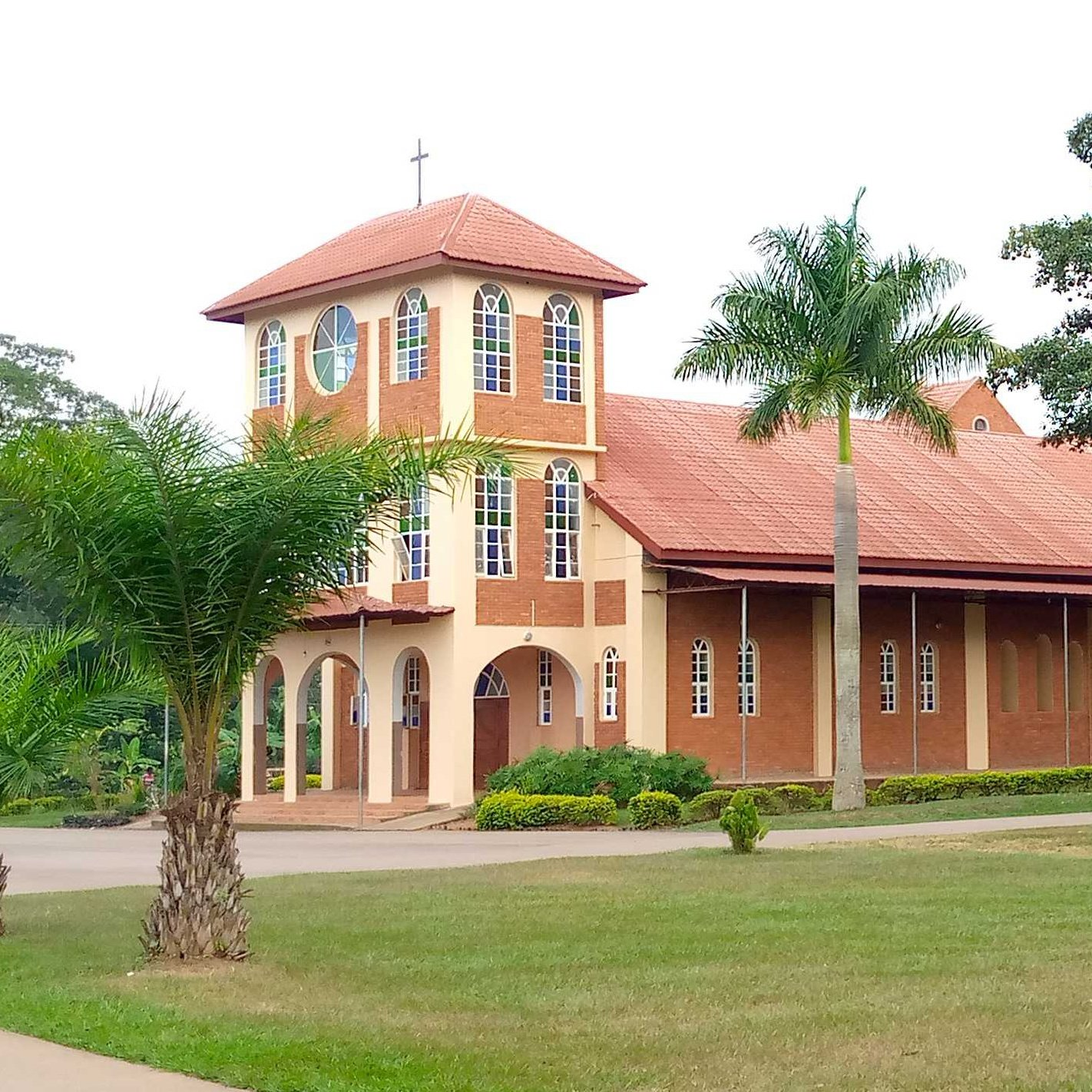
St. Mark's Cathedral in Luweero district

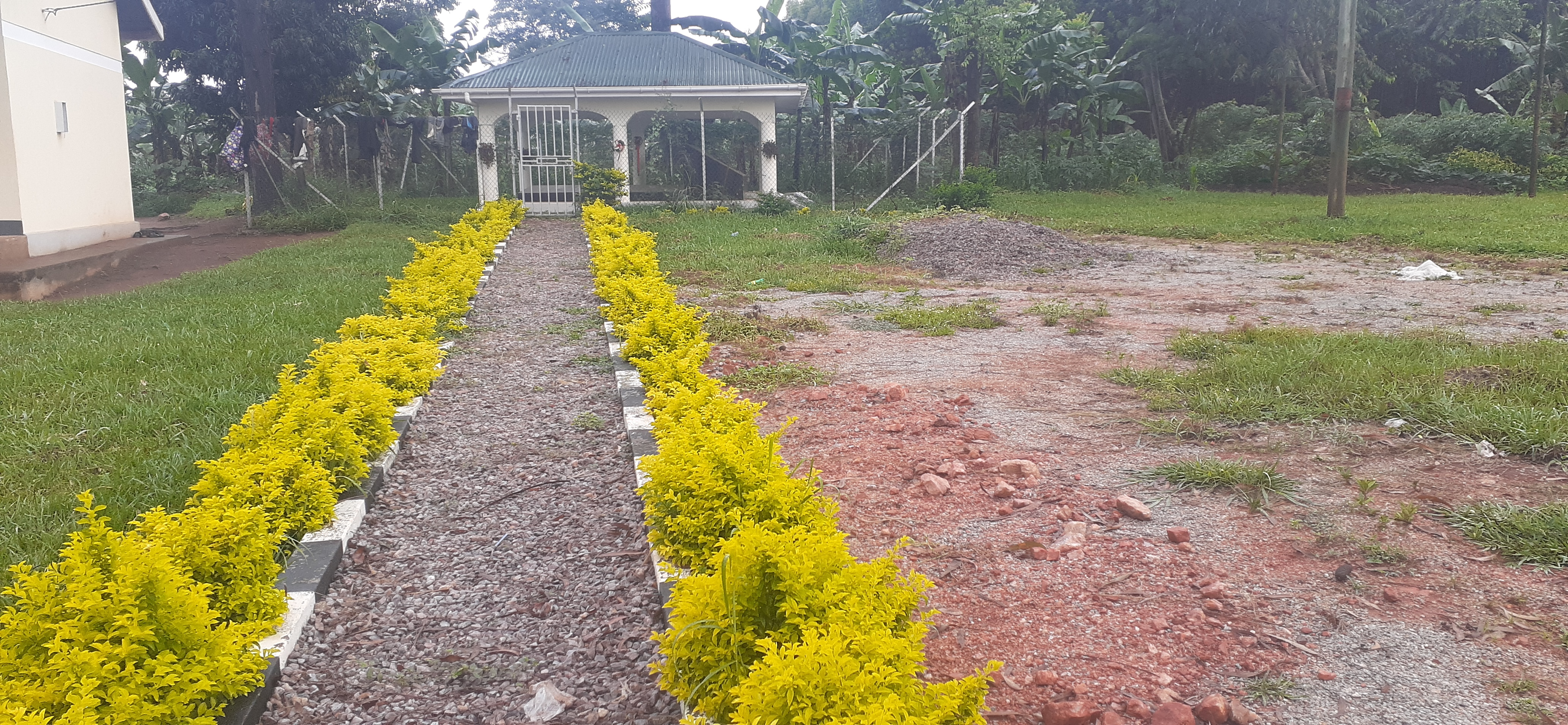
Butuntumula War Memorial, in Luweero

Luweero is a town in the Central Region of Uganda. It is the main municipal, administrative, and commercial center of Luweero District.

== History ==
In 1982, in the Ugandan Civil War, Milton Obote's soldiers raided their village, from Kampala.

== Location ==
Luweero is approximately 62 kilometres (39 mi), by road, north of Kampala, Uganda's capital and largest city, on the highway to Masindi. The road is a busy, all-weather tarmac highway. The coordinates of the town are 0°49'59.0"N, 32°29'58.0"E (Latitude:0.833056; Longitude:32.499444).

== Overview ==
Luweero is one of several municipalities in Luweero District.

== Population ==
The population of the town of Luweero was estimated at 23,500 during the 2002 national census. In 2010, the Uganda Bureau of Statistics (UBOS) estimated the population at approximately 28,800. In 2011, UBOS estimated the mid-year population at 29,500. During the national population census of 2014, the population was enumerated at 42,734.

In 2015, UBOS estimated the population of Luweero Town at 43,700. In 2020, the population agency estimated the mid-year population of the town at 49,100. Of these, 26,100 (53.2 percent) were females and 23,000 (46.8 percent) were males. UBOS calculated that the population of Luweero Town increased at an average estimated rate of 2.4 percent per year, between 2015 and 2020.

Historical population
Year	Pop.	±%
2002	23,500	—
2010	28,800	+22.6%
2011	29,500	+2.4%
2014	42,734	+44.9%
2015	43,700	+2.3%
2020	49,100	+12.4%

== Points of interest ==
In Luweero or near the town, there are several points of interest, including the following:

- Headquarters of Luweero District Administration
- Offices of Luweero Town Council
- Headquarters of the Roman Catholic Diocese of Kasana–Luweero
- Headquarters of the Seventh-day Adventist North Buganda station.(Seventh-day Adventist Church)
- Headquarters of the Anglican Luweero Diocese (Church of Uganda)
- Luweero Central Market
- Headquarters of Wekembe SACCO, a microfinance institution
- Kampala-Masindi highway, passing through the center of town in a north/south alignment
- Luweero-Kasana Health Centre IV, a public health facility.

== See also ==
- Luwero Triangle
- List of cities and towns in Uganda
