= Luweero District =

- District
- District location in Uganda
- Coordinates: 00°50′N 32°30′E
- Country: Uganda
- Region: Central Region of Uganda
- Capital: Luweero

Area
  - Land: 2,217.6 km^{2} (856.2 sq mi)

Population (2014 Census)
  - Total: 458,158
  - Density: 206.6/km^{2} (535/sq mi)
- Time zone: UTC+3 (EAT)
- Website: www.luweero.go.ug

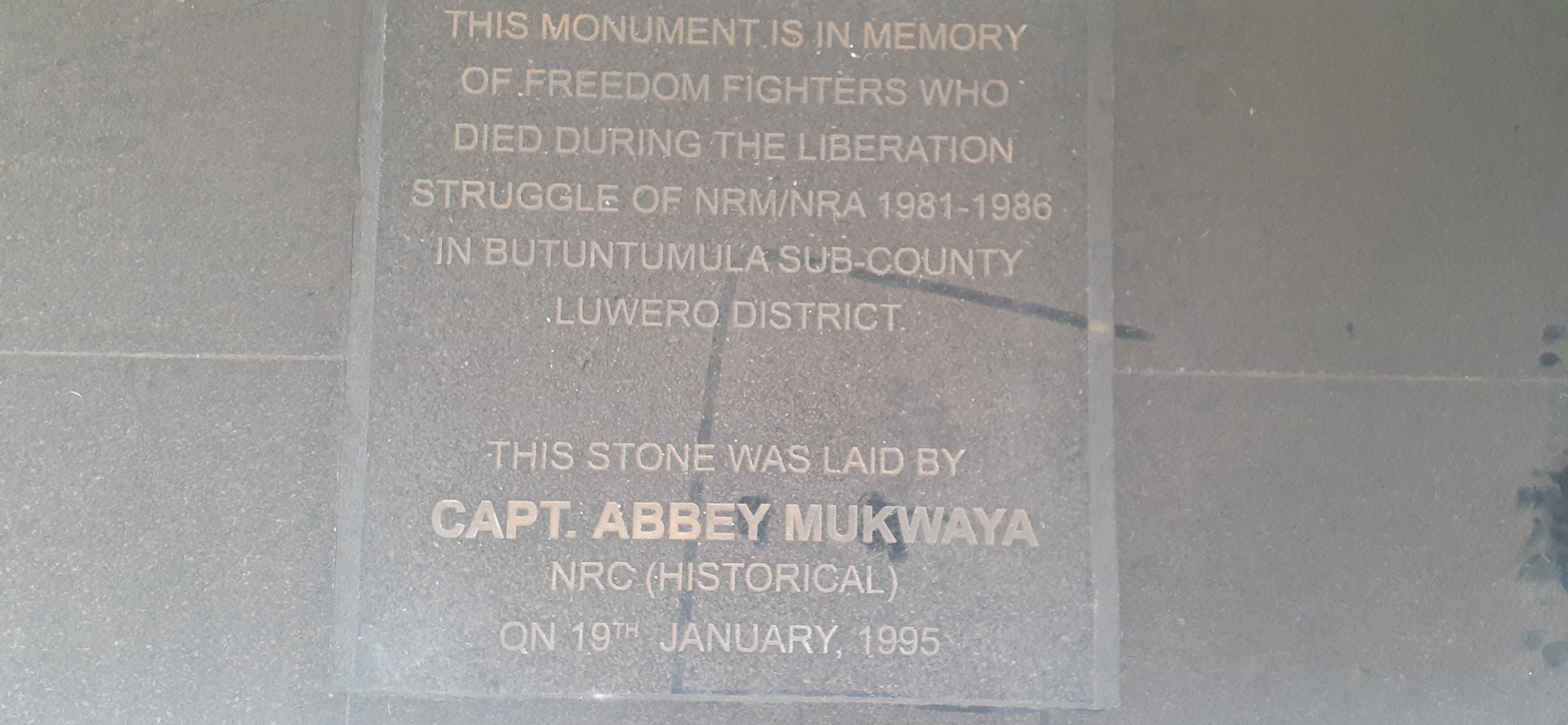
Butuntumula War Memorial Tombstone.

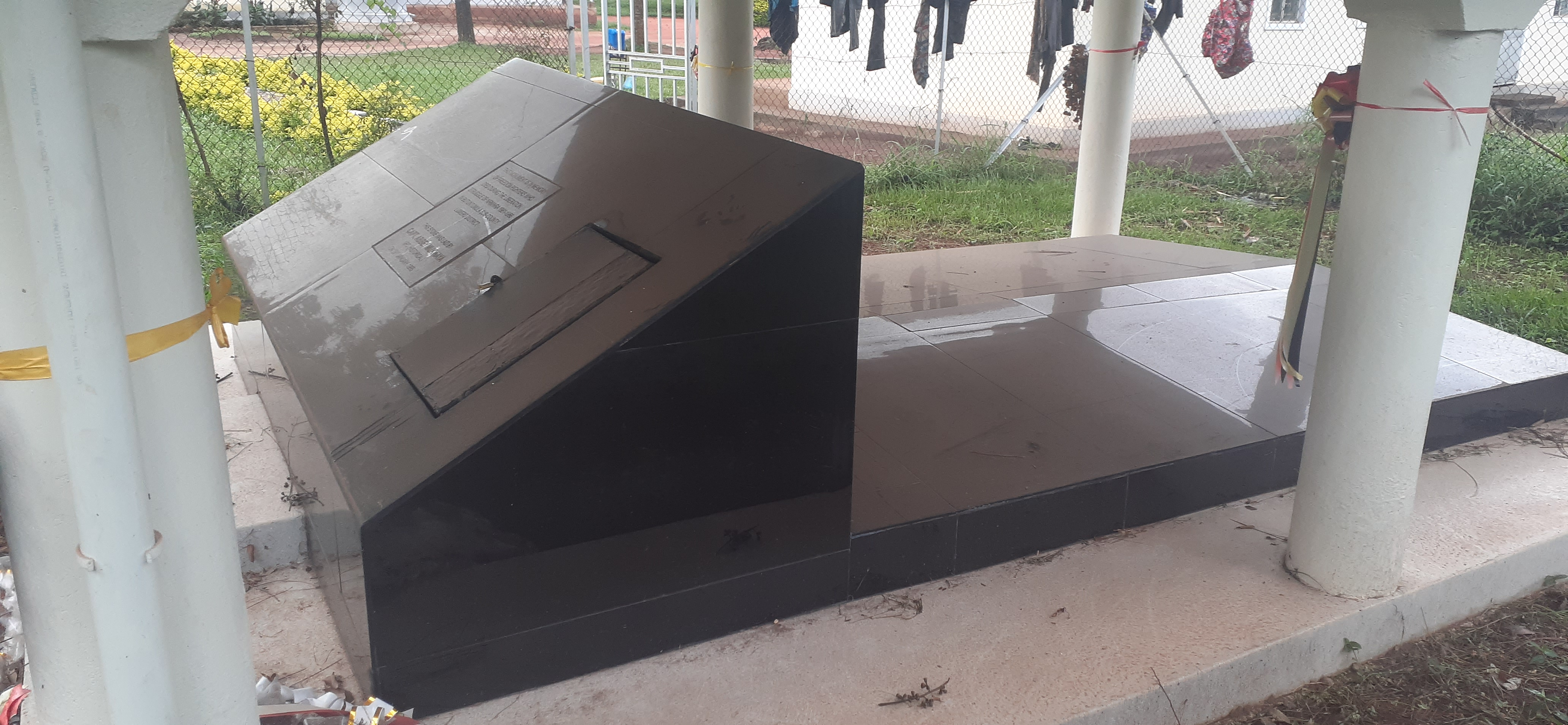
Butuntumula War Memorial Mass Grave.

Luweero District (also spelled as Luwero) is a district in the Central Region of Uganda. Luweero is the site of the district headquarters.

== Location ==
Luweero District is bordered by Nakasongola District to the north, Kayunga District to the east, Mukono District to the southeast, Wakiso District to the south, and Nakaseke District to the west. The district headquarters at Luweero are approximately 75 kilometres (47 mi), by road, north of Kampala, Uganda's capital and largest city. The coordinates of the district are 00 50N, 32 30E (Latitude:0.8333; Longitude:32.500).

== Overview ==
Luweero District was the site of a fierce insurgency by the rebel group National Resistance Army and a brutal counter-insurgency by the government of Milton Obote, known as the Luweero War or the "Bush War", that left many thousands of civilians dead during the early to mid-1980s. The area affected by the war has come to be known as the Luweero Triangle. In 2005, Nakaseke County was split from Luweero District to form Nakaseke District. Luweero District is administered by the Luweero District Administration, with headquarters at Luweero. There are several town councils within the district, each with its own urban town council:

- Bombo
- Luweero
- Wobulenzi
- Bamunanika
- Kalagala
- Kalule
- Ndejje
- Ziroobwe
- Busiika

== Population ==
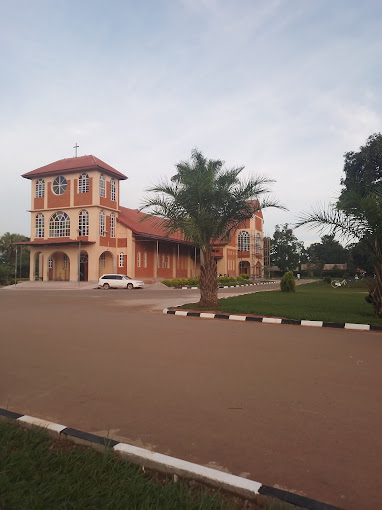
St.Mark's Cathedral, Luweero

The 1991 national census estimated the population of the district at 255,400. The national census conducted in 2002 estimated the population at 341,300.In 2012, the population was estimated at 440,200. The August 2014 national population census enumerated the population at 458,158.

== Economic activities ==
Agriculture is the mainstay of the district economy. It has been estimated that 85 percent of the district population are engaged in agriculture.

== Prominent people ==
- Susan Nalugwa Kiguli is an Ugandan poet and literary scholar.
- Mwanje Gideon, Ugandan lawyer and former President of Uganda Law Students Association

== Points of interest ==
The following additional points of interest are located in Luweero District:

- Main Campus of Bugema University
- Main Campus of Ndejje University
- a branch Campus of Kampala University
- Bamunanika Palace, one of the palaces of the Kabaka of Buganda, located at Bamunanika
- headquarters of the Uganda Land Forces, a unit of the Uganda People's Defence Force, located at Bombo
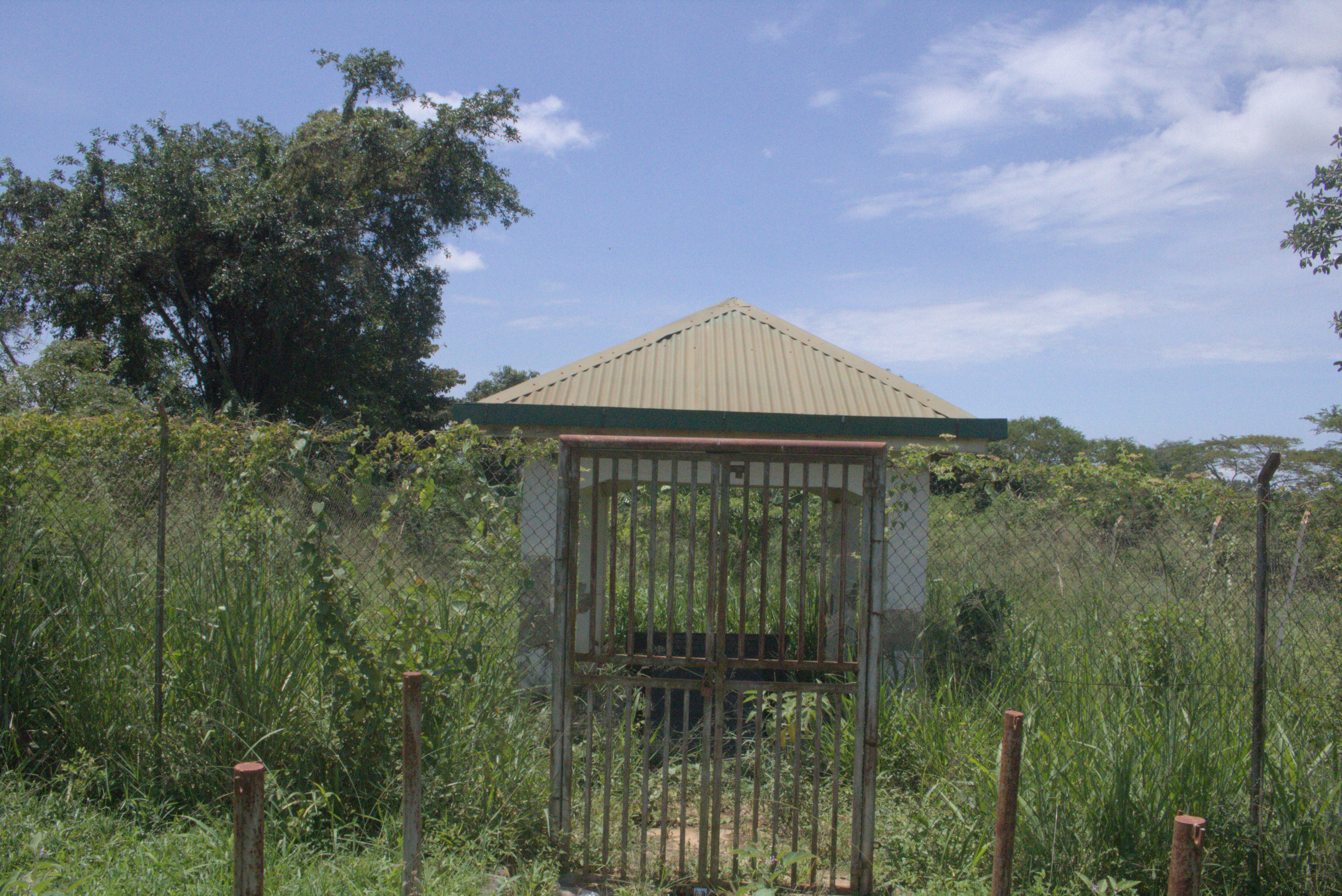
- Wakyato War Memorial
  Bombo Military Hospital, one of the two military hospitals in Uganda, the other being Mbuya Military Hospital

== Schools ==
- Sandton Junior School Wobulenzi
- Light Of Life Nursery & Primary School
- Lugo Orphanage Primary School
- Luweero Sda Primary School
- Luwero Boys Day & Boarding Primary School
- Luwero Girls Primary School
- St Theresa Kisubi Girls Primary School
- Ellen White Bright Future Primary School
- Happy Times Junior School
- Big Step Nursery And Primary School
- Namaliga Church Of Uganda Primary School
- Cream Bakers Junior Primary School
- Donela Orange Primary School
- Little Flower Primary School
- Malayika Parents Primary School
- Al Answari Primary School
- Rapha Primary School Luweero
