= Ngoma, Uganda =

Ngoma
- Map of Uganda showing the location of Ngoma
- Coordinates: 01°10′48″N 32°01′05″E
- Country: Uganda
- Region: Central Uganda
- District: Nakaseke District
- Constituency: Nakaseke North

Government
  - Member of Parliament: Syda Bbumba

Population (2014 census)
  - Total: 6,295
- Time zone: UTC+3 (EAT)

Ngoma is a small town in Nakaseke District, Central Uganda. It is one of the municipalities within Nakaseke District. Other municipalities in the district include: (a) Butalangu (b) Kapeeka (c) Nakaseke (d) Semuto and (e) Wakyaato.

== Location ==
Ngoma is located approximately 83 kilometres (52 mi), by road, northwest of Luweero, the largest town in the sub-region. It lies about 16 kilometres (9.9 mi), by road, north of Nakaseke, where the district headquarters are located. This location is approximately 132 kilometres (82 mi), by road, northwest of Kampala, Uganda's capital and largest city. The coordinates of the town are:1°10'50.0"N 32°01'03.0"E (Latitude:1.180551; Longitude:32.017491).

== Population ==
During the national census and household survey of August 2014, the Uganda Bureau of Statistics (UBOS), enumerated the population of Ngoma at 6,295 people.

== Landmarks ==
The landmarks within the town limits or near the town include: (a) The offices of Ngoma Town Council (b) Ngoma Health Centre IV (c) Ngoma Central Market and (d) Oliver Tambo School of Leadership - Located at Kaweweta, near Ngoma.

== See also ==
- Kaweweta
- Nakaseke District
- Luweero Triangle
- Central Region, Uganda
