= Kathleen Grace Noble =

Irish-Ugandan rower (born 1994)

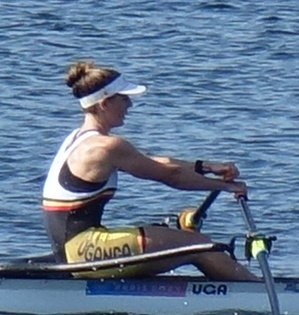
- Kathleen Grace Noble in 2024

Personal information
- Full name: Kathleen Grace Noble
- Nationality: Uganda; Ireland
- Born: 20 December 1994 (age 31) Kiwoko, Nakaseke, Uganda

Sport
- Sport: Swimming, Rowing
- Events: Freestyle, Butterfly
- College team: Princeton Tigers
- Club: Utah Crew

Kathleen Grace Noble (born 20 December 1994) is an Irish-Ugandan rower. She is recognized as the first Ugandan to qualify for rowing at the Olympics in the Women's Single Scull. She is also recognized as having achieved Uganda's best time so far (30.80 seconds) in the 50m butterfly at the FINA World Swimming Championships.

== Background and education ==
Noble was born in Kiwoko Hospital, in the present-day Nakaseke District to Irish parents, Gerry Noble, a doctor, and Moira Noble, a teacher who had come to Uganda as missionaries. Noble attended the then Kabira International School (now Kampala International School) between 1999 and 2004. She later joined the International School of Uganda for secondary in 2004, leaving in 2013. She then joined Princeton University in 2014 and graduated with a degree in Ecology and Evolutionary Biology.

She obtained Ugandan citizenship in 2022.

== Career ==
Based in Utah, she works as a technician in the Schiffman Lab at the Huntsman Cancer Institute in Salt Lake City.

=== Swimming and other sports ===
Noble initially was a swimmer representing her high school and Uganda with 50M butterfly and 50M freestyle as her specialty. Noble was part of the Ugandan team at the 2012 World Swimming Championship in Istanbul, Turkey. In addition, she played volleyball and represented the International School of Uganda in the ISSEA (International Schools of South and East Africa) competitions between 2009 and 2012.

=== Rowing and Olympic qualification ===
After moving to Princeton, Noble got interested in rowing through her room-mate and featured for the Princeton Tigers. In preparation for the 2016 World Championships, Noble took a semester off to train with the Ugandan team. She was recruited and trained under William Mwanga with the Maroons Aqua Sports Club, where she learned how to row in a single boat. According to a Ugandan sports website, Kawowo Sports, Noble's maiden rowing championship for Uganda was during the 2016 World Rowing U23 Championships held in Rotterdam, the Netherlands.

After graduating from university, she moved to Utah, working as a wilderness therapy field instructor working with youth in the desert, teaching survival and communication skills, and resumed training with the Utah Crew under coach Linda Iqbal. She qualified for the 2020 Olympics after winning the 2 km single scull race at the 2019 Africa Rowing Regatta held in Tunisia.

== See also ==
- Uganda at the 2020 Summer Olympics
- Rowing at the 2020 Summer Olympics
- Jamila Lunkuse
- Olivia Aya Nakitanda
- List of Ugandan records in swimming
- International School of Uganda
- Princeton Tigers
