= Rose Namayanja =

Ugandan lawyer and politician (born 1975)

Former Minister of Information and National Guidance
- In office 23 May 2013 – 1 March 2015
- President: Yoweri Museveni
- Prime Minister: Amama Mbabazi and Ruhakana Rugunda
- Preceded by: Mary Karooro Okurut
- Succeeded by: Jim Muhwezi

Minister of State for Luweero Triangle
- In office 24 May 2011 – 23 May 2013
- President: Yoweri Museveni
- Prime Minister: Amama Mbabazi
- Preceded by: Thembo Nyombi
- Succeeded by: Sarah Ndobooli Kataike

Member of Parliament from Nakaseke District
- In office May 2006 – February 2016
- Preceded by: District created
- Succeeded by: Sarah Najjuma

Member of Parliament for Youth Central Region
- In office May 2001 – May 2006
- Succeeded by: Kasozi Joseph Muyomba

Personal details
- Born: Rose Namayanja; 18 August 1975 (age 51) Kalagi, Uganda
- Party: National Resistance Movement
- Spouse: Charles Nsereko (m. 2002)
- Education: Makerere University (Bachelor of Arts) (Bachelor of Laws); Cranfield University (MSc in Security Studies)
- Occupation: Deputy Secretary General of the National Resistance Movement

Namayanja Rose Nsereko (born 18 August 1975) is a Ugandan lawyer, columnist, author, security sector manager and politician. She is the current Deputy Secretary General of Uganda's ruling party.

Namayanja is a former National Treasurer of Uganda's ruling party, The National Resistance Movement (NRM). She is also the former Minister of Information and National Guidance in the Cabinet of Uganda, a position she held from 23 May 2013, until 1 March 2015. Prior to that, she served as Minister of State for Luwero Triangle in the Prime Minister's office, from 27 May 2011 until 24 May 2013. She replaced Thembo Nyombi, who was appointed State Minister for Information Technology. Namayanja also served as the elected Member of Parliament for Nakaseke District Women Representative from 2006 to 2016. She was a founder member of the Uganda Young Democrats (UYD), the youth wing of Uganda's Democratic Party (DP) that was known for its radicalism in the mid-1990s.

== Early life and education ==
Namayanja was born in Kalagi, a village in Nakaseke District (one of the Luwero Triangle districts) on 18 August 1975 to Jackson Ssebowa and Catherine Namirembe Ssebowa. A Muganda by tribe, she was born in an Anglican family. She converted to the Seventh-day Adventist Church while in high school. She attended Kabowa Church of Uganda Primary School, for her primary education and Light College Katikamu for her middle and high school education. She holds the degrees of Bachelor of Arts (1998) and Bachelor of Laws (2011), both from Makerere University, the oldest and largest public university in Uganda. She also holds the degree of Master of Science (2010), in Security Sector Management, obtained from and Cranfield University, the Defence Academy of the United Kingdom.

== Career ==
Prior to her senior political career, Namayanja worked as an academic registrar for Light Bureau of Accountancy in 1998. Between 1999 and 2001, she worked as a political officer at State House Kampala. She started her political career as a student and youth leader at Makerere University in 1995. She was a founder member of the Uganda Young Democrats (UYD), the youth wing of Uganda's Democratic Party (DP). According to her, she drew her inspiration from the then young people in politics like the late Nobel Mayombo and further from the powerful women in politics like the former vice president of Uganda, Specioza Naigaga Wandira Kazibwe, Winnie Byanyima, Janat Mukwaya and Cecilia Ogwal. The desire to make a contribution to rebuilding Luwero Triangle, her homeland and the theatre of Yoweri Museveni's liberation war made her aim for more influential political positions.

In 2001 at the age of 25, she was elected as Member of Parliament (MP) representing the youth for Uganda's Central Region, which includes Luwero Triangle, for a five-year term. In 2006, having crossed to the NRM after the introduction of Multi-Party Politics and the creation of Nakaseke District the previous year, Namayanja stood unopposed for the position of Woman MP for Nakaseke District and was reelected in 2011 for a five-year term. In 2011, she was appointed for her first ministerial position as Minister of State for Luwero Triangle in the Office of the Prime Minister (OPM). She held that portfolio until she was appointed Minister of information and National Guidance on 23 May 2013, a position she held until 1 May 2015, when she was dropped from the Cabinet in consideration of the fact that she had been appointed National Treasurer of the National Resistance Movement in January 2015. Namayanja did not contest the 2016 general election. Namayanja is the current Deputy Secretary General of the National Resistance Movement as appointed by the Chairman in 2021.

== Personal life ==
Rose Namayanja is married to Charles Nsereko. They were married in a Seventh-day Adventist ceremony on 2 September 2002. She was the Chairperson of the Uganda Parliamentary Forum for Children. She retired from active elective politics in 2016.

== See also ==
- Cabinet of Uganda
- Parliament of Uganda
- National Resistance Movement
- Democratic Party (Uganda)
- Nakaseke District

Parliament of Uganda
Preceded by Constituency Created	Member of Parliament for Youth Central Region; 2001–2006	Succeeded by Kasozi Joseph Muyomba
Preceded by District Created	Member of Parliament from Nakaseke District; 2006–2016	Succeeded by Sarah Najjuma
Political offices
Preceded by Thembo Nyombi	Minister of State for Luweero Triangle; 2011–2013	Succeeded by Sarah Ndobooli Kataike
Preceded by Mary Karooro Okurut	Minister of Information and National Guidance; 2013–2015	Succeeded by Jim Muhwezi
Preceded by Amelia Kyambadde	National Treasurer of the National Resistance Movement; 2015 – present	Incumbent
