= Enock Nyongore =

Ugandan politician

Honourable Enock Nyongore
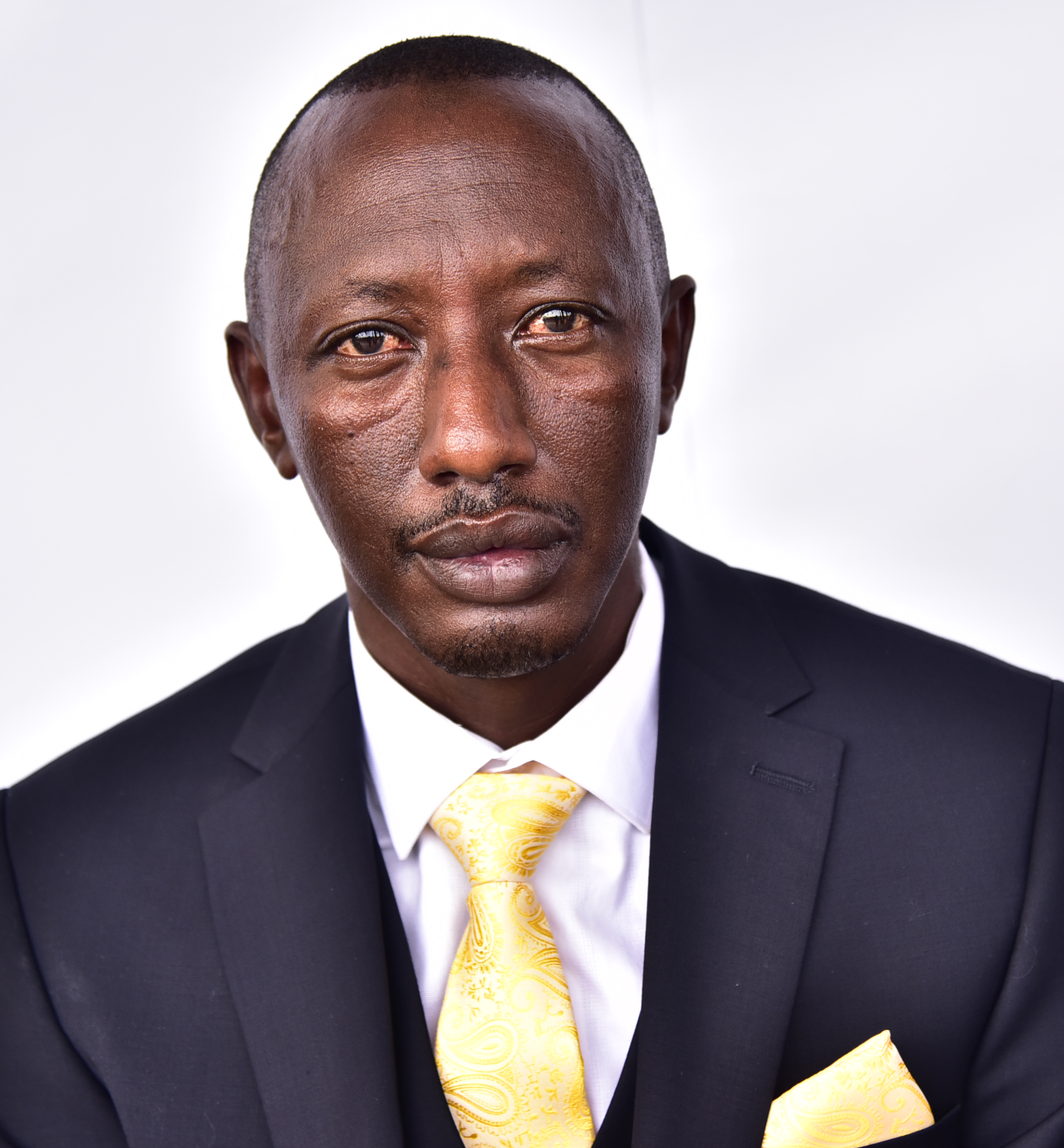
- Enock Nyongore

Member of the Parliament of Uganda
- Incumbent
- Assumed office 24 May 2021
- Preceded by: Syda Bbumba
- Constituency: Nakaseke North, Nakaseke District

Personal details
- Born: September 25, 1973 (age 52)
- Party: National Resistance Movement

Enock Nyongore (born on 25 September 1973), is a Ugandan politician who serves as a Member of Parliament of Uganda .

== Career ==
Nyongore worked as a teacher before entering politics. He previously served as the Nakaseke District Speaker from 2011 to 2016. He also ran for chairperson of Ngoma town council, a race that he lost. He returned to the political scene after the split of Nakaseke county, which was previously represented in Parliament by Hajjati Bumba. Nyongore was elected to the 11th parliament in the 2021 Ugandan general election.
