= Adara Group =

International development NGO

- Formation: 1998
- Type: NGO, Business for Purpose
- Purpose: Corporate Advisory/International Development
- Headquarters: Sydney
- Location(s): Australia; Uganda; Nepal
- Director: Audette Exel
- Website: www.adaragroup.org

The Adara Group (formerly the ISIS Group) is a partnership between an international development organisation Adara Development (formerly the ISIS Foundation) and two corporate advisory businesses Adara Advisors Pty. Limited (formerly ISIS Asia Pacific) and Adara Partners (Australia) Pty Limited. The Adara Group is focused on improving health and education for people living in poverty. The organisation was founded in Bermuda in 1998 by New Zealand-born business woman Audette Exel.

== Name ==
The organisation was originally called the ISIS Group, after Isis, the Egyptian goddess of children and motherhood. In 2014, due to the rise of the Islamic State, the ISIS Group changed its name to the Adara Group.

== History ==
The Adara Group was co-founded in 1998 in Bermuda by Audette Exel and a small group of friends. Soon after formation, Adara Development began to conduct development research in Humla, Nepal, and also fostered connections with Kiwoko Hospital in the Luwero Triangle, Uganda.

In 2002, it registered as a charitable trust in the United Kingdom.

In 2009, Adara Development (USA) (formerly ISIS Foundation (USA)) was set up and in 2011 it received 501(c) status.

== The Adara model ==
The Adara model is a business/not-for-profit partnership. Profits made by the private businesses Adara Advisors and Adara Partners are directed towards covering the core support costs of Adara Development.

=== Adara Partners ===
In June 2015, the Adara Group launched a new business - Adara Partners. The company was launched with the support of the Founding Panel Members for Adara Partners including Australian businessman David Gonski. These Panel Members work for Adara Partners pro bono.

== Adara's work ==
Adara Development’s work focuses on the alleviation of poverty through health and education services. They mainly work with rural communities in Nepal and Uganda. Since their founding, Adara has worked in disaster relief post the 2015 Nepal earthquake, worked with children who have been trafficked in Nepal and established neonatal units for premature babies in Uganda.

Adara Development began partnering with Nepalese local NGOs, like The Himalayan Innovative Society. It has also partnered with the Himalayan Children Society.

== See also ==
- Kiwoko Hospital
- conscious business
