= Matugga–Kapeeka Road =

Road in Uganda

Coordinates: 00°37′33″N 32°19′13″E

Route information
- Length: 26 mi (42 km)
- History: Designated in 2008; Completion in 2010

Major junctions
- South end: Matugga
- Semuto
- North end: Kapeeka

Location
- Country: Uganda

Highway system
- Roads in Uganda

Matugga–Kapeeka Road is a road in central Uganda, connecting the towns of Matugga in Wakiso District and Kapeeka in Nakaseke District.

== Location ==
The road goes through Gombe in Wakiso District, Kirolo and Semuto in Nakaseke District, a total distance of approximately 42.5 kilometres (26.4 mi), from end to end.

== Overview ==
Prior to 2009, the road had a gravel surface. In 2008, the government of Uganda began to upgrade the road from gravel to bitumen at an estimated cost of US$20 million. 65 percent of the funding was provided by the government while 35 percent was provided by the Nordic Development Fund. The work was carried out by the Chongqing International Construction Corporation. COWI A/S, a Danish consultancy firm, supervised the work. Construction was completed in the second half of 2010. It was reported in October 2010 that completion would occur as planned, in December 2010.

== See also ==
- List of roads in Uganda
