= Kaweweta =

- Map of Uganda showing the location of Kaweweta
- Coordinates: 01°14′45″N 32°10′46″E
- Country: Uganda
- Region: Central Region of Uganda
- District: Nakaseke District
- Constituency: Nakaseke North

Government
  - Member of Parliament: Syda Bbumba
- Elevation: 1,160 m (3,810 ft)
- Time zone: UTC+3 (EAT Directions)

Kaweweta is a settlement in Nakaseke District of the Central Region of Uganda.

== Location ==
Kaweweta is located in Ngoma sub-county, Nakaseke District, approximately 81 kilometres (50 mi) northwest of Luweero, in Luweero District, the nearest large town. This is northeast of Butalangu, the location of Nakaseke District headquarters and about 142 kilometres (88 mi), by road, northwest of Kampala, the capital and largest city in Uganda. The coordinates of Kaweweta are: 01°14'45.0"N, 32°10'46.0"E (Latitude:1.245833; Longitude:32.179444).

== Overview ==
Kaweweta is the location of the "Oliver Tambo School of Leadership", an installation of the Uganda People's Defence Force (UPDF). Established in 1989 to house freedom fighters (Umkonto we Sizwe) of the African National Congress (ANC), the installation, over the years turned into a training camp for both the ANC from South Africa and the National Resistance Army (NRA) from Uganda. By 1994, it housed 3,000 South African soldiers, of whom 14 died of natural causes and are buried at Kaweweta.

During the 2000s, the present-day school was constructed at a cost of US$4.5 million, with South Africa contributing US$3 million (about USh6 billion) and Uganda providing US$1.5 million (about USh3 billion) for the construction. The school consists of 13 buildings, a water supply system, an electricity supply network that runs on solar energy and diesel generator power, a hospital, staff houses, an administration block and a hall which can hold up to 600 people. This school, which is expected to be a regional ideological and leadership institution officially opened in March 2010.

The second military installation in Kaweweta is the "Samora Machel UPDF Special Forces School", which opened in 2016. The infrastructure was erected by the Special Forces Command engineers led by Major Emmanuel Odongo and Lieutenant Chabo.

== See also ==
- List of cities and towns in Uganda
- List of roads in Uganda
