= Kabonero =

Kabonero is a surname. Notable people with the surname include:

- Bob Kabonero (born 1965), Ugandan businessman and entrepreneur
- Richard Kabonero (born 1963), Ugandan civil servant and diplomat, brother of Bob
