= Matugga =

Town in Central Region, Uganda

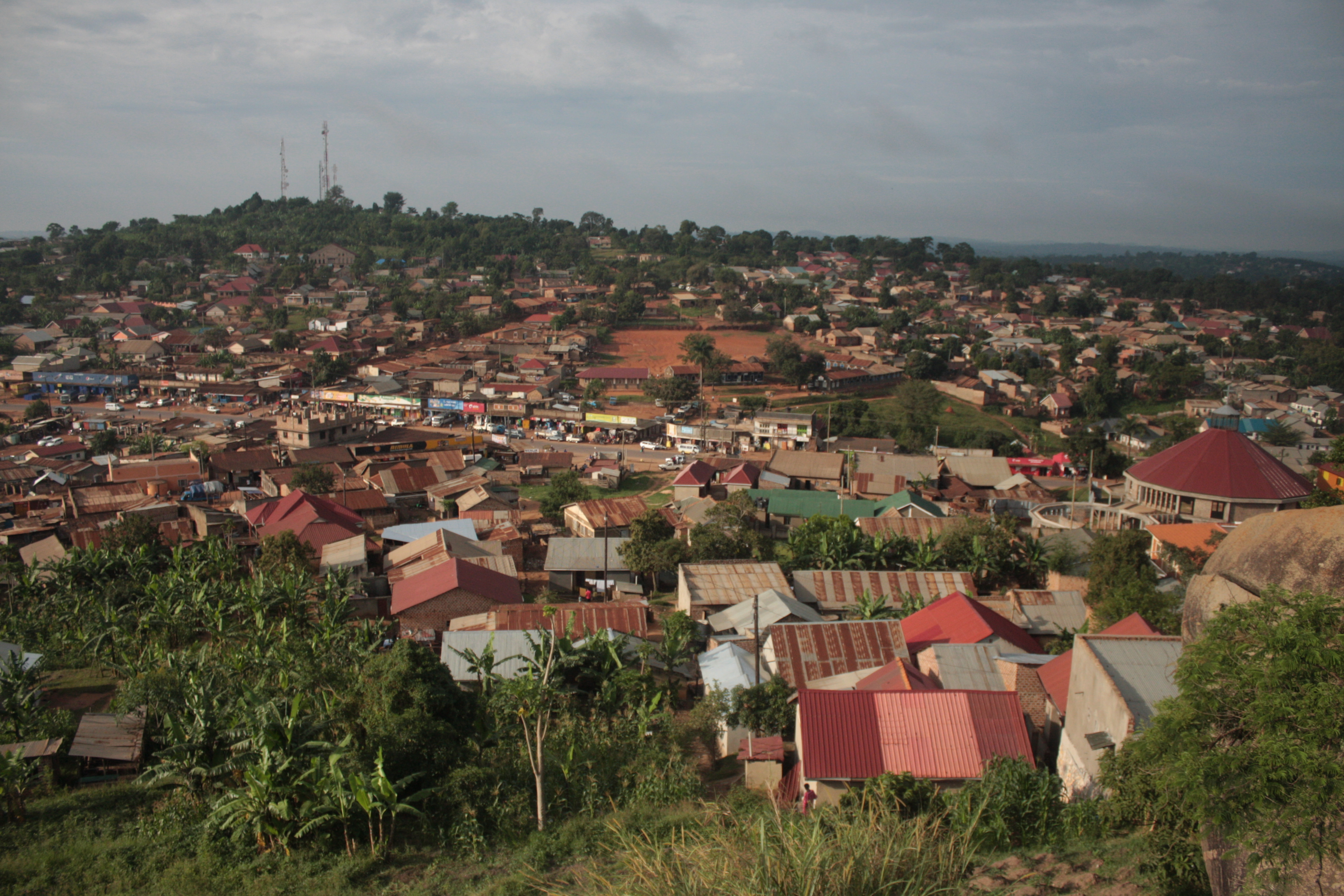
- Matugga

- Map of Uganda showing the location of Matugga.
- Coordinates: 00°27′37″N 32°31′43″E
- Country: Uganda
- Region: Central Region
- District: Wakiso District
- County: Kyaddondo
- Constituency: Kyaddondo North

Population (2010 Estimate)
  - Total: 15,000
- Time zone: UTC+3 (EAT)

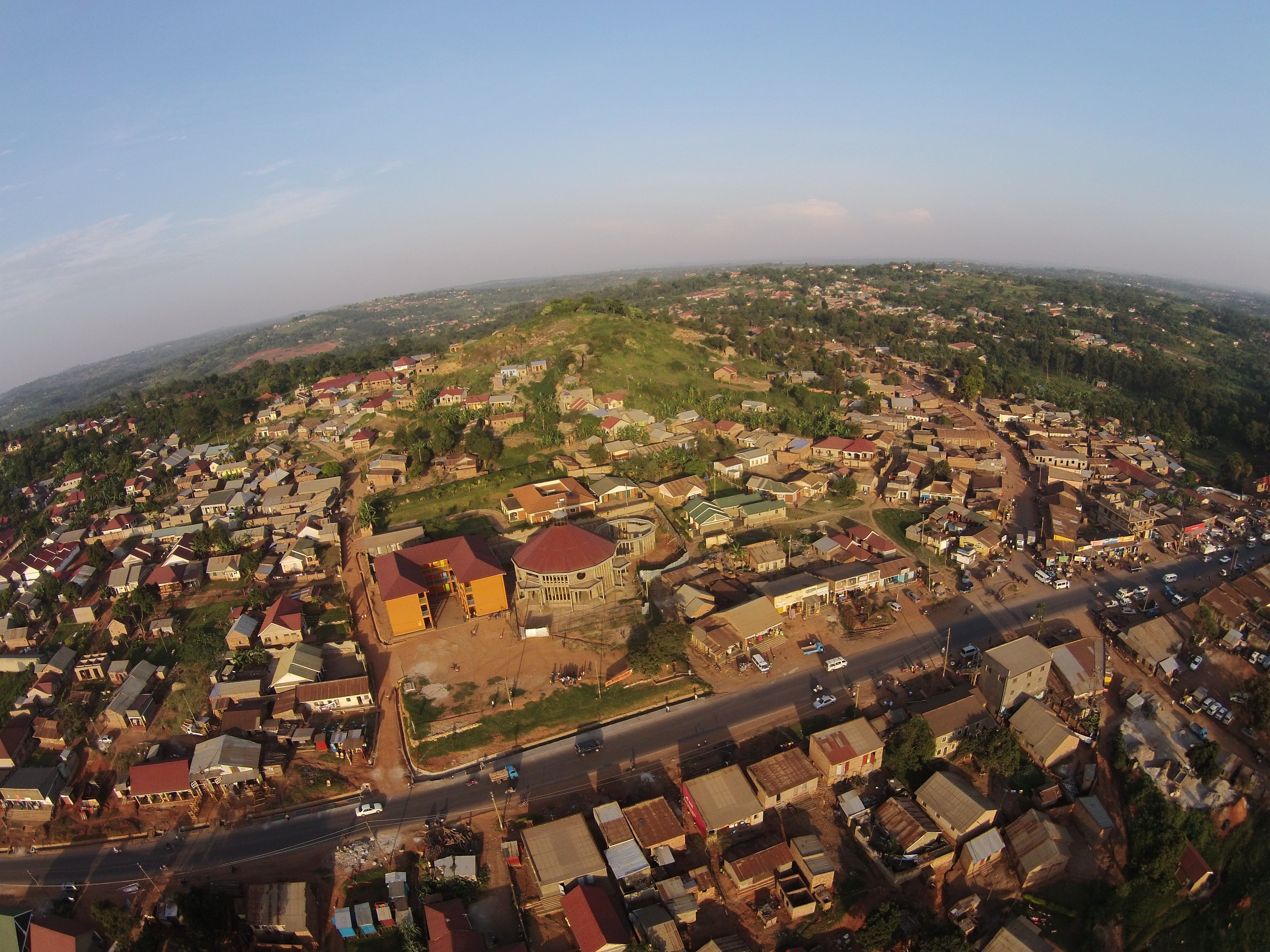
Matugga Hill

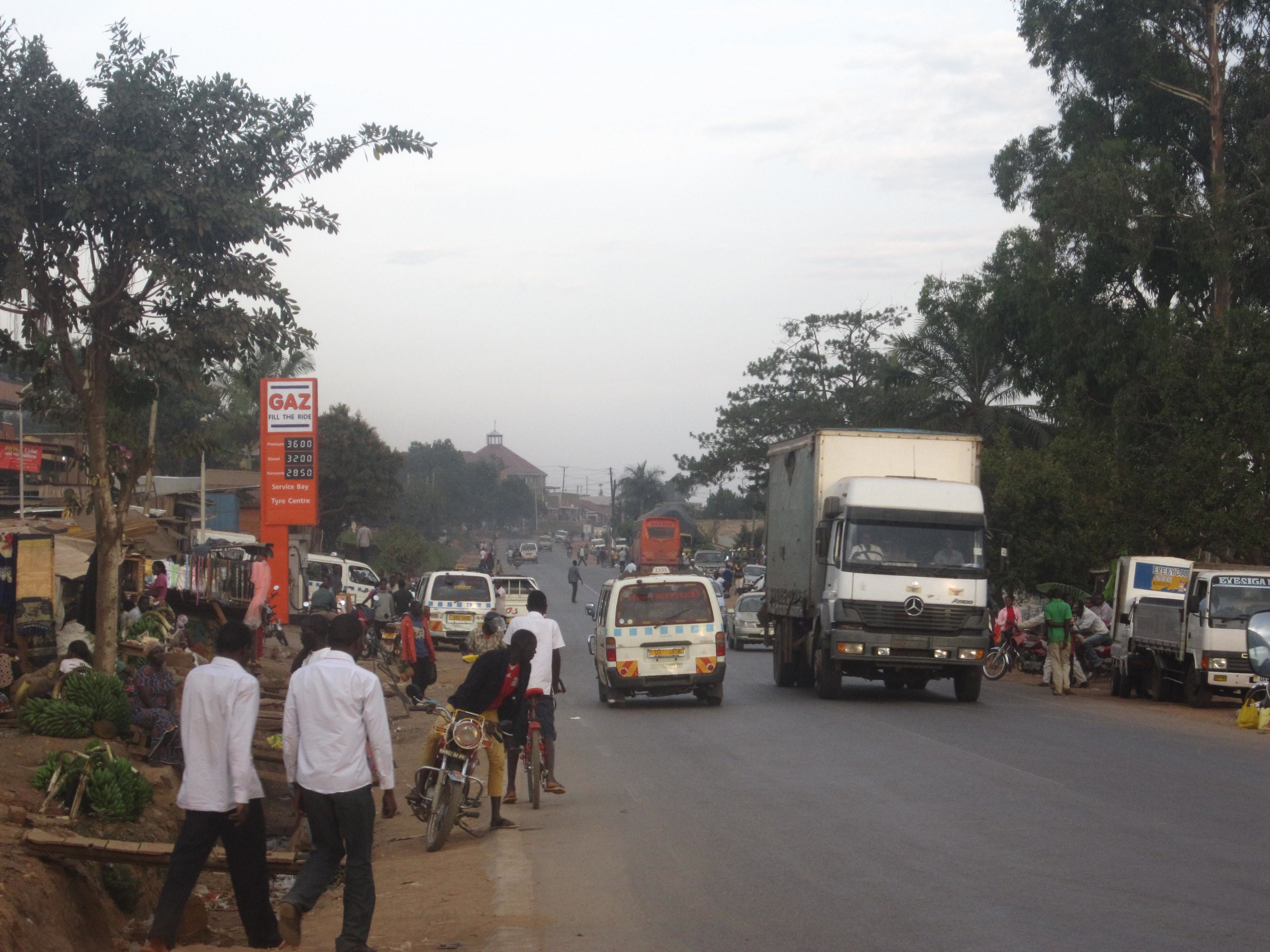
Bombo road in Matugga - Mabanda (Wakiso District)

Matugga is an urban centre in the Central Region of Uganda. The town is a rapidly developing residential neighborhood in Gombe division of Nansana municipality in Wakiso District.

== Location ==
The town located in Matugga sub-county, Kyaddondo County, in Wakiso District. The area is surrounded by Kabunza, Kilyowa, Nasse, and Sanga sub–counties. It is situated on the tarmacked, all-weather Kampala–Gulu Highway. Matugga is located approximately 20 kilometres (12 mi), by road, north of Kampala, Uganda's capital and largest city. The geographical coordinates of the town are 0°27'37.0"N, 32°31'43.0"E (Latitude:0.460278; Longitude:32.528611).

== Overview ==
Matugga is the starting point of the Matugga-Kapeeka Road, a 42 kilometres (26 mi) tarmacked road connecting the towns of Matugga, Gombe, Semuto, and Kapeeka. The highway traverses Wakiso District and Nakaseke District. The road was upgraded from gravel to bitumen in 2010 at an estimated cost of US$20 million. Sixty-five percent of the funding was provided by the government of Uganda, while 35 percent was provided by the Nordic Development Fund.

The name Matugga was adopted from Fredrick Matugga who had a house on a hill in the town in the 1980s. When he died, the hill was named after him.

== Population ==
In 2010, the town's population was estimated at 15,000, of whom about 60 percent were children below 18 years.

== Points of interest ==
The following points of interest are within the town limits or close to the edges of town:

1. Offices of Matugga Town Council

2. Matugga Central Market

3. Busaawa-Mmanze Health Centre, a community health center administered by MACERUDET, a local NGO 4. Revival Life Center, a complex with a 450-pupil primary school, a 200-pupil secondary school, and a 150-pupil orphanage administered by Pastor Ivan Lugoloobi of Revival Ministries, a Pentecostal Church

5. Catholic Centre, a Catholic Church centre with St. Charles Lwanga Primary School administered by the Franciscan order of Greyfriars 6. Ladybird School, an 80-pupil elementary boarding school affiliated with the Ingleton Middle School in Ingleton, North Yorkshire, United Kingdom

7. Life in the Word Church, in Lwadda A cell, a pentecoatal Church, founded and led by Rev. Isaac Mugabi, a No Place Left Practitioner and movement trainer who has initiated several movements in Uganda.

== Prominent people ==
- Fabian Kasi, an accountant, bank executive, and businessman who is the managing director and chief executive officer of Centenary Bank.

== See also ==
- Gombe
- Buganda
- Kampala Archdiocese
- List of cities and towns in Uganda
