= Shilla Omuriwe Buyungo =

Ugandan volleyballer and coach

Personal information
- Full name: Shilla Omuriwe Buyungo
- Nationality: Ugandan
- Born: July 17, 1977 (age 49); Uganda
- Education: Makerere University; University of Bridgeport

Volleyball information
- Position: Libero
- Current club: Kampala Capital City Authority Volleyball Club

Career
Years	Teams
2007–2018; 2007–2009	Kampala Amateur Volleyball Club (KAVC); Bridgeport University

National team
2009–2014	Uganda

Shilla Omuriwe Buyungo (at times referred to as Shilla Allison Omuriwe Buyungo) (born 17 July 1977) is a Ugandan volleyball player and the current Head Coach of the Uganda Volleyball Cranes, Uganda's Men's National Volleyball team. Buyungo was appointed to this position in July 2021 making her the first female to hold this position. She was also the first woman to coach at the African Club Championship 2015 in Tunisia.

== Background and education ==
Buyungo attended Wanyange Girls School and later on, Makerere University where she earned a bachelor's degree in Social Sciences concentrating on Political Science and Social Administration. Buyungo then joined the University of Bridgeport to do a master's degree in Counseling and Guidance (concentrating on Human Resource Development) as well as a Masters in Business Administration (Management).

Buyungo also holds She holds an International Coaching Diploma which she obtained at the University of Leipzig in Germany.

== Career ==
As of 2013, Buyungo was playing for Uganda's Women's National Volleyball team as a libero. Buyungo played for the University of Bridgeport's Volleyball team (the Purple Knights) for two years. While earning an MBA at the same institution, she served as a Graduate Assistant Coach between 2007 and 2009. In between, she was also the Girls' Coach at the Connecticut Sports Centre (2008-2009). Still in the United States, Buyungo played for teams like West Port, Wilton and Fair field volleyball.

Omuriwe has held a number of overlapping positions : between 2014 and 2018, she was the men's head coach at KAVC and for some time, the club's Technical Director. During this time she led the team to winning the Uganda Volleyball Federation (UVF) National Volleyball League in 2014.

In 2015, while coaching KAVC, Omuriwe became the first female coach to lead a men's team at the CAVB tournament.

In between, she was a youth coach for girls at Kampala International School, Uganda (KISU) (2016 -2017). She later coached at the International School of Uganda (ISU) between 2018 and 2019 while also coaching at Kyambogo University (2017 - 2018).

She left KAVC in 2018 to join Airforce Volleyball as its head coach while also serving as the assistant coach for the Women's National Volleyball Team (She Volley Cranes) between 2018 and 2019. In 2021, Omuriwe was named head coach for the Uganda Volleyball Cranes. Shilla was recently appointed as an FIVB Volleyball Instructor; the first Ugandan to hold such a position.

== Personal life ==
Buyungo is married to Peter Buyungo, a retired volleyball player with KAVC and they have three children
