= Sarah Najjuma =

Ugandan politician

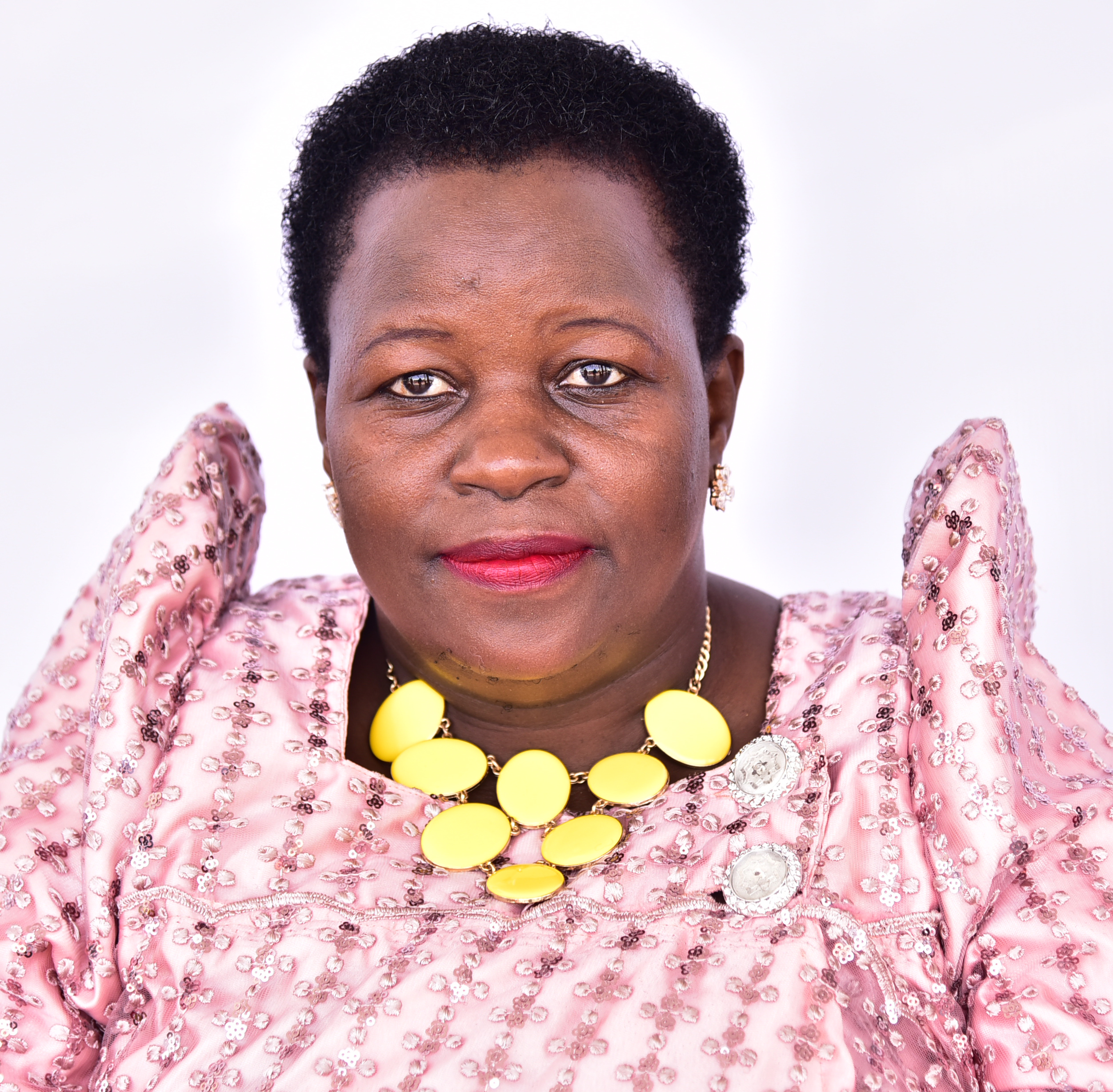
- Born: Luwero District
- Citizenship: Ugandan
- Education: Primary Leaving Examination Nalinya Lwantale Primary School, Uganda Certificate of Education Nabisunsa Girls School, Uganda Advanced Certificate of Education [Nabisunsa Girls School], Bachelor of Arts in Education Makerere University, Master of Arts in Development Studies [Nkumba University], Postgraduate Diploma in Public Administration and Management Nkumba University.
- Alma mater: Nalinya Lwantale Primary School; Nabisunsa Girls School; Makerere University; Nkumba University
- Occupations: Teacher, Ugandan Politician.
- Known for: Representing Nakaseke Constituency in Parliament; Former Senior Community Development Officer, Nakaseke District; Community development work in Luweero and Nakaseke districts
- Office: Member of Parliament for Nakaseke Constituency
- Political party: National Resistance Movement (NRM)

Sarah Najjuma, is a female Ugandan politician and a teacher by profession. She is a member of parliament for the Nakaseke Constituency in the Parliament of Uganda representing the ruling National Resistance Movement (NRM) party. She was elected to this position in February 2016. She replaced Rose Namayanja, the former woman representing Nakaseke District who served from May 2006 to February 2016.

== Early life and education ==
In 1995, Sarah Najjuma accomplished her Primary Leaving Examination from Nalinya Lwantale Primary School. In 1996, she obtained her Uganda Certificate of Education in Nabisunsa Girls School. In 1998, she attained her Uganda Advanced Certificate of Education at Nabisunsa Girls' School. She holds a Bachelor of Arts in education from Makerere University and a Master of Arts in Development Studies from Nkumba University. In 2011, she obtained a Postgraduate Diploma in Public Administration and Management from Nkumba University.

== Career ==
Between 2004 and 2005, Sarah Najjuma worked as a community development officer at the Luweero District Local Government.

From 2005 to 2007, she was the community development officer for Nakaseke District Local Government.

From 2007 to 2015, she was the Senior Community Development Officer, Nakaseke District Local Government.

=== Political career ===
From 2016 to date, she has been a member of parliament. She contested for the Nakaseke District Woman Member of Parliament seat in the 2026 general elections as the National resistance Movement flag bearer and won with 55,455 votes defeating National Unity Platform's flagbearer Ms. Esther Nakawooya who gathered 26,873 according to the results declared by the Nakaseke District Returning Officer then Ms. Aidah Tusiime.

== Personal life ==
Najjuma is a married person and comes from an Islamic background. She is interested in netball and loves playing it during her free time.
