= Semuto =

Town in Uganda

- Map of Uganda showing the location of Semuto
- Coordinates: 00°37′12″N 32°19′40″E
- Country: Uganda
- Region: Central Region of Uganda
- District: Nakaseke District
- Constituency: Nakaseke South

Government
  - Member of Parliament: Luttamaguzi Semakula Paulson Kasana
- Elevation: 1,180 m (3,870 ft)

Population (2014 census)
  - Total: 10,935 estimated at 21,000 in 2,023
- Time zone: UTC+3 (EAT)

Semuto is a town in the Central Region of Uganda. It is one of the urban centers in Nakaseke District.

Semuto town will merge with Kapeeka to form the Semuto municipality.

== Location ==
Semuto is approximately 36 kilometres (22 mi), by road, northwest of Matugga on the Matugga–Kapeeka Road. This is approximately 55 kilometres (34 mi), by road, northwest of Kampala, Uganda's capital and largest city. The coordinates of the town are 0°37'12.0"N, 32°19'40.0"E (Latitude:0.620000; Longitude:32.327778).

== Overview ==
Semuto is located along the Matugga–Kapeeka Road. The road is 42 kilometres (26 mi) long, linking Matugga in Wakiso District to Kapeeka in Nakaseke District. The road goes through Gombe in Wakiso District and Semuto. The road was upgraded from gravel to bitumen at an estimated cost of US$20 million. 65 percent of the funding was provided by the government of Uganda, while 35 percent was provided by the Nordic Development Fund. The work was carried out by China Chongqing International Construction Corporation. COWI A/S, a Danish consultancy firm, supervised the work. Construction was completed in late 2011.

== Population ==
In August 2014, the national census and household survey enumerated the population of Semuto Town Council at 10,935 people. Today the population of Semuto is estimated at 21,027 people.

== Points of interest ==
The following additional points of interest are found within the town limits or close to the edges of town: (a) the offices of Semuto Town Council (b) the Matugga–Kapeeka Road, going through the middle of town in a south to north direction. (c) Semuto central market (d) Semuto Health Center IV, a health facility administered by Nakaseke District local government. (e) Semuto Church of Uganda is a place of worship belonging to the Church of Uganda. (f) Hudani Manji Limited, a chicken processing factory. (g) The war memorial center with a mass grave of the 1980-1986 NRA/NRM war in the area claiming over 500,000 lives.

== See also ==
- Luwero Triangle
