= Nyombi =

Nyombi is a surname. Notable people with the surname include:

- Peter Nyombi (1954–2018), Ugandan lawyer and politician
- Thembo Nyombi (born 1964), Ugandan economist and politician
