= Wakyaato =

- Map of Uganda showing the location of Wakyaato
- Coordinates: 00°52′41″N 32°12′18″E
- Country: Uganda
- Region: Central Uganda
- District: Nakaseke District
- Constituency: Nakaseke North

Government
  - Member of Parliament: Syda Bbumba
- Elevation: 1,080 m (3,540 ft)
- Time zone: UTC+3 (EAT)

Wakyaato is a town in Nakaseke District, Central Uganda. The correct spelling of the town is with two "a"s after the "y". However, some sources have the wrong spelling with one "a".

== Location ==
The town of Wakyaato is located approximately 37.5 kilometres (23.3 mi), by road, west of Luweero, the largest town in the sub-region. This location is approximately 92 kilometres (57 mi), by road, northwest of Kampala, Uganda's capital and largest city. The coordinates of Wakyaato are:00 52 41N, 32 12 18E (Latitude:0.8790;Longitude:32.2000).

== Overview ==
Wakyaato is a small town in northern Nakaseke District. It is the headquarters of Wakyaato Sub-county, one of the eight (8) Sub-counties that constitute the district. The northern part of the district is inhabited predominantly by pastoralist communities, contrasting with the subsistence agriculturalists who inhabit the southern part of Nakaseke District.

== Population ==
The exact population of Wakyaato is not known, as of January 2010.

== Landmarks ==
The landmarks within the town or close to its borders include:

- The offices of Wakyaato Town Council
- The headquarters of Wakyaato Sub-county
- Wakyaato Central Market is the main market
- Wakyaato Health Center III - A health facility administered by the Uganda Ministry of Health
- Wakyaato Prison - A correctional facility administered by the Uganda Prisons Department

== See also ==
- Nakaseke District
- Luweero Triangle
- Central Region, Uganda
