= Kapeeka =

Town in Uganda

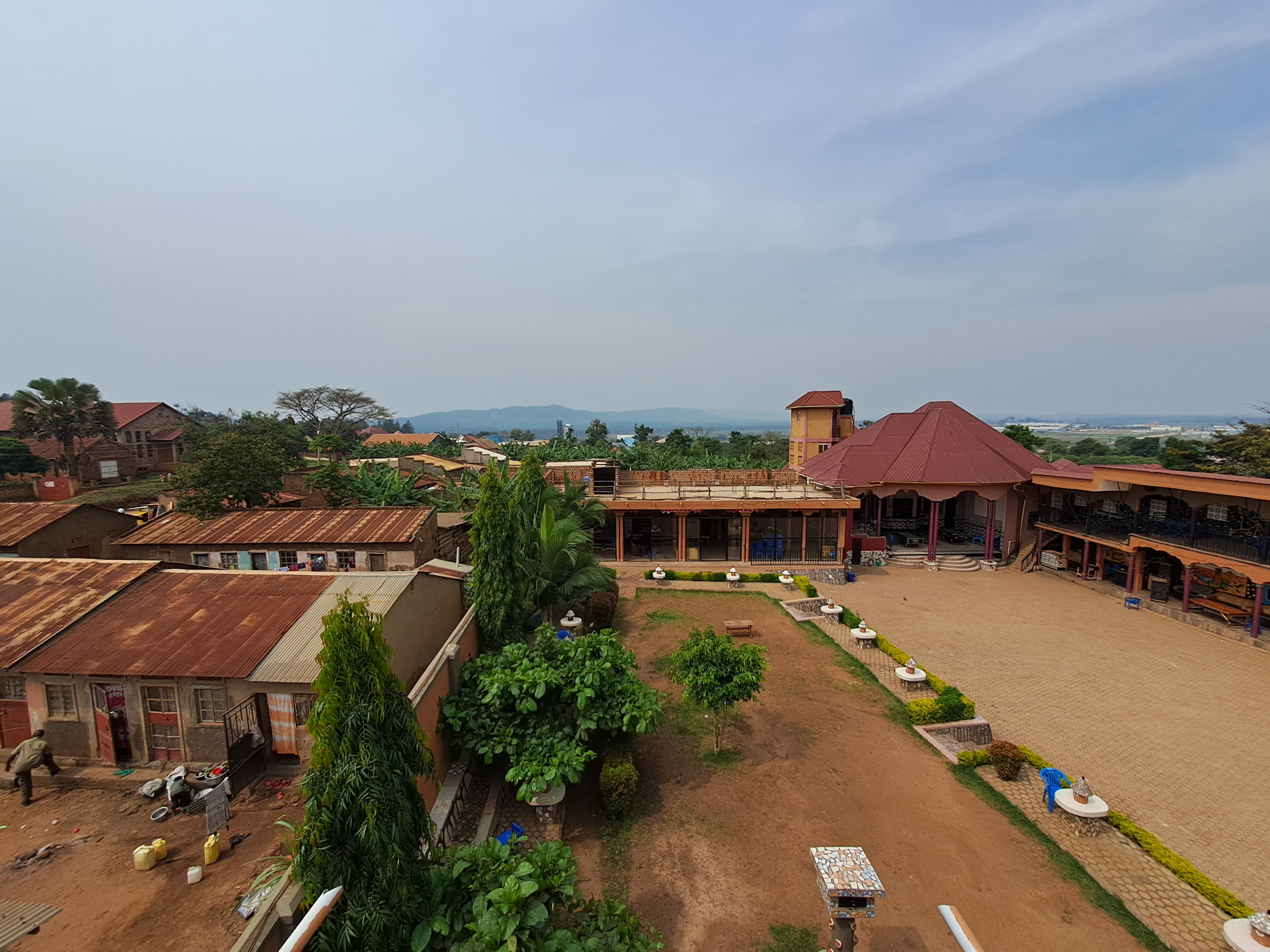
- Kapeeka

- Map of Uganda showing the location of Kapeeka
- Coordinates: 00°40′54″N 32°14′48″E
- Country: Uganda
- Region: Central Region of Uganda
- District: Nakaseke District
- Constituency: Nakaseke South

Government
  - Member of Parliament: Edward W. Sempala Mbuga
- Elevation: 1,160 m (3,810 ft)
- Time zone: UTC+3 (EAT)

Kapeeka is a town in Nakaseke District of the Central Region of Uganda.

Kapeeka will merge with Semuto to form the Semuto municipality as requested by residents and given a go ahead by the president.

Kapeeka is the home to the promising Namukekera industrial centre.

== Location ==
Kapeeka is approximately 43 kilometres (27 mi), by road, northwest of Matugga. This is approximately 62 kilometres (39 mi), by road, northwest of Kampala, Uganda's capital city. The coordinates of the town are 0°40'54.0"N, 32°14'48.0"E (Latitude:0.681667; Longitude:32.246667).

== Overview ==
Kapeeka is the northernmost location on the 42 kilometres (26 mi) Matugga–Kapeeka Road, linking Matugga and Gombe in Wakiso District to Semuto and Kapeeka in Nakaseke District. It was upgraded from gravel to bitumen between 2008 and 2011. Chongqing International Construction Corporation (CICO) of China performed the work at a cost of about US$20 million (USh:37.9 billion). Sixty-five percent of the funding was provided by the government of Uganda, and the Nordic Development Fund lent the remaining 35 percent. COWI A/S, a Danish consultancy firm, supervised the work.

== Points of interest ==
The following additional points of interest are found within the town limits or close to its borders: (a) Kapeeka central market (b) offices of Kapeeka Town Council (c) offices of Kapeeka sub-county and (e) Namunkekera Rural Industrial Center (NRIC), is located at Namunkekera, Nakaseke District, west of Kapeeka.

== See also ==
- List of cities and towns in Uganda
- List of roads in Uganda
