= Nakaseke General Hospital =

- Uganda Ministry of Health

Geography
- Location: Nakaseke, Nakaseke District, Central Region, Uganda
- Coordinates: 00°43′06″N 32°23′56″E

Organisation
- Care system: Public
- Type: General

Services
- Emergency department: I
- Beds: 120

History
- Founded: 1969

Links
- Other links: Hospitals in Uganda

Nakaseke General Hospital, also Nakaseke Hospital, is a public hospital in the Central Region of Uganda.

== Location ==
The hospital is located in the town of Nakaseke, in Nakaseke District, in the part of the country known as the Luweero Triangle. Its location is approximately 65 kilometres (40 mi), by road, northwest of Mulago National Referral Hospital. This is approximately 35 kilometres (22 mi), by road, northwest of Bombo Military Hospital, the nearest bigger hospital. The coordinates of Nakaseke General Hospital are:0°43'06.0"N, 32°23'56.0"E (Latitude:0.718344; Longitude:32.398893).

== Overview ==
Nakaseke hospital is a rural hospital built in the 1960s by the administration of Prime Minister Milton Obote. It serves Nakaseke District together with some parts of the neighboring districts of Luweero, Wakiso, Nakasongola and Mityana.

During the National Resistance Movement War in the early 1980s, the hospital served as a major health facility for the NRA guerrillas. Dr. Ronald Bata (R.I.P), the then Medical Director of the hospital, was recruited into the guerrilla force and became their chief medical officer.

== Renovation ==
In 2013, the government of Uganda borrowed money from the World Bank to construct and renovate certain hospitals, including Nakaseke General Hospital. The construction contract was awarded to Yanjian Uganda Company Limited, at a contract price of US$5,090,612.33. By November 2015, those renovations were complete. The scope of work involved the following:

1. Build new outpatients department 2. Build new emergency room (casualty department) 3. Build a new building to house diesel generator for electricity 4. Build a placenta disposal pit 5. Build another pit for disposal of bio-medical waste 6. Build six new staff houses 7. Renovate six existing staff residences 8. Build a laundry facility for patients' families 9. Build a kitchen and dining room for patients' families 10. Build ventilated improved pit latrines for patient families and outpatients and 11. Build two new physician residencies.

== See also ==
- List of hospitals in Uganda
