= Luweero–Butalangu Road =

Road in Uganda

Coordinates: 0°51′19″N 32°20′27″E

Route information
- Length: 18 mi (29 km)
- History: Designated in 2023; Expected completion in 2026

Major junctions
- East end: Luweero
- Kiwoko
- West end: Butalangu

Location
- Country: Uganda

Highway system
- Roads in Uganda

The Luweero–Butalangu Road is a road in the Central Region of Uganda, connecting the town of Luweero, the political headquarters of Luweero District, with the town of Butalangu, the political and administrative headquarters of Nakaseke District.

== Location ==
The road starts at Luweero (pop. 42,734), and continues through Kiwoko (pop. 11,013), to end at Butalangu (pop. 3,873), a total distance of approximately 29 kilometres (18 mi).

== Upgrading to bitumen ==
In December 2016, the Uganda National Roads Authority (UNRA) announced its intention to upgrade the gravel surfaced road to class II bitumen surface. The improvements are budgeted at US$40 million co-financed by the Arab Bank for Economic Development in Africa (BADEA) and the OPEC Fund for International Development (OFID), and are expected to last two years. UNRA sought parliamentary approval to borrow the required funds and received approval in December 2016.

In February 2017, BADEA and the government of Uganda signed loan agreements at BADEA's headquarters in Khartoum, for the funding portion of the road upgrade that BADEA has agreed to finance. Sidi Ould TAH, the Director General of BADEA signed on behalf of BADEA and Matia Kasaija, Minister of Finance, Planning and Economic Development signed for Uganda.

In UNRA's end-of-year report for 2016/2017, which ended on 30 June 2017, this road is listed among those road projects at the "Feasibility study for road upgrading" stage.

== Developments ==
The engineering, procurement and construction (EPC) contract was awarded to Dott Services Limited. Construction was launched on 9 June 2023, with commissioning expected after 36 months. The contract price is reported as USh93 billion (approx. US$25.2 million). As of September 2024, 10 percent of the work had been concluded. In May 2026, the Daily Monitor reported that 77.1 percent of the construction work had been completted.

== See also ==
- Economy of Uganda
- Transport in Uganda
- List of roads in Uganda
- Uganda National Roads Authority
