= Pikine Drainage Network =

Stormwater management system in Senegal

The Pikine Drainage Network is a large-scale stormwater management and sanitation system serving the densely populated suburban areas of Pikine, Keur Massar, and Guédiawaye, located on the outskirts of Dakar. This network is the primary physical output of the Projet de Gestion des Eaux Pluviales et d'Adaptation au Changement Climatique (PROGEP 2), which is co-financed by the World Bank, the African Development Bank, and the Nordic Development Fund. By 2026, the project had reportedly constructed 46,000 linear meters of drainage canals within the "Pikine-Keur Massar-Guédiawaye triangle".

== History and Design ==
The initial phase of the project began around 2012, focusing on reducing flooding in the low-lying suburbs of Dalifort, Wakhinane, and Nimzatt. The system relies primarily on a gravity-fed mechanism and a vast network of canals that directs stormwater towards natural outlets without the need for constant pumping, utilizing the region's topography to flow toward the sea. In addition to open canals, the network integrates 30 kilometers of self-locking paved roads designed to facilitate water infiltration into the water table, reducing surface runoff.

=== Operational Impact ===
Hydrological engineers have reported that the system effectively manages rainfall events exceeding 130 millimeters, allowing water to flow gravitationally without causing significant urban backflow. Despite the success, officials have noted that the work remains incomplete, requiring extension of collector pipes to surrounding zones such as the Technopôle and continuous maintenance to prevent sediment clogging. The World Bank has cited the PROGEP 2 (a climate resilience and flood management initiative in senegal) model as an "innovation benchmark" for West and Central Africa in urban flood management.
