= Jim Muhwezi =

Ugandan lawyer and retired politician and army general

Major General Jim Muhwezi
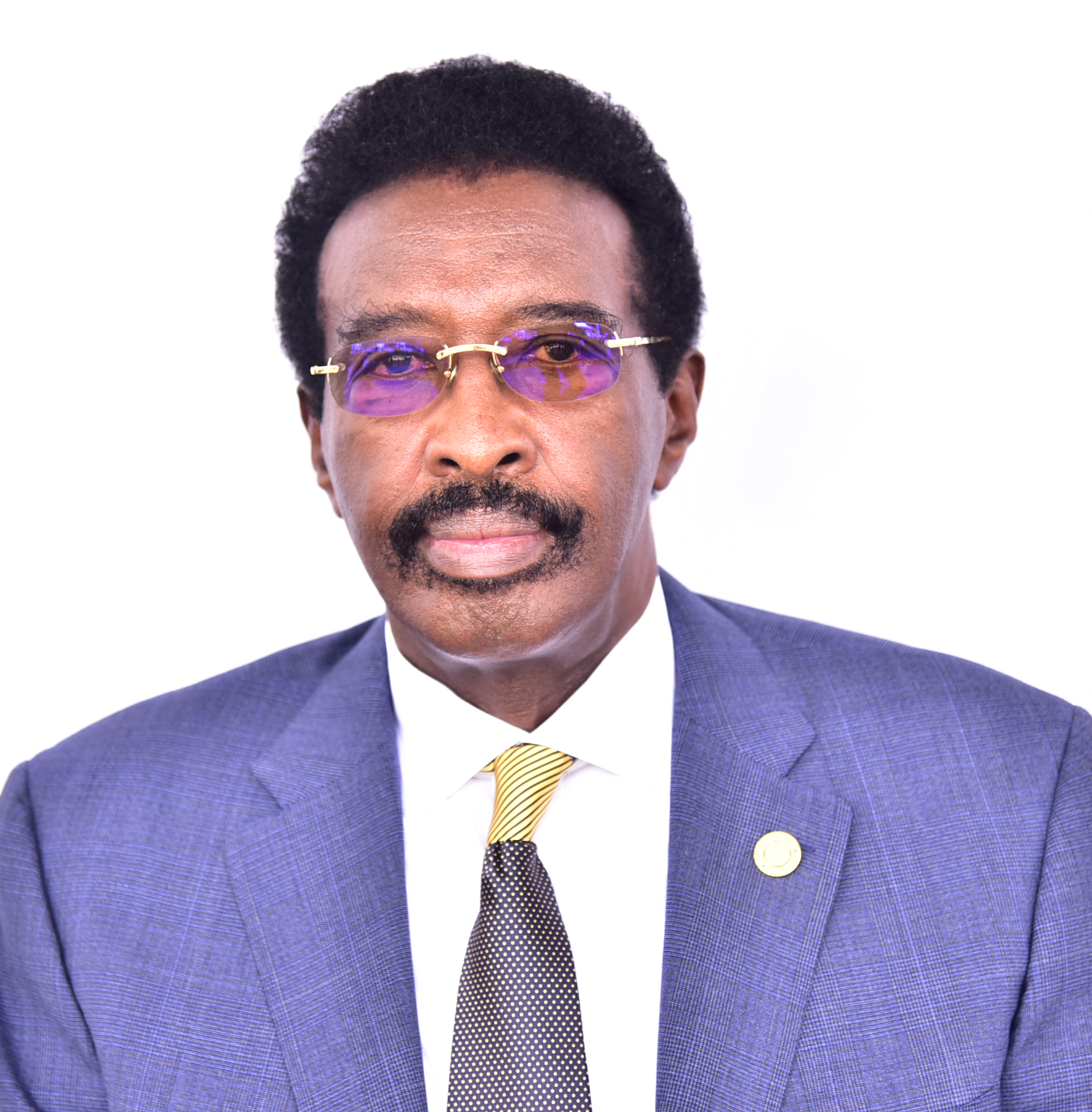
- Born: 23 August 1950 (age 76); Uganda
- Citizenship: Uganda
- Education: Makerere University (Bachelor of Laws); Law Development Centre (Diploma in Legal Practice); Military Institution In USSR (Senior Command Course); Tanzania Police Academy (Police Cadet Course)
- Occupations: Lawyer, Politician & Retired Military Officer
- Years active: 1980 — present
- Known for: Politics, Corruption & Embezzlement of Ugandan public resources with Impunity
- Title: Uganda's Minister of Information & National Guidance
- Spouse: Susan Muhwezi

Major General (retired) Jim Muhwezi Katugugu (born 23 August 1950) is a Ugandan lawyer, politician and former military officer. He has served as the Cabinet Minister for National Security in the Ugandan Cabinet since 8 June 2021.

From March 2015 until May 2016, he served as the Minister of Information and National Guidance in the Cabinet of Uganda. He had been appointed to that position in a cabinet reshuffle on 1 March 2015, replacing Rose Namayanja, who was dropped from the cabinet.

Also, he is the Member of Parliament (MP) representing Rujumbura County, Rukungiri District. He regained that seat in 2021, having lost it for five years between 2016 and 2021. He was re-elected to represent Rujumbura County during the January 2026 general elections. In May 2026, he was appointed Minister in the Office of the President for Security.

== Early life and education ==
Jim Muhwezi was born in Rukungiri District on 23 August 1950. He holds the degree of Bachelor of Laws (LLB), from Makerere University, Uganda's oldest and largest public university. He also has received Senior Military Police and Security Intelligence Training from Tanzania and the former Soviet Union. In July 2009, the Law Development Center in Kampala awarded him the Diploma in Legal Practice, the prerequisite to enrolling as an advocate in Uganda and for obtaining a license to practice law in the country.

== Career ==
In the 1970s, Jim Muhwezi worked as a policeman in the Uganda Police Force. He was one of the combatants in the war (1981–1986) that ushered the National Resistance Movement into power. After the war, he served as a member of the National Resistance Council (NRC) from 1986 until 1996. During the same period, he concurrently served as the first Director General of the Internal Security Organisation (ISO). As head of ISO, Muhwezi is credited with cleaning up the reputation and image of the security police apparatus. During his ten-year tenure at the agency, no allegations of torture were raised against the agency. Between 1994 and 1995, he served as a member of the Constituent Assembly that drew up the 1995 Ugandan Constitution. From 1996 until 1998, Jim Muhwezi served as Minister of State in Charge of Primary Education. He was appointed Minister of Health in 2001, serving in that capacity until 2006.

== Corruption scandals, controversies and legal proceedings ==
Muhwezi has been the subject of several corruption-related allegations and legal controversies during his political career. According to a 2014 report by ActionAid Uganda, in August 1985, while serving as a senior National Resistance Army commander, Muhwezi led NRA guerrillas in a raid on the Bank of Uganda Currency Centre in Kabale and took over Shs400 million, which the newsletter claimed was never refunded after the NRA came to power.

In 1998, Muhwezi was censured by Uganda’s Sixth Parliament while serving as Minister of State for Primary Education over allegations connected to the management of the Universal Primary Education programme.

In 2005, the Global Fund temporarily suspended grants to Uganda, citing serious mismanagement of funds. A judicial commission of inquiry later examined the handling of the funds and reported alleged interference by Muhwezi in the administration of the grants. Muhwezi and his then deputies, Mike Mukula and Alex Kamugisha, were left out of President Yoweri Museveni’s new Cabinet in 2006, a move observers linked to the Global Fund scandal.

In April 2006, IRIN reported that the Global Fund inquiry had heard allegations of inflated expenses, false receipts and misallocation of money. The head of the commission, Justice James Ogoola, strongly criticised the management of the funds. Muhwezi denied wrongdoing and rejected calls to resign.

According to Reuters, in May 2007, The Ugandan court charged Muhwezi with abuse of office and embezzlement in relation to funds donated for children’s vaccines under the Global Alliance for Vaccines and Immunisation. The report stated that a government watchdog had accused him of abuse of office, causing financial loss and theft. Muhwezi was unavailable for comment, but Reuters reported that he had accused President Museveni of manipulating investigations as part of a smear campaign.

The Uganda Inspector General of Government also accused Muhwezi and two former junior health ministers of gross misappropriation of Shs7.9 billion from GAVI funds, and recommended that Muhwezi refund Shs478 million within 60 days. Muhwezi applied to block his arrest and prosecution, but the High Court dismissed the application.

Voice of America reported that Muhwezi and two former deputies were charged over alleged misappropriation of donor funds, with offences including causing financial loss, embezzlement and forgery of documents.

In 2010, the Constitutional Court cleared the IGG to prosecute Muhwezi and his co-accused over the alleged misappropriation of Shs1.8 billion from GAVI funds. The court found that the IGG had powers to prosecute suspects accused of corruption, abuse of office, forgery and uttering false documents, although it also held that the appointment of Justice Faith Mwondha as IGG had been unconstitutional because she had not resigned as a judge.

In June 2010, New Vision reported that Muhwezi and his co-accused had appealed to the Supreme Court, challenging the Constitutional Court ruling that allowed the IGG to resume prosecuting them.

In 2012, Uganda Radio Network reported that the IGG had lined up 25 witnesses in the GAVI case against Muhwezi, Mukula, Kamugisha and former State House aide Alice Kaboyo. The accused faced charges of theft, causing financial loss, uttering false documents, embezzlement and abuse of office, allegedly committed between March 2004 and November 2005 while they served in the Ministry of Health.

ActionAid Uganda later summarized the Global Fund matter by stating that money meant for malaria, tuberculosis and AIDS treatment disappeared from the Ministry of Health, and that Muhwezi, Kamugisha and Mukula were put on trial over the alleged embezzlement.

In 2021, Muhwezi was named in reporting on the Pandora Papers. Daily Monitor reported that leaked documents identified him as one of three shareholders of Audley Holdings Ltd, a British Virgin Islands company. The report noted that setting up an offshore company is not illegal and that Muhwezi was not accused of wrongdoing in relation to the offshore structures.

The same reporting stated that Audley Holdings Ltd was closed in 2016 for failure to pay registration fees, and that in 2018 the Panamanian law firm Alcogal reported the company and its shareholders to British Virgin Islands regulators in a suspicious activity report after discovering earlier embezzlement allegations connected to the GAVI case.

The Pandora Papers reporting also linked Muhwezi to Sukari Loma Investment Holdings Ltd, a Cyprus company registered through SFM Corporate Services. According to the reports, documents described the company as providing financial services, and Muhwezi stated in a beneficial owner declaration that the funds came from salary savings, his hotel and radio stations. The Cyprus company was reportedly dissolved in 2015.

Muhwezi denied involvement in the overseas business and declined to discuss the allegations in detail. According to Daily Monitor, he said he did not know what was being referred to and asked whether the documents had been verified.

A 2021 case analysis by AML Network also discussed Muhwezi’s alleged offshore links, political power and hidden wealth in relation to the Pandora Papers disclosures.

The Independent also listed Muhwezi among politicians it described as associated with corruption allegations, citing his parliamentary censure, the Global Fund controversy, GAVI allegations, and a claim involving Rugasira/Tusubira & Co. Advocates and the National Medical Stores.

=== Digital number plate contract controversy ===
In October 2026, Ugandan Minister for Security Jim Muhwezi came under renewed scrutiny following a declaration by Attorney General Sam Mayanja that the government's controversial digital number plate agreement with Russian company Joint Stock Company Global Security (JSCGS) was legally null and unenforceable. The Attorney General told Parliament that the agreement contradicted existing Ugandan laws and failed to satisfy fundamental contractual requirements.

==== Signing and defence of the agreement ====
On 23 July 2021, Muhwezi signed an agreement between the Government of Uganda and JSCGS for the implementation of the Intelligent Transport Monitoring System (ITMS), which included digital vehicle registration plates and electronic vehicle-tracking technology. The agreement subsequently attracted criticism over procurement procedures, the contractor's background, project costs and the implications of vehicle surveillance.

Muhwezi defended the agreement, maintaining that the procurement had been conducted within the law and cleared by the Solicitor General. He stated that the project's primary purpose was to strengthen national security and assist law enforcement agencies in identifying vehicles involved in criminal activities. He also maintained that motorists would bear the registration costs.

In August 2023, when Parliament questioned the cost of digital number plates, Muhwezi defended the project's financing arrangement, arguing that the private contractor was investing its own funds and needed to recover its expenditure through charges associated with the system. The fee of approximately UGX 714,300 for new digital number plates subsequently became a subject of parliamentary scrutiny.

==== Attorney General's finding that the contract was null and void ====
On 6 October 2026, Attorney General Sam Mayanja informed Parliament's Committee on Physical Infrastructure that the July 2021 agreement was legally defective and did not bind the Government of Uganda. Mayanja stated that the contract contradicted existing legislation and that essential conditions underpinning the agreement had not been fulfilled.

The Attorney General told legislators:

"There's no contract which binds the State of Uganda because none of the conditions which go to the root of the matter have been fulfilled."

The Attorney General also questioned provisions allowing the private contractor to receive revenue associated with fines, which he considered inconsistent with Ugandan law. His legal assessment raised questions about the agreement's validity and the government's continued implementation of the project.

The parliamentary investigation identified concerns about the absence of a feasibility study, financial clearance and adequate value-for-money assessment. Legislators also examined the project's procurement, revenue-sharing arrangements, implementation and the financial burden imposed on motorists.

The findings renewed scrutiny of Muhwezi's involvement in the original agreement, particularly his earlier assurances that the procurement had been lawful and had received the necessary legal clearance.

==== Muhwezi's response and parliamentary scrutiny ====
Following the Attorney General's assessment, Muhwezi stated on 6 October 2026 that the digital number plate programme formed part of the broader ITMS initiative, which had been launched under the Ministry of Works and Transport. He maintained that the project was guided by President Yoweri Museveni and emphasised its national security objectives.

Muhwezi welcomed parliamentary oversight and stated that government programmes should be scrutinised to ensure value for money. His explanation attracted attention because he had previously signed and publicly defended the agreement whose legality was subsequently challenged by the Attorney General.

Muhwezi also defended the effectiveness of the vehicle-tracking system. During an appearance before Parliament's Committee on Physical Infrastructure on 30 September 2026, he stated that the system had assisted in recovering stolen vehicles. Police officials reported that 337 of 375 stolen motor vehicles recorded under the system had been recovered.

The controversy continued to attract parliamentary scrutiny over the agreement's approval, procurement and implementation. Although the Attorney General considered the contract legally unenforceable, the cited reports did not establish that Muhwezi had personally committed corruption or been convicted of any offence arising from the project.

== Personal life ==
Jim Muhwezi Katugugu is married to Susan Muhwezi, who is a sister to Ugandan tycoon Bob Kabonero and Ambassador Richard Kabonero. He has eleven children. He is reported to enjoy reading and playing golf. He is a member of the Anglican Church of Uganda.

== Parliamentary duties ==
He was a member of the parliamentary committee on physical infrastructure.

== See also ==
- Cabinet of Uganda
- Parliament of Uganda
- Uganda People's Defense Force
- Rukungiri District
