= Kiwoko =

- Map of Uganda showing the location of Kiwoko
- Coordinates: 00°50′39″N 32°21′47″E
- Country: Uganda
- Region: Central Region
- District: Nakaseke District
- Constituency: Nakaseke North

Government
  - Member of Parliament: Syda Bbumba

Population (2014 Census)
  - Total: 11,013
- Time zone: UTC+3 (EAT)

Kiwoko is a small town in the Central Region of Uganda. It is one of the municipalities in Nakaseke District.

== Location ==
Kiwoko is approximately 17 kilometres (11 mi), by road, west of Luweero, the largest town in the sub-region. Kiwoko is approximately 78 kilometres (48 mi), by road, northwest of Kampala, the capital and largest city of Uganda. The coordinates of the town are:0°50'39.0"N, 32°21'41.0"E (Latitude:0.844174; Longitude:32.361383).

== Population ==
During the national census and household survey of 27 and 28 August 2014, the Uganda Bureau of Statistics (UBOS), enumerated the population of Butalangu at 11,013 people.

== Points of interest ==
The following points of interest are found within the town limits or near its edges: (a) The offices of Kiwoko Town Council (b) Kiwoko Hospital - A 250-bed community hospital, administered by the Church of Uganda. (c) Kiwoko central market and (d) Luweero–Butalangu Road - This 29 kilometres (18 mi) road passes through the town of Kiwoko is a general east to west direction.

== Photos ==
- Photos of Kiwoko at Flickr.com

== See also ==
- Luweero triangle
