= Sewankambo =

Sewankambo is a surname. Notable people with the surname include:

- Irene Sewankambo, Ugandan electrical engineer
- Nelson Sewankambo, Ugandan physician
