= Alice Kaboyo =

Ugandan government minister

Hon. Alice Kaboyo

Minister of State for Luweero Triangle and Rwenzori Region
- Incumbent
- Assumed office 2021
- President: Yoweri Museveni
- Prime Minister: Robinah Nabbanja

Personal details
- Occupation: Politician

Alice Kaboyo is a Ugandan politician and government minister. She serves as Minister of State in the Office of the Prime Minister for Luweero Triangle and Rwenzori Region.

== Early career ==
Kaboyo previously worked as a State House aide. Uganda Radio Network reported her as head of the NRA Archives Unit and as a senior presidential advisor linked to NRA heritage work, including organisation of a veterans trek and plans for an NRA Museum at Kanyara, Nakaseke District.

== Minister of State ==
President Yoweri Museveni appointed Kaboyo to serve as Minister of State in the Office of the Prime Minister for Luweero Triangle-Rwenzori Region on 8 June 2021. The parliamentary Appointments Committee initially declined to approve her appointment in June 2021. On 6 July 2021, Uganda Radio Network reported the committee approved her appointment after reconsideration.

As minister, Kaboyo has overseen and participated in government programmes in her portfolio areas, including support to civilian veterans and public infrastructure initiatives.

== Parliament ==
Kaboyo appears on the Parliament of Uganda list of Members of the 11th Parliament as an ex officio member.

== See also ==
- Cabinet of Uganda
- Office of the Prime Minister (Uganda)
- Luweero Triangle
