= Richard Kabonero =

Ugandan civil servant and diplomat

Richard Tumusiime Kabonero
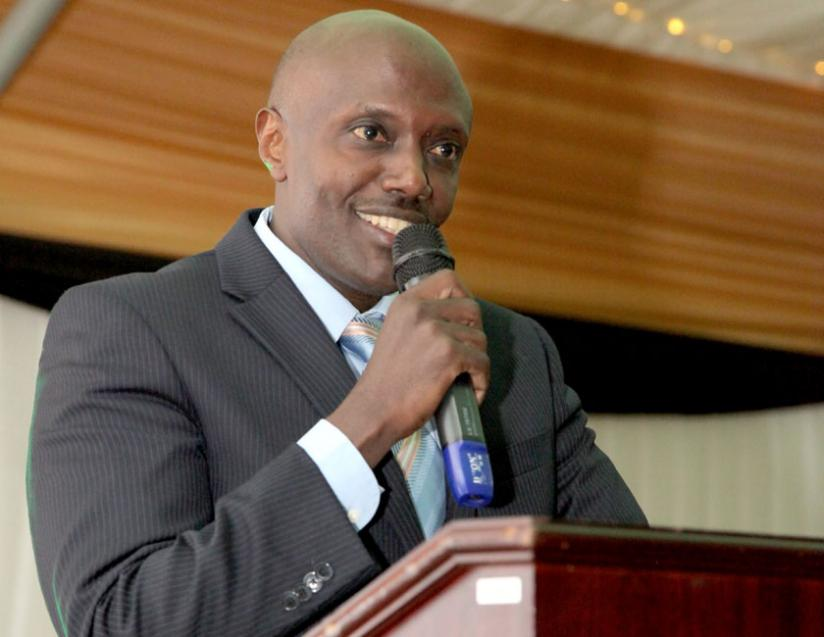
- Born: 1963 (age 62–63); Ntungamo, Uganda
- Citizenship: Uganda
- Occupations: Civil Servant and diplomat
- Years active: 1988 — present
- Known for: Diplomacy
- Title: His Excellency
- Family: Constance Kabonero (mother); Susan Muhwezi (sister); Bob Kabonero (brother); Jim Muhwezi (brother-in-law); Esteeri Kabonero (daughter)

Richard Tumusiime Kabonero, commonly known as Richard Kabonero, is a Ugandan civil servant and diplomat. He is the head of department of Regional Economic Cooperation, at the Uganda Ministry of Foreign Affairs, since June 2022. Before that, he served as Uganda's High Commissioner to Tanzania.

== Background and education ==
He was born in Ntungamo District, to Constance Kabonero († 2023), a midwife and later prominent businesswoman, and the late Kosia Kabonero, a veterinarian, circa 1963. His father died before Richard was born.

== Career ==
Kabonero started his career in 1988, working as a customs officer at Uganda Customs, the precursor to the Uganda Revenue Authority. Later, he was appointed as an Assistant Secretary, in the Ugandan Ministry of Foreign Affairs.

In 1990, he was appointed as 3rd Secretary at Uganda's High Commission to Kenya, based in Nairobi. Later he served in Uganda's Embassy to the United States based in Washington, DC and was promoted to First Secretary, responsible for Economic, Congressional and Press Affairs.

In 2006, he was appointed Uganda's High Commissioner to Rwanda, based in Kigali, serving in that capacity until 2017. While there, he is credited with the proper supervision of the construction of the Uganda Chancery, saving the government over USh400 million (approximately US$115,000) in annual rent expenses. During his tenure, bilateral trade between Rwanda and Uganda grew from US$50 million annually to US$200 every year. Also, in 2006, only 200 Rwandan students were enrolled in Ugandan schools, compared to over 1,500 in 2016. Richard Kabonero is personally credited with the improvement of relations between Uganda and Rwanda, which were frayed during the Second Congo War.

In January 2017, after 10 years in Kigali, he was transferred to Dar es Salaam, Tanzania, as the substantive High Commissioner. He presented his credentials to John Magufuli, the president of Tanzania on 1 August 2017. He also paid a courtesy visit to Ali Mohamed Shein, the president of Zanzibar on 19 October 2017.

As Uganda's high commissioner to Tanzania, he was concurrently accredited to Mozambique. He presented his credentials to Filipe Nyusi, the head of state of the country on 17 May 2018.

== See also ==
- Oliver Wonekha
- Ntungamo District
- List of diplomatic missions of Uganda
