= Irene Sewankambo =

Ugandan electrical engineer

- Born: Uganda
- Citizenship: Uganda
- Education: Makerere University (Bachelor of Science in Electrical Engineering); University of Bristol (Master of Science in Communications Systems and Signal Processing); University of Strathclyde (Master of Science in Economic Management and Policy)
- Occupations: Electrical engineer and corporate executive
- Years active: 2000 — present
- Known for: Professional competence
- Title: Director of Engineering and Communication Infrastructure of Uganda Communications Commission

Irene Kaggwa Sewankambo (née Irene Kaggwa) is a Ugandan electrical engineer and corporate executive, who serves as the Director of Engineering and Communication Infrastructure at the Uganda Communications Commission (UCC).

From 10 February 2020 until 24 November 2023, she served as the Acting Executive Director of the UCC.

== Background and education ==
She was born in Uganda and she attended Kitante Primary School in Kampala, Uganda. She studied at Mount Saint Mary's College Namagunga for her middle and high school education. She graduated with a High School Diploma in Mathematics, Physics and Chemistry. She was then admitted to Makerere University to study electrical engineering.

She holds a Bachelor of Science in Electrical Engineering degree, obtained from Makerere University, Uganda's oldest and largest public university. Her second degree, a Master of Science in Communications Systems and Signal Processing, was awarded by the University of Bristol. She also holds a Master of Science in Economic Management and Policy, obtained from the University of Strathclyde.

== Career ==
Before February 2020, Engineer Sewankambo served as the Director for Engineering and Communication Infrastructure at the Uganda Communications Commission. Before that, she was the head of the research and development unit at UCC as well as coordinator in the office of the executive director.

In February 2020, Judith Nabakooba, the Cabinet Minister of Information and Communications Technology appointed Irene Sewankambo as the Acting Executive Director, pending the appointment of a substantive executive director. She replaced Engineer Godfrey Mutabazi, whose two consecutive five-year contracts had expired.

In November 2023, after nearly four years as acting ED at UCC, she relinquished her ED role to George William Nyombi Thembo and reverted to her substantive role as Director of Engineering and Communication Infrastructure.

== Other consideration ==
She is credited with possession of soft people skills in the areas of leadership and management, including leading by example, mentoring, conflict resolution through dialogue, goal-setting and follow-up.

== Personal details ==
Irene Kaggwa Sewankambo is a married woman with children.

== See also ==
- Communications in Uganda
