= Sarah Kataike =

Ugandan politician

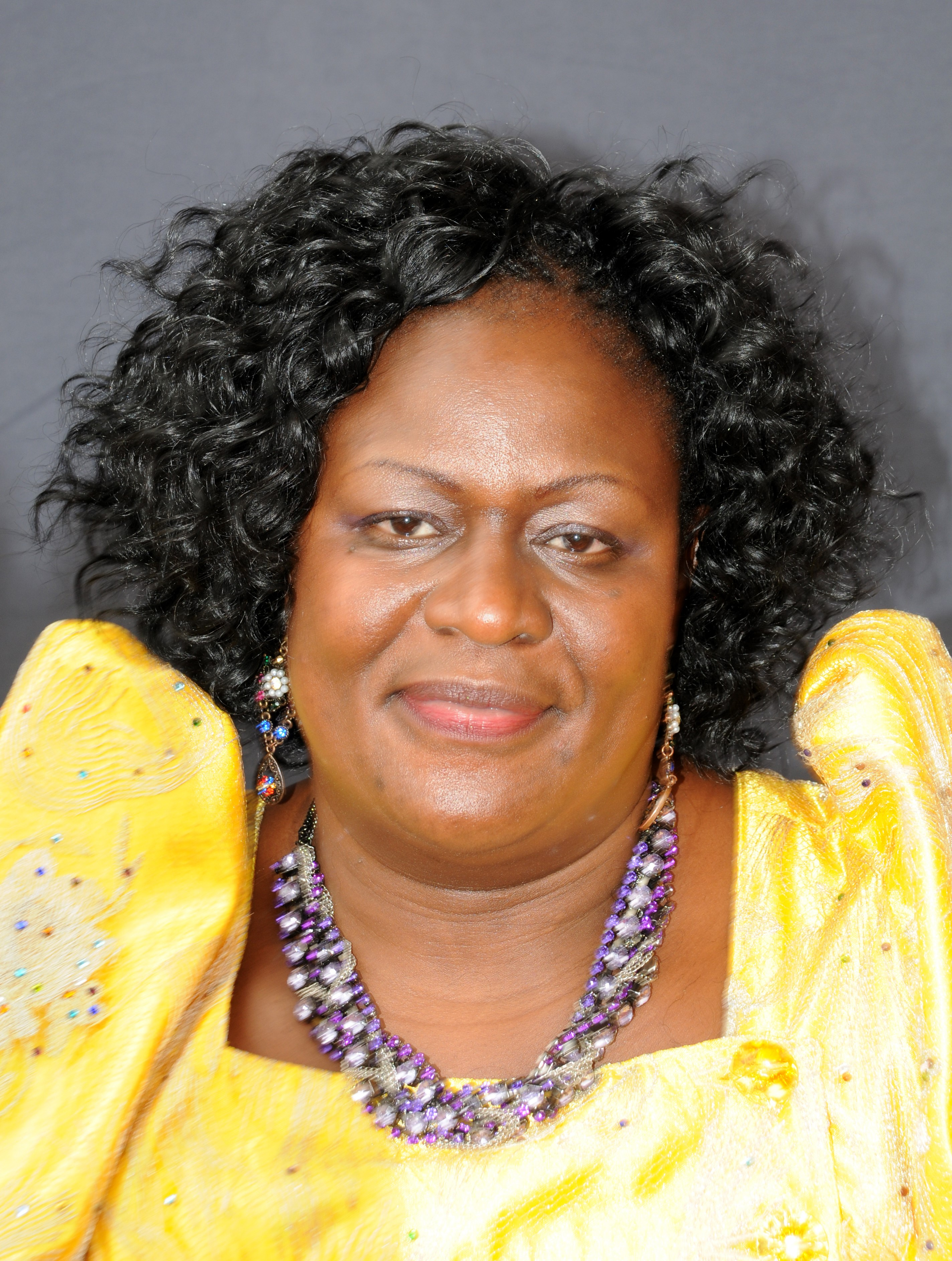
- Born: 21 January 1961 (age 65); Budaka District, Uganda
- Citizenship: Uganda
- Education: Bukalasa Agricultural College (Certificate in Agriculture) (Diploma in Agriculture); Unspecified Cameroonian Institution (Diploma in Integrated Rural Development); Makerere University (Bachelor of Science in Agriculture (Master of Science in Agricultural Extension and Education); Uganda Management Institute (Postgraduate Diploma in Organisational Development and Management)
- Occupations: Agriculturist, politician
- Years active: 1980 — present
- Known for: Politics
- Title: State Minister for Luweero Triangle

Sarah Ndoboli Kataike (born 21 January 1961) is a Ugandan politician. She is the current State Minister for Luweero Triangle, in the Cabinet of Uganda. She was appointed to that position on 25 July 2013. Prior to that, from 15 August 2012 until 25 July 2013, she served as the State Minister of Health for General Duties. She replaced Richard Nduhura, who was appointed Uganda's Ambassador to the United Nations. She was also the elected Member of Parliament for Budaka District Women's Constituency on the National Resistance Movement (NRM) political party ticket in the 9th parliament of Uganda.

== Early life and education ==
Kataike was born in Budaka District on 21 January 1961. She has extensive education in the area of agriculture. In 1980, at the age of 19, she graduated from Bukalasa Agricultural College with a Certificate in Agriculture. Following further training, Bukalasa awarded her the Diploma in Agriculture in 1985. In 1989, she graduated from an institution in Cameroon with a Diploma in Rural Integrated Development.

In 1996, she was admitted to Makerere University, Uganda's oldest public university, to study agriculture. She graduated in 1999 with the degree of Bachelor of Science in Agriculture. She continued her studies at Makerere and in 2003, was awarded the degree of Master of Science in Agricultural Extension and Education. Later, in 2010, she received the Postgraduate Diploma in Organisational Development and Management, from Uganda Management Institute.

== Career ==
=== Beginnings ===
In 1980, Kataike worked as a Farm Manager, serving upto 1985. Between 1990 and 1992, she served as the Project Coordinator of a local Vegetable Project in Budaka District. From 1992 until 1994, she served as the Technical Officer at a Mushroom Growing Project in Iganga District.

Between 1994 and 2000, she served as the District Agricultural Officer in Mukono District. From 2002 until 2004, she served as the Country Director for Uganda, The Hunger Project. From 2004 through 2006, she served as the Program Manager of two separate NGOs, working on poverty reduction and hunger alleviation in Africa. In 2007 and 2008, she served as the Chairperson of Budaka District Service Commission. From 2008 through 2010, she served as the World Bank Reintegration Specialist at the Uganda Amnesty Commission.

=== Political career ===
In 2011, Kataike entered politics as a contestant for the Budaka District Women's Constituency parliamentary seat. She ran on the ticket of the National Resistance Movement (NRM) political party and won. She was later elected to represent Uganda in the Pan African Parliament (PAP) based in South Africa. In PAP she was elected Chairperson of the Women's Caucus and hence became a member of the Cafe which is the governing body of the Pan African Parliament. She is the current incumbent. In a cabinet reshuffle on 15 August 2012, she was appointed State Minister for Health (General Duties) and henceforth had to resign from the Pan African Parliament as she had become an Executive to serve her country directly. In the cabinet reshuffle of 1 March 2015, she retained her present portfolio.

In 2016 general elections, Kataike contested as an independent candidate for Women Representative (MP) - Budaka and lost to against four other contestants and lost to Kamugo Pamela Nasiyo who is under National Resistance Movement.

== Personal life ==
Sarah Ndoboli Kataike is single. She is of the Anglican faith.

== Other responsibilities ==
She carries the following additional responsibilities in parliament: (a) Member of the Committee on Agriculture, Animal Industry and Fisheries (b) Member of the Committee on the National Budget (c) Member of the Committee on Rural Economy, Agriculture, Natural Resources and Environment and (d) Chairperson Women's Caucus.

== See also ==
- Districts of Uganda
- Parliament of Uganda
- Cabinet of Uganda
