= Nakaseke =

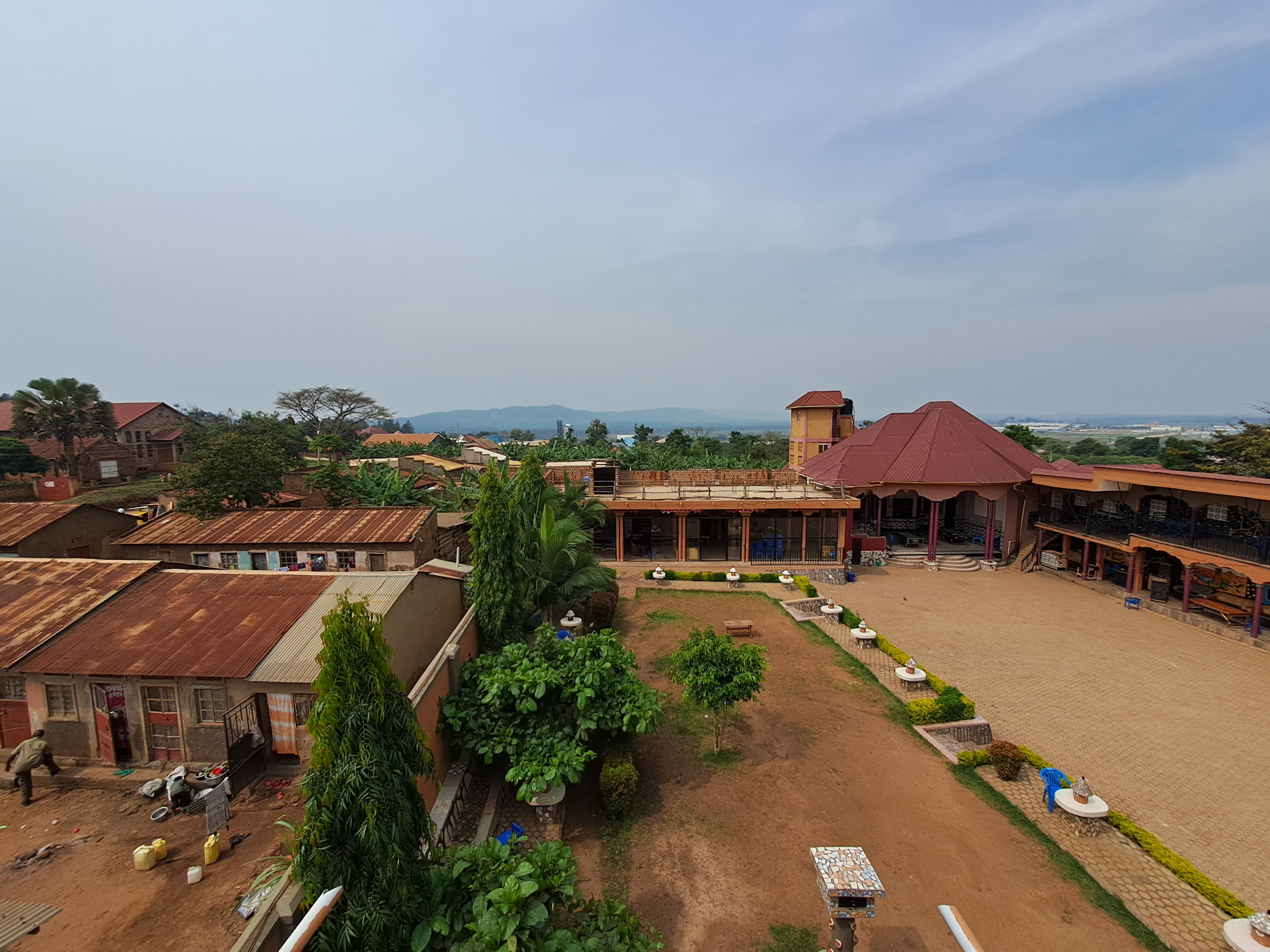

- Location in Uganda
- Coordinates: 00°43′48″N 32°24′54″E
- Country: Uganda
- Region: Central Region of Uganda
- District: Nakaseke District
- Elevation: 4,186 ft (1,276 m)

Population (2020 census)
  - Total: 8,600

Nakaseke is a town in Nakaseke District in the Central Region of Uganda. It is the main municipal and commercial center of the district. However, the political and administrative capital in the district is Butalangu.

== Location ==
Nakaseke is approximately 66 kilometres (41 mi) northwest of Kampala, Uganda's capital and largest city. The road from Kampala to Wobulenzi, a distance of about 47 kilometres (29 mi), is all-weather tarmac, with the last 19 kilometres (12 mi) to Nakaseke on a gravel-dirt road. The coordinates of the town are 0°43'48.0"N, 32°24'54.0"E (Latitude:0.7300; Longitude:32.4150). Nakaseke Town sits at an average elevation of 1,276 metres (4,186 ft) above mean sea level.

== Overview ==
Nakaseke Town Council was carved out of Nakaseke sub-county and was demarcated in 2010. The town, in its early years, faces challenges related to physical planning.

Most of the people in Nakaseke are Baganda, the largest ethnic group in the Central Region. An estimated 59.2 percent of the Nakaseke community is literate, which is largely limited to the Luganda language. A Primary Teachers' Training College has been built in Nakaseke. Nakaseke Hospital, a 120-bed public hospital owned by the Uganda Ministry of Health, is in Nakaseke town. The hospital is administered by the Nakaseke District Local Government The hospital is connected to other health units by a radio. The government of Uganda plans to build an industrial park in Nakaseke.

== Population ==
During the national census and household survey of 27 and 28 August 2014, the Uganda Bureau of Statistics (UBOS), enumerated the population of Nakaseke at 7,238 people.

In 2015, UBOS estimated the population of Nakaseke Town at 7,400. In 2020, the population agency estimated the mid-year population of the town at 8,600. UBOS calculated the rate of population growth of Nakaseke Town to average 3.05 percent annually, between 2015 and 2020.

== See also ==
- List of cities and towns in Uganda
- Luweero Triangle
