= Fabian Kasi =

Ugandan accountant and bank executive

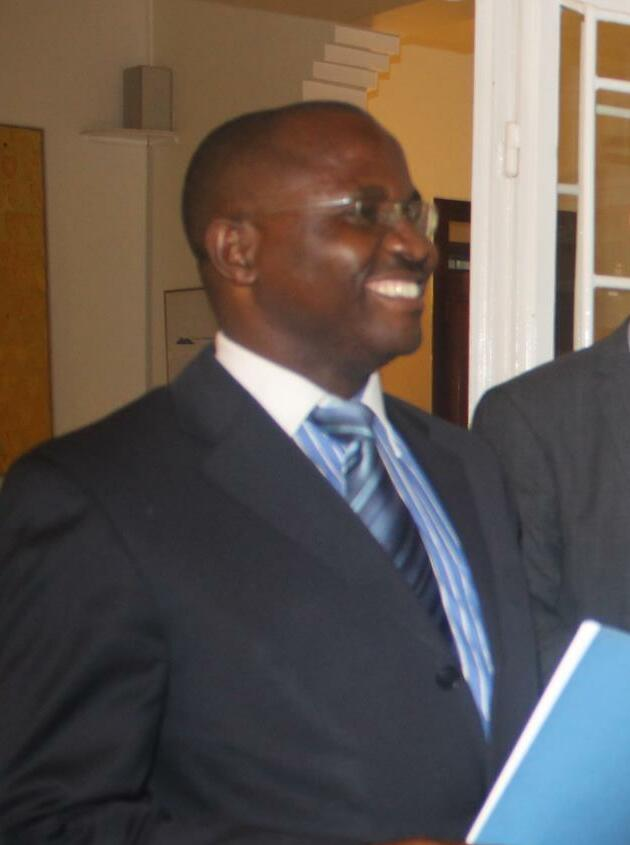
- Kasi in 2012
- Born: 1967 (age 58–59); Matugga, Uganda
- Education: Makerere University (Bachelor of Commerce); University of Newcastle (Australia) (Master of Business Administration); Association of Chartered Certified Accountants (Fellow of Chartered Certified Accountants)
- Occupations: Accountant, bank executive, businessman
- Years active: 1990 - present
- Title: Managing director & chief executive officer Centenary Bank

Fabian Kasi is an accountant, bank executive, and businessman in Uganda, the third-largest economy in the East African Community. He is the managing director and chief executive officer of the Centenary Bank, with over US$573 million in assets as of April 2014.

== Background and education ==
Kasi was born in 1967 in the town of Matugga in Wakiso District in the Central Region of Uganda. He attended St. Charles Lwanga Primary School, Matugga for his elementary schooling. He studied at St. Mary's College Kisubi for his O-level and A-level education. In 1988, he entered Makerere University, the oldest and largest public university in the country, graduating in 1991 with a Bachelor of Commerce degree in accounting. Later, he studied at the University of Newcastle (Australia), graduating with a Master of Business Administration degree. He is a fellow of the Association of Chartered Certified Accountants of the United Kingdom and a member of the Association of Certified Public Accountants of Uganda.

== Career ==
Since he was an undergraduate student at Makerere, he has worked at a number of organisations, including:

- British American Tobacco, Uganda Limited
- Shell Uganda Limited
- PriceWaterhouseCoopers
- Makerere University
- University of Newcastle (Australia)
- Bank of Uganda
- Commercial Bank of Rwanda

In 2002, he was appointed the executive director of FINCA Uganda Limited, a Microfinance Deposit-taking Institution (MDI) in the country, serving there until 2010. In August 2010, he was appointed as the managing director and chief executive officer of Centenary Bank, where he still served as of January 2015. He is a Paul Harris Fellow of the Rotary Club of Kiwaatule.

== Other considerations ==
Kasi is married with children. He is the vice chairman of the Uganda Bankers Association.

== See also ==
- List of banks in Uganda
- Banking in Uganda
- Economy of Uganda
- FINCA Uganda Limited
