= Chongqing International Construction Corporation =

Chinese construction and engineering company

China Chongqing International Construction Corporation
- Native name: 重庆对外建设集团
- Type: State-owned enterprise
- Industry: Engineering and construction
- Founded: 1985
- Headquarters: Chongqing, China
- Website: cqcico.com

China Chongqing International Construction Corporation (also known as CICO) is a Chinese construction and engineering company and subsidiary of Chongqing Foreign Trade and Economic Cooperation Group Co., Ltd. (CFTEC) It is known as a project contractor for road building in Africa.

The company has taken on several road projects in Uganda, including the following: (a) It is the contractor for the Export Import Bank of China funded $350 million Entebbe–Kampala Expressway. (b) Another road built by CICO, between 2010 and 2014 is the Fort Portal–Bundibugyo–Lamia Road. (c) In another project, partially funded by the Nordic Development Fund, it built from 2009 until 2010, the 42 kilometres (26 mi) Matugga–Kapeeka Road.

The government of Liberia signed a contract in 2012 with CICO to rehabilitate the Monrovia-Gbarnga-Ganta highway, one of West Africa's key roads, which had decayed following the Second Liberian Civil War. The $166-m project, funded by the World Bank and European Union, involves the paving of 180 km of road through 12 counties of the country, and the project contract contained provisions for the participation of Liberian-owned subcontractors. The government's goal in the project is to upgrade road connections to neighbouring countries that form the Mano River Union. In another World Bank funded project in Liberia, CICO was contracted in 2008 after the International Competitive Bidding process to build a $16-m Vai Town Bridge, which had earlier collapsed in 2007. The completed bridge was dedicated at the end of 2011.
