= Gabriel Opio =

Ugandan politician

- Born: 9 November 1945 (age 80); Uganda
- Citizenship: Uganda
- Education: Makerere University (Bachelor of Arts); University of Alberta (Master of Arts); University of British Columbia (Master of Science)
- Occupations: Economist, politician
- Years active: 1983 — present
- Known for: Politics

Gabriel Opio (born 9 November 1945) is a Ugandan economist and politician. He was the Minister of Gender, Labor & Social Development in the Cabinet of Uganda from 16 February 2009 to 27 May 2011. Before his service at the Gender Ministry, he served as the State Minister for Higher Education from June 2006 to February 2009.

== Early life and education ==
Opio was born on 9 November 1945. He holds a Bachelor of Arts degree in economics from Makerere University, Uganda's oldest university. His degree of Master of Arts in Economics was obtained from the University of Alberta, in Edmonton, Alberta, Canada. He also holds the degree of Master of Science in Finance from the University of British Columbia in Vancouver, British Columbia, Canada.

== Career ==
Between 1993 and 1996, he served as a member of the National Resistance Council for Samia-Bugwe constituency in Tororo District. In 1996, he was elected to the Ugandan Parliament, representing Samia-Bugwe South in the newly created Busia District. In 1999, he was appointed State Minister for Finance, responsible for planning and investments, serving in that position until 2001 when he lost his parliamentary seat to Simon Mayende.

Between 2002 and 2006, Opio served in various capacities, including as Director of National Water and Sewerage Corporation, Director of Centenary Bank, and Commissioner of the Uganda AIDS Commission. He served as the State Minister for Higher Education from June 2006 to February 2009, and as Minister of Gender, Labor & Social Development from 16 February 2009 to 27 May 2011.

In the national election cycle of 2011, he lost his parliamentary seat of Samia-Bugwe South to Julius Wandera Maganda, an independent political candidate. In the cabinet reshuffle of 27 May 2011, he was dropped from the Cabinet and replaced by Syda Bbumba.
