= Susan Kabonero Muhwezi =

- Citizenship: Uganda
- Education: Bachelor Of Education in English Language and Literature
- Occupation: entrepreneur
- Employer(s): Uganda Hotel Owners Association, Government of Uganda
- Organization(s): Uganda Hotel Owners Association, African Growth and Opportunity Act
- Spouse: Jim Muhwezi

Susan Kabonero Muhwezi is a Ugandan entrepreneur. As of 2021, she served as the chairperson of Uganda Hotel Owners Association and vice chairperson of the board of directors for Uganda Tourism Board. although no longer holds that role.

== Early life, family and education ==
Kabonero Muhwezi holds a Bachelor of Education degree in English Language and Literature.

== Career ==
In 2019 she was elected as the chairperson Uganda Hotel Owners Association, a position she continued to hold until at least 2024. She is an advisor to the President of Uganda and the nation's government on matters related to the African Growth and Opportunity, aiming to enhance Ugandan's trade relations and opportunities. Muhwezi has a significant role in public–private sector collaboration. In 2026, she was elected to the board of the Private Sector Foundation Uganda (PSFU), representing the tourism and hospitality sector. Her appointment was widely viewed as a strategic move to strengthen tourism’s voice within national economic planning.

== Personal life ==
Muhwezi is married to Jim Muhwezi, a lawyer and politician who As of March 2026 is Uganda's Security Minister. She has two brothers, the Diplomat and head of department of Regional Economic Cooperation, at the Uganda Ministry of Foreign Affairs Richard Kabonero and the businessman and one of the wealthiest people in Uganda Bob Kabonero.

== See also ==
- Sylvia Owori
- Maria Kiwanuka
