= Audette Exel =

Businesswoman and philanthropist

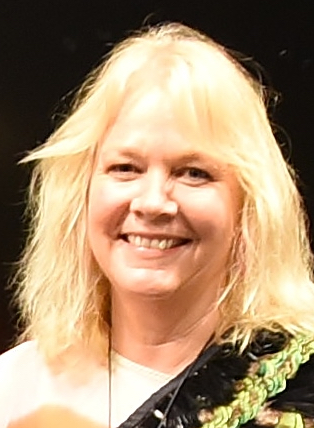
- ...
- Born: 14 January 1963 (age 63)
- Occupation: Founder of Adara Group
- Website: www.adaragroup.org

Audette Exel AO (born 14 January 1963) is a New Zealand-born businesswomen and philanthropist, best known for founding the Adara Group which has offices in Australia, the United States, Uganda, Nepal and Bermuda. In 2013, she was made an honorary Officer in the Order of Australia for her philanthropic work.

== Biography ==
=== Early life and career ===
Exel was born in New Zealand in 1963, to Mary and David Exel. She earned a law degree from the University of Melbourne.

Exel began her career with Allen, Allen and Hemsley in Sydney, Australia from 1985 to 1986, before joining the English firm of Linklaters & Paines in their Hong Kong office. She transitioned to a career in banking law in Bermuda, later running a Bermudan bank, becoming Chairman of the Bermuda Stock Exchange, and joining the board of the Bermuda Monetary Authority.

=== The Adara Group ===
At the age of 35, Exel established the Isis Group (now Adara Group), which consists of two Sydney-based corporate advisory businesses and an international development organization called Adara Development (formerly the Isis Foundation). Since 1998, the businesses have channelled their profits into Adara Development. The Adara Group is focused on improving health and education for people living in poverty in Nepal and Uganda.

In September 2021, Exel was appointed to the board of Westpac.

== Honours ==
In 2012, Exel was named the Telstra NSW Business Woman of the Year. In 2013, she was made an honorary Officer in the Order of Australia for “service to humanity through the establishment of the Adara Group to provide specialist care to women and children in Uganda and Nepal.”

In 2014, Exel was recognized by Forbes as one of 48 "Heroes of Philanthropy" in the Asia-Pacific region. In 2016, she was named Australia's "Leading Philanthropist" by Philanthropy Australia.
