= International School of Uganda =

Location
- 272/3 Lubowa Terrace, off Entebbe Road Kampala, Uganda; Kampala; Uganda
- Coordinates: 0.234657°N 32.565508°E

Information
- School type: Private international school
- Established: 1967
- Grades: Preschool–12
- Gender: Coeducational
- Enrollment: 615 (2023-2024)
- Colors: Yellow and black
- Mascot: Leopard
- Website: www.isu.ac.ug

International School of Uganda (ISU) is an international school in Kampala, Uganda. It serves students ages 3 through 19. The school is authorized to offer three International Baccalaureate programs and is also accredited by the Middle States Association of Colleges and Schools and the Council of International Schools.

The school was established in 1967 as the Lincoln School and was the first international school in Uganda.

The 33-acre (13 ha) campus is about 5 kilometres (3.1 mi) from Lake Victoria and is located in the outskirts of Kampala in a suburban setting, in the district of Lubowa.

== Student body ==
The student body is multicultural with 615 students from about 60 countries.

== Facilities ==
The 33-acre ISU campus is home to many indigenous plants and bird-life. The campus has a science center built in 2014, a library of over 25,000 volumes, two sports fields, a sports hall, two swimming pools, four tennis courts, and an outdoor garden. The arts center includes a recording studio and a 400-seat theater.

== See also ==
- Rainbow International School
- Kampala International School
- École Française Les Grands Lacs
