= Kiwoko Hospital =

Private community hospital in Uganda

- Church of Uganda

Geography
- Location: Kiwoko, Nakaseke District, Central Region, Uganda
- Coordinates: 00°50′23″N 32°21′40″E

Organisation
- Care system: Private
- Type: Community hospital

Services
- Emergency department: I
- Beds: 250

History
- Founded: 1991

Links
- Website: Homepage
- Other links: Hospitals in Uganda

Kiwoko Hospital is a private community hospital, in the Central Region of Uganda. The hospital is affiliated with the Church of Uganda.

== Location ==
The hospital is located in the town of Kiwoko, in Nakaseke District. Kiwoko is in the Luweero Triangle, about 77 kilometres (48 mi), by road, north-west of Mulago National Referral Hospital, in Kampala, Uganda's capital and largest city. The geographical coordinates of Kiwoko Hospital are: 0°50'23.0"N, 32°21'40.0"E (Latitude:0.839722; Longitude:32.361111).

== Overview ==
Kiwoko Hospital is a 250-bed community hospital administered by the Church of Uganda through the Uganda Protestant Medical Bureau. The hospital is operated with donations made to the Friends of Kiwoko Hospital.

When the hospital was founded in 1991, Kiwoko was in the Luweero District. However, when Nakaseke District was carved out of Luweero District in 2005, Kiwoko went with Nakaseke District. Kiwoko, however, remains in the Luweero Triangle, which roughly corresponds to the area covered by present-day Luweero District and Nakaseke District or Luweero District alone, before the split.

== History ==
In 1988 Ian Clarke, a general practitioner from Bangor in Northern Ireland, traveled to Uganda with his young family with the intention of starting a community-based health care program. Initial work was done in partnership with the Kasana Orphanage.

Upon the death of an expatriate visitor to the area, Barbara Kelly, a memorial fund was established in her name, raising an initial £25,000. That initial donation enabled construction to start on the first permanent building. Two years later, and through continued donations, the Barbara Kelly Memorial Hospital was completed.

Kiwoko Hospital, as it was later renamed, was formally opened in September 1991 by the then vice president of Uganda, the Samson Kisekka. In 1997, the hospital established a partnership with Adara Development. In November 2001 the hospital celebrated its tenth anniversary, and boasted over 220 beds, a laboratory, a laboratory assistant training school, a nurse training school, and an active community-based health care programme. In November 2021, as the hospital celebrated 30 years of existence, the Ministry of Health of Uganda recognized its Neonatal Intensive Care Unit as a centre of excellence in newborn health in Uganda.

== See also ==
- Hospitals in Uganda

== More information ==
There are two books published about the hospital, both by New Wine Press:

- The Man with the Key has Gone by Ian Clarke, which discusses the origins
- There is a Snake in my Cupboard by Dr. Nick Wooding, which carries on the story till 2003
