= Conscious business =

Business concept

Conscious business enterprises are those which choose to follow a multiple stakeholder approach, as opposed to 'traditional business' strategy, which focuses primarily on shareholders and profit maximisation. In contrast, conscious businesses can be double-bottom line, triple-bottom line, or more, by focusing on other stakeholders (beyond shareholders) such as employees, customers, measurable positive societal impact, the community, or the environment.

The conscious capitalism movement in the U.S. emerged from the theory of corporate social responsibility, which pushes for a "values-based" approach where values represent social and environmental concerns both locally and globally. This effort is related to not-just-for-profit business models, conscious consumerism, conscious leadership, impact investing, and conscious capitalism. The conscious capitalism movement has grown to include Benefit corporations, which are now legal in 36 states, and impact investing, which has grown to more than $25 billion in assets under management. Awareness of the conscious capitalism movement grew from the Presidential campaign of Jason Palmer.

There is an alternative way of thinking about conscious business emerging in the U.K., and perhaps other countries, which tries to avoid reification, regarding it less as a thing or a type of business which can be categorised, and more as an ongoing process including awareness, self-awareness, awareness of purpose, practice (social theory) and relationships.

In Italy, De Nardi Gianluca illustrates through the use of business cases how every company could adopt conscious business processes.

== Conscious business criteria ==
=== Doing no harm ===
It is generally agreed upon that the product or service of a conscious business should not be intrinsically harmful to humans or the environment. However, it is possible for such a business to be taking part in the conscious business movement if it is taking conscious steps to be more aware of its social and environmental effects, and to adopt more beneficial social or environmental practices.

=== Triple Bottom Line Model ===
Most conscious businesses subscribe to a Triple Bottom Line model of success. They aim to provide positive value in the domains of people, planet, and profit. The phrase "Triple Bottom Line" was coined by business writer John Elkington in 1994.

== See also ==
- B Corporation (certification)
- Business ethics
- False consciousness
- Marketing
- Sustainable business
