= Butalangu =

- Map of Uganda showing the location of Butalangu
- Coordinates: 0°49'22.0"N 32°14'34.0"E 00°49′22″N 32°14′34″E
- Country: Uganda
- Region: Central Uganda
- District: Nakaseke District
- Constituency: Nakaseke North

Government
  - Member of Parliament: Syda Bbumba

Population (2014 census)
  - Total: 3,873
- Time zone: UTC+3 (EAT)

Butalangu is a town in Central Uganda. It is the political and administrative center of Nakaseke District.

== Location ==
Butalangu is located west of Luweero, the largest town in the sub-region. The Luweero–Butalangu road measures approximately 29 kilometres (18 mi). The geographical coordinates of Butalangu are:0°49'22.0"N, 32°14'34.0"E (Latitude:0.822778; Longitude:32.242778).

== Population ==
During the national census and household survey of 27 and 28 August 2014, the Uganda Bureau of Statistics (UBOS), enumerated the population of Butalangu at 3,873 people.

== Points of interest ==
The Uganda National Roads Authority (UNRA) has requested parliamentary approval to tarmac the Luweero–Butalangu Road from gravel surface to class II bitumen with drainage channels and culverts. The improvements are budgeted at US$40 million co-financed by the Arab Bank for Economic Development in Africa (BADEA) and the OPEC Fund for International Development (OFID), and are expected to last two years.

A modern abattoir and meat-processing plant are planned within the town limits. The joint venture between Nakaseke District local government and Uganda Meat Producers Cooperative Union (UMPCU) is expected to receive donor assistance from Norway.

== See also ==
- Luweero Triangle
