= Thembo Nyombi =

Ugandan politician (born 1964)

- Born: 31 July 1964 (age 62); Uganda
- Citizenship: Uganda
- Education: Makerere University (Bachelor of Arts); Bradford University (Diploma in Project Planning & Management); Uganda Martyrs University (MSc in Development Economics) (Diploma in Financial Management)
- Occupations: Economist & Politician
- Years active: 1990 — present
- Known for: Politics

George William Thembo Nyombi (born 31 July 1964) is a Ugandan economist and politician. He is the executive director Uganda Communications Commission a position he assumed on 24 November 2023 and a former State Minister for Information Technology in the Ugandan Cabinet. He was appointed to that position on 27 May 2011. He replaced Alintuma Nsambu, who was dropped from the Cabinet. Prior to that, he served as the State Minister for Luweero Triangle in the Office of the Prime Minister, from 2009 until 2011. Nyombi Thembo is also a former Member of Parliament (MP), for "Kassanda County South", Mubende District. He has continuously represented the constituency since 2001.

== Early life and education ==
Nyombi was born on 31 July 1964 in Mubende District, in a family of thirteen. His father was Erisa Zziwa Bosomungho, from the Ndomboli royal family in Zenzeka, Boma, in the '''Democratic Republic of Congo'''. His mother was Eseza Ziribasanga, who also had a Congolese Origin. The father migrated to Uganda in 1924, due to social and political upheavals in the region and finally settled in Kassanda, Singo County, in modern-day Mubende District. Nyombi attended Lubiri Secondary School in Kampala, for his A-Level education. Thembo Nyombi graduated with a Bachelor of Arts degree from Makerere University, the oldest and largest of Uganda's public universities. He holds a diploma in project planning and management from Bradford University in the United Kingdom and a postgraduate diploma in financial management from Uganda Martyrs University (UMU) in Uganda. His degree of Master of Science in Development Economics was awarded by UMU.

== Career ==
Between 1990 and 1996, Thembo Nyombi was a part-time economics teacher at Uphill College, a high school in Uganda. He worked as an analyst, planning officer and senior planning officer for the Uganda Railways Corporation during the 1990s. Between 1995 and 2001, he worked at a Project Manager, Transport Rehabilitation Project (Railway Component), at Kampala City Council. He was elected to the Ugandan Parliament in 2001, representing Kassanda County South in Mubende District. That same year, he was appointed Minister of State for Education and Sports (Primary Education). In 2006, he was re-elected to parliament and was appointed to his last cabinet post.

== Personal life ==
Thembo Nyombi is a member of the National Resistance Movement political party. He was married to Prisca Mashengyero Thembo. On the evening of Saturday, 28 July 2012, at about 10pm, she was killed in an automobile accident when the utility vehicle she was driving was struck by another vehicle at Bwebajja, on the Kampala-Entebbe Road.

== See also ==
- Parliament of Uganda
- Cabinet of Uganda
- Mubende District
