= Bob Kabonero =

Ugandan businessman and entrepreneur

- Born: 1965 (age 60–61); Uganda
- Citizenship: Uganda
- Education: Oxford Brookes University (Bachelor of Arts in Business administration)
- Occupations: Entrepreneur and businessman
- Years active: 1992–present
- Known for: Wealth

Bob Kabonero is a businessman and entrepreneur in Uganda. According to a 2012 published report, he was one of the wealthiest people in Uganda.

== Early life and education ==
Bob Kabonero was born in Uganda circa 1965, the youngest of his parents' three children. The eldest, Susan Muhwezi, is married to Ugandan Security Minister Jim Muhwezi. His older brother, Richard Kabonero, is Uganda's ambassador to Tanzania. Bob Kabonero received a Bachelor of Arts in business administration and retail management from Oxford Brookes University in Oxford, England .

== Businesses and investments ==
Bob Kabonero is the Chairman of the Board of Governors of Vienna College. Among his business interests are the Kampala Casino and the Pyramids Casino. He also owns a logistics company, an import goods business, and the Europcar franchise in Uganda. Kabonero is the chairman of Park Hospitality Limited, the owners of the proposed Kampala Radisson Blue Hotel, which is being developed in partnership with the Carlson Rezidor Hotel Group.

== Net worth ==
According to the New Vision newspaper, Kabonero had a net worth of about US$250 million in 2019.

== See also ==
- New Vision
- Suzan Muhwezi
- Jim Muhwezi
