= Gombe, Wakiso =

- Location in Uganda
- Coordinates: 00°29′51″N 32°28′26″E
- Country: Uganda
- Region: Central Region of Uganda
- District: Wakiso District

Gombe, is a small town in Wakiso District in the Central Region of Uganda.

== Location ==
Gombe is approximately 3 kilometres (1.9 mi), by road, northwest of Matugga on the Matugga-Kapeeka Road. Gombe is approximately 23 kilometres (14 mi), by road, north of Kampala, the capital and largest city of Uganda. The coordinates of the town are 0°29'19.0"N 32°28'50.0"E (Latitude:0.488599; Longitude:32.480550).

== Landmarks ==
The landmarks within the town limits or close to the edges of the town include:

- administrative headquarters of Gombe sub-county, an administrative unit within Butambala District Administration
- headquarters of Gombe Town Council
- Gombe central market

== See also ==
- Gombe, Butambala
- List of cities and towns in Uganda
