= Kampala International School =

School in Kampala, Uganda

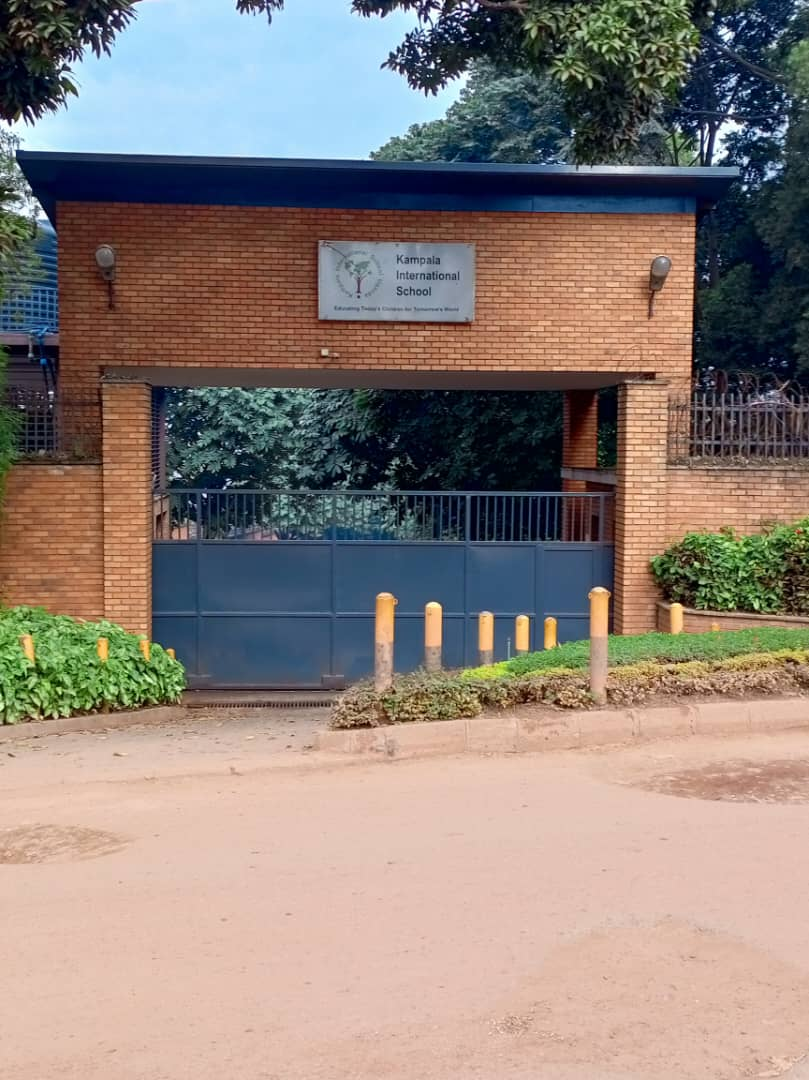

Information
- Former name: Kabira International School of Uganda
- School type: International school
- Established: 1993; 33 years ago
- Teaching staff: c.100
- Years: Kindergarten 2 - Year 13
- Age: 2 to 18
- Capacity: c.1500
- Website: www.kisu.com

The Kampala International School (KISU) is an international school in Kampala, Uganda, located in the neighborhood of Bukoto. It was formerly named Kabira International School of Uganda.

== History ==
KISU was established in 1993 with a student body of 67 individuals.

=== New Campus ===
A new campus was constructed in 2008 to expand capacity for a larger student population and drastically upgrade facilities for a total cost of USh 11 billion (US$5.8 million at the time). The new campus contains primary and secondary sections, four science laboratories, three computer laboratories, an eight-lane swimming pool, two amphitheatres, and multiple fully equipped and multimedia enabled classrooms. These renovations gave KISU the capacity to accommodate up to 1,500 students and over 100 faculty members.

== Curriculum ==
=== Primary school ===
Kampala International School of Uganda has a primary section for students aged 2 to approximately 10/11 years of age. The school broadly follows the National Curriculum for England, modified to take into account the school's location and international student body.

KISU's Early years department incorporates KG2 (2 years of age), KG3 (3 years of age) and Reception (4 years of age). Key Stage 1 (KS1) incorporates Year 1 (5 years of age) and Year 2 (6 years of age). Key Stage 2 (KS2) incorporates Year 3 (7 years of age), Year 4 (8 years of age), Year 5 (9 years of age) and Year 6 (10 years of age) In the Primary section, there are 2 or 3 classes per year group, depending on student numbers. Each class has both a teacher and at least one Teaching Assistant (T.A.).

=== Secondary school ===
Secondary is from Years 7–13. Key Stage 3 incorporates Years 7-9 (approx 11-14 years of age) and these students continue to study the National Curriculum for England, modified to reflect the nature of the school. In Years 10 and 11 (15 to 16 years of age) students study an IGCSE programme. These examinations are undertaken through the Cambridge University and assessed by external examinations at the end of Year 11. In Years 12 and 13 (17 and 18 years of age) students study the International Baccalaureate Diploma Programme, a 2-year pre-university course.
