= Syda Bbumba =

Ugandan politician (born 1952)

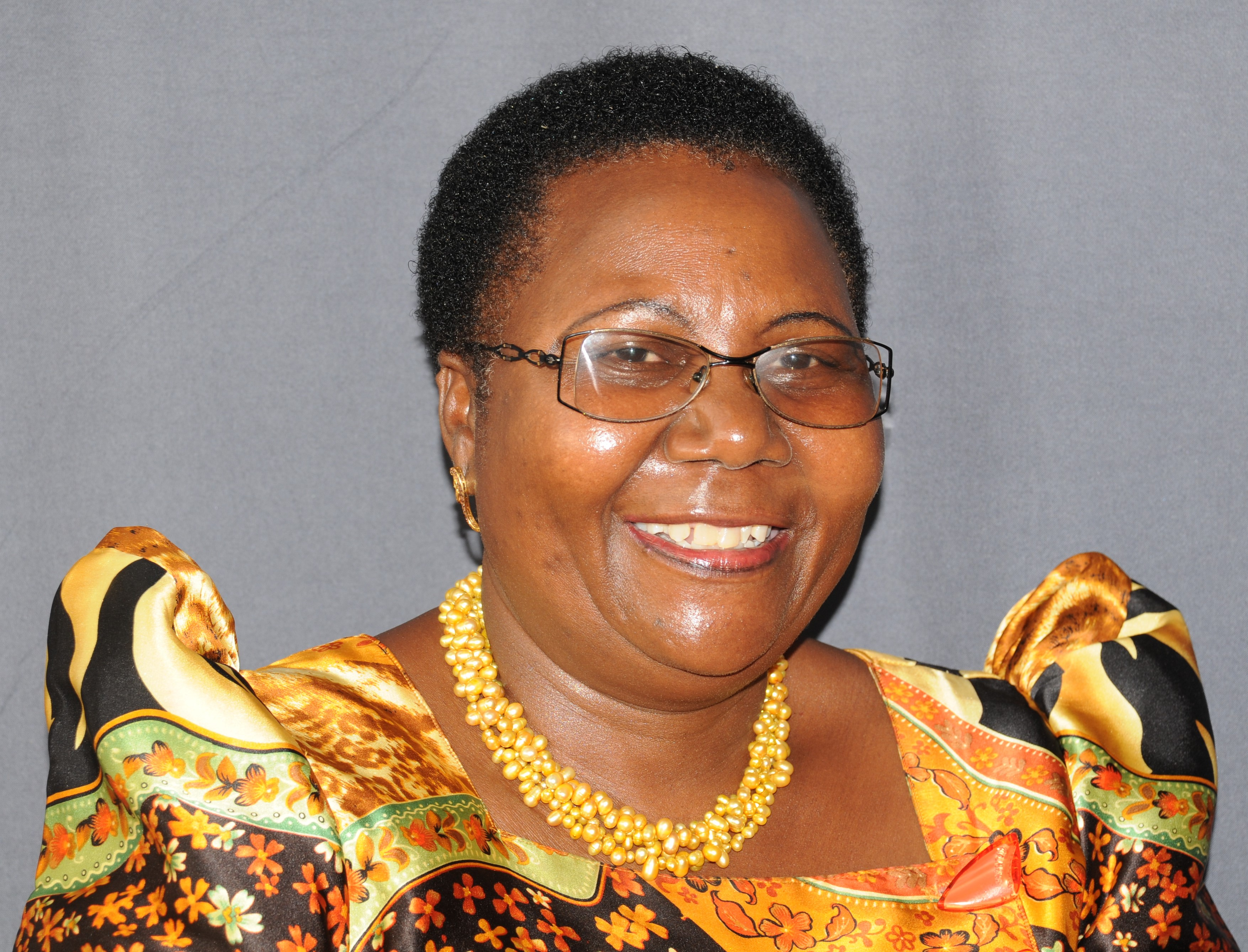

Minister of Gender, Labor & Social Development
- In office 2011–2012

Minister of Finance
- In office 2009–2011
- President: Yoweri Museveni
- Prime Minister: Apolo Nsibambi
- Preceded by: Ezra Suruma
- Succeeded by: Maria Kiwanuka

Minister of Gender, Labor & Social Development
- In office 2006–2008

Minister of Energy and Minerals
- In office 2002–2006

Personal details
- Born: January 7, 1952 (age 74) Nakaseke, Uganda
- Education: Makerere University; University of East Anglia; Kampala International University

Syda Namirembe Bbumba (last name sometimes spelled Bumba) (born 7 January 1952) is a Ugandan accountant, politician and banker. She served in the Cabinet of Uganda as Minister of Energy and Minerals from 2002 to 2006, Minister of Gender, Labor and Social Development from 2006 to 2008, Minister of Finance from 2009 to 2011, and Minister of Gender, Labor and Social Development again from 2011 to 2012. She was also the elected Member of Parliament for Nakaseke County North, Nakaseke District. She was the Chairperson of the Parliamentary Committee on National Economy and also Chairperson of the Parliamentary Islamic Banking Forum. She was Sub-Saharan Africa's representative to the OIC Women Advisory Panel.

== Early life and education ==
Syda Bbumba was born on 7 January 1952. She attended Trinity College Nabbingo for her high school education. She also attended Makerere College School before she entered university.

She holds a Bachelor of Commerce (BCom) degree in Accounting, obtained from Makerere University in 1974. She attended the University of East Anglia in the United Kingdom, and holds a diploma in business finance from a university in Greece. Her Master of Business Administration (MBA), was obtained from Kampala International University in 2006.

== Career ==
Syda Bbumba worked as an accountant and treasury manager for 21 years at Uganda Development Bank, from 1974 until 1995. She was a member of the Uganda Electoral Commission in 1996 prior to being elected to the Parliament of Uganda, representing Nakaseke County in Nakaseke District. She has continually represented that constituency in the Ugandan parliament. She is the incumbent.

From 2002 until 2006, she was the Minister of Energy & Minerals. From 2006 until 2008, she served as the Minister of Gender, Labor and Social Affairs. Bbumba has reported on the many long-term environmental problems that growing population has contributed to, but President Yoweri Museveni often still urges Ugandans to produce more children.

From 18 February 2009 until 27 May 2011 she served as the Minister of Finance, being the first woman to serve in that capacity in the history of the country. She was again appointed as Minister of Gender, Labor & Social Development on 27 May 2011, replacing Gabriel Opio, who was dropped from the Cabinet. She resigned from cabinet on 16 February 2012 on allegations of mismanagement of government funds however she retained her parliamentary seat.

== Other roles ==
With her appointment as Uganda's Finance Minister, Syda Bbumba also became the Chairperson of the Governing Council of the East African Development Bank (EADB). Also in her role as Minister of Finance, she became responsible for the National Social Security Fund (NSSF), a quasi-government organ that used to be under the Ministry of Gender, Labor and Social Development, which she had just left. The NSSF was moved from the Gender Ministry to the Finance Ministry in October 2004. In a cabinet reshuffle on 27 May 2011, Syda Bbumba was moved back to the Gender Ministry as the new Minister. She was replaced by Maria Kiwanuka at the Finance Ministry.

== See also ==
- Cabinet of Uganda
- Nakaseke District
- Parliament of Uganda
