= Nordic Development Fund =

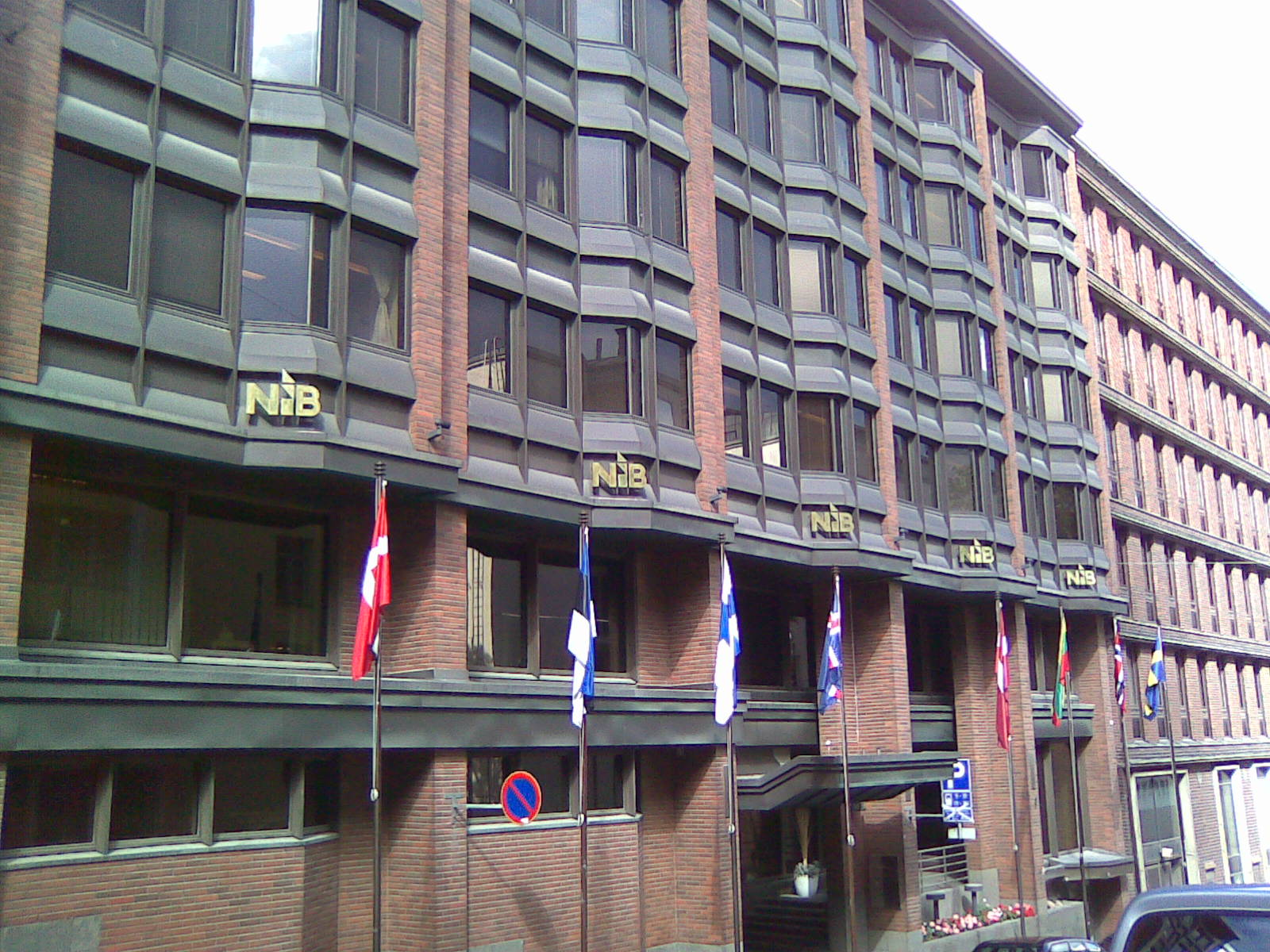
The Nordic Development fund shares its offices with the Nordic Investment Bank in Helsinki

The Nordic Development Fund is the joint multilateral development finance institution of Denmark, Finland, Iceland, Norway and Sweden. It was established in 1989 and adheres to the development assistance policies of the Nordic countries and has financed 190 development assistance credits valued at EUR 1 billion. The NDF provides grants to climate change related investments under its new mandate, established in 2009. NDF offices are located in Helsinki, Finland.

The objective of the Nordic Development Fund's (NDF) operations is to facilitate climate change investments in low-income countries. NDF grants are made in cooperation with bilateral and multilateral development institutions. NDF’s operations mirror the Nordic countries’ priorities in the areas of climate change and poverty reduction. The operations are financed from the development cooperation budgets of the five Nordic countries.

== See also ==
- Nordic Investment Bank
