= Luwero Triangle =

Historical region in central Uganda associated with the Ugandan Bush War (1981–1986)

Luweero Triangle Luwero Triangle
- Historical region
- Country: Uganda
- Region: Central Region (Uganda)
- Cultural region: Buganda
- Associated conflict: Ugandan Bush War (1981–1986)
- Named for: Luweero District
- Time zone: UTC+3 (EAT)

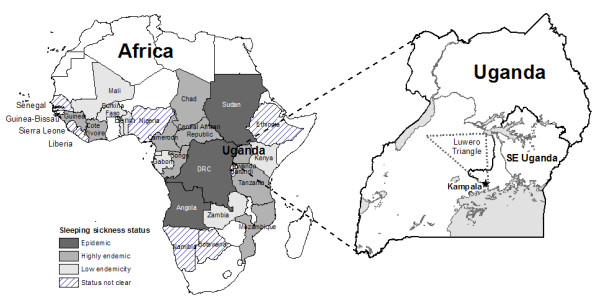
Map of Uganda, showcasing the approximate area of the Luwero Triangle.

The Luweero Triangle, sometimes spelled Luwero Triangle, is an area of Uganda north of the capital Kampala, where, in 1981, Yoweri Museveni started the guerrilla war that propelled him and his National Resistance Movement into power in 1986. The war was fought between the National Resistance Army led by Yoweri Museveni and the army of the late Milton Obote.

Museveni starts his campaigns in Luwero Triangle in recognition of its historical support.

== Overview ==
Luwero Triangle Medal (Uganda) - ribbon bar

The area was notorious for the persecution of civilians during the Ugandan Bush War, between the rebel National Resistance Army and the government of Milton Obote. Many residents were either forcibly recruited, displaced or killed by both sides during the war, as Museveni's guerrilla forces started their advance from Kyankwanzi southeast toward Kampala.

Much as the Luwero Triangle is famously known as a result of the Uganda bush war, it has rich cultural heritage and attracts both local and international tourists. It is also known for agriculture because of its fertile soils and good climate.

The following Buganda districts constitute the Luweero Triangle:

- Kiboga District
- Kyankwanzi District, formerly part of Kiboga
- Nakaseke District, formerly part of Luweero
- Nakasongola District, formerly part of Luweero
- Luweero District
- Mubende District
- Mityana District, formerly part of Mubende
- Wakiso District, formerly part of Mpigi

Alice Kaboyo is the State Minister for the Luwero Triangle. In 2025, 6.1 billion shillings was secured by the Ministry of Luwero Triangle to compensate veterans ahead of the upcoming Presidential campaigns.

== History ==
=== Background and insurgency (1981–1986) ===
After the disputed 1980 elections, Museveni’s group began an armed rebellion. The early guerrilla campaign took root in and around the Luweero area, with recruitment and support networks tied to local communities and to wider political dynamics in central Uganda.

=== Counter-insurgency and civilian impact ===
Multiple sources describe severe civilian suffering during the war in the Luweero area, including killings, forced recruitment, and displacement. Human Rights Watch reported that the International Committee of the Red Cross estimated at least 300,000 deaths in the Luweero Triangle after the war, and also reported large losses within specific communities during the conflict period. Other scholarship and policy research note that estimates vary widely across authors and datasets for Uganda’s 1970s–1980s political violence, including the Uganda Bush War period.

A 1986 UN document on Uganda described extensive physical destruction in the Luweero Triangle during the 1981–1986 period, including the devastation of villages and local infrastructure.

== Memorials and commemoration ==
Luweero is closely linked to national remembrance of the Bush War. Memorial sites and commemorative practices include the preservation and display of human remains from mass graves and the marking of former conflict sites, which have also been discussed in academic work on memory, politics, and post-war legitimacy.

Media reporting has also documented disputes and security concerns around memorial sites, including theft and mishandling of displayed remains.

== Governance and development programmes ==
Ugandan government structures have, at different times, assigned political responsibility for the Luweero Triangle within the executive, including a designated State Minister role linked to the Luweero Triangle and the Rwenzori region.

The area has also been referenced in government recovery and development programming. The Luweero-Rwenzori Development Programme (LRDP) has been described in policy work as a post-conflict development intervention aimed at reconstruction and socio-economic recovery in selected districts.

== See also ==
- Luweero District
- Alice Kaboyo
- Districts of Uganda
- Ugandan Bush War
- National Resistance Movement
- Nakaseke District
- Nakasongola District
- Kiboga District
