= Nakaseke District =

Nakaseke District Rukiiga
- District
- District location in Uganda
- Coordinates: 00°44′N 32°25′E
- Country: Uganda
- Region: Central Region, Uganda
- Capital: Butalangu

Area
  - Land: 3,477.3 km^{2} (1,342.6 sq mi)
- Elevation: 1,200 m (3,900 ft)

Population (2012 Estimate)
  - Total: 191,100
  - Density: 55/km^{2} (140/sq mi)
- Time zone: UTC+3 (EAT)
- Website: www.nakaseke.go.ug

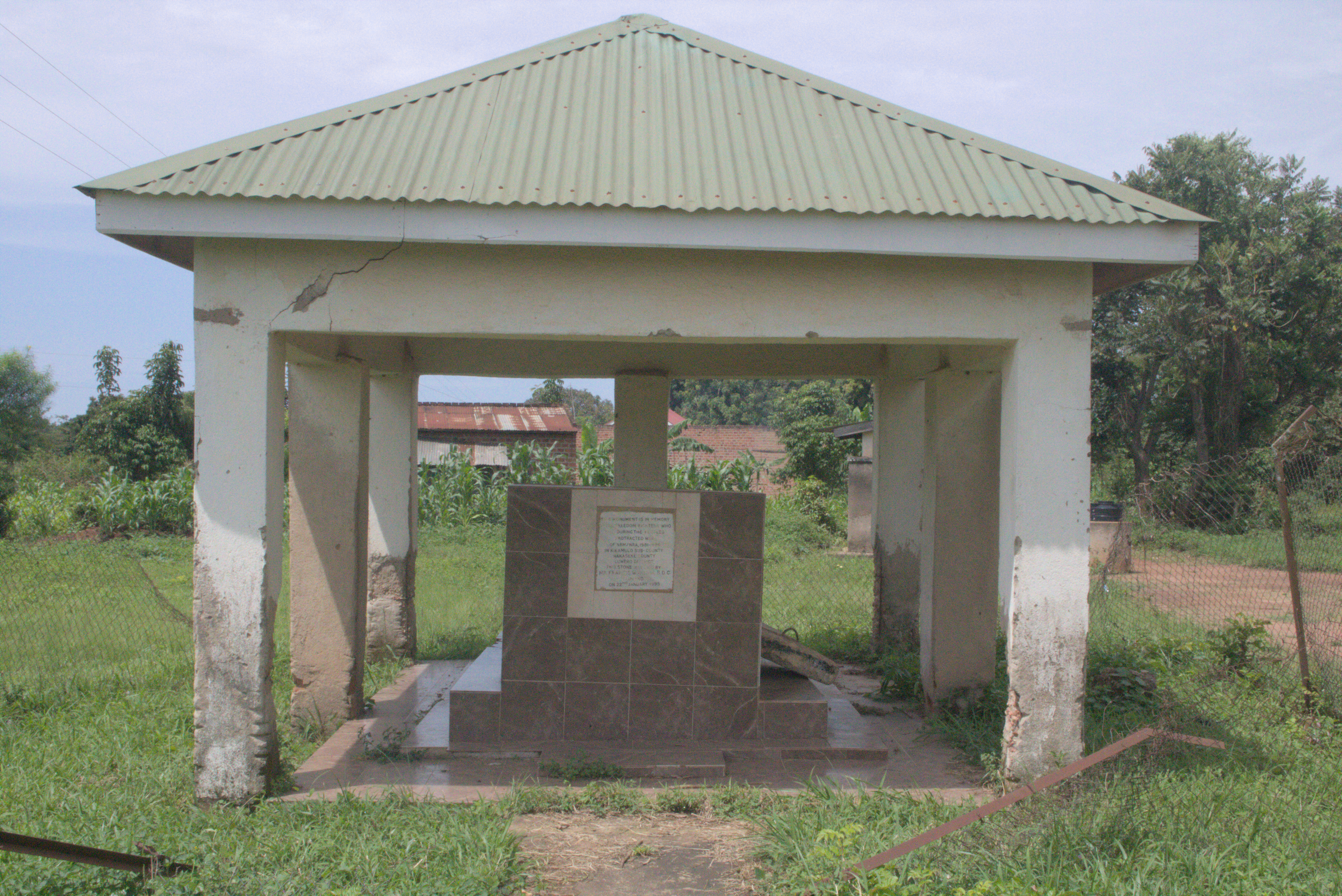
Kikamulo War Memorial, Mass grave and Memorial in Nakaseke District, Kikamulo sub-county for the people that died in the NRA war.

Nakaseke District is a district in Central Uganda. It is named after Nakaseke, the largest town in the district. However, the district headquarters are located at Butalangu.

== Location ==
Nakaseke District is bordered by Nakasongola District to the north and northeast, Luweero District to the southeast, Wakiso District to the south, Mityana District to the southwest. Kiboga District and Kyankwanzi District lie to the west and Masindi District lies to the northwest. Butalangu, the location of the district headquarters, lies approximately 66 kilometres (41 mi), by road, north of Kampala, the capital and the largest city of Uganda. The coordinates of the district are:00 44N, 32 25E.

== Overview ==
Nakaseke District was created out of Luweero District on 20 July 2005, with operations effective 11 August 2005:

It estimated that 59.2 percent of the Nakaseke District community is literate, which is largely limited to the local Luganda language. A Primary Teachers' Training College has been built in Nakaseke.

Nakaseke District has seven health units including a 100-bed public hospital, Nakaseke Hospital, administered by the Uganda Ministry of Health. Nakaseke Hospital is connected to other health units by a radio. There is also a community hospital at Kiwoko, Kiwoko Hospital, administrated by the Church of Uganda where there are five doctors, six medical assistants, 23 midwives and 33 nurses, as of 2010.

Access to clean water is possible through a network of boreholes and a protected springs. One of the major health concerns is the high prevalence of HIV/AIDS in the district. As of March 2014, the prevalence rate of the disease in the district was estimated at 8%, compared to the national average of 6.5%. Nakaseke District has the sixth-highest prevalence rate of HIV/AIDS in the entire country's 112 districts.

== Administrative divisions ==
Nakaseke District is divided into the following administrative units:

1. Kapeeka
2. Ngoma
3. Kinyogoga
4. Wakyaato
5. Nakaseke Town Council
6. Kasangombe
7. Semuto
8. Kikamulo

== Population ==
The 1991 Uganda national census estimated the population of Nakaseke District at about 93,800. The 2002 national census put the district population at about 137,300 inhabitants, with an annual growth rate of 3.3%. In 2012, the population of the district was estimated at 191,100.

== Economic activity ==
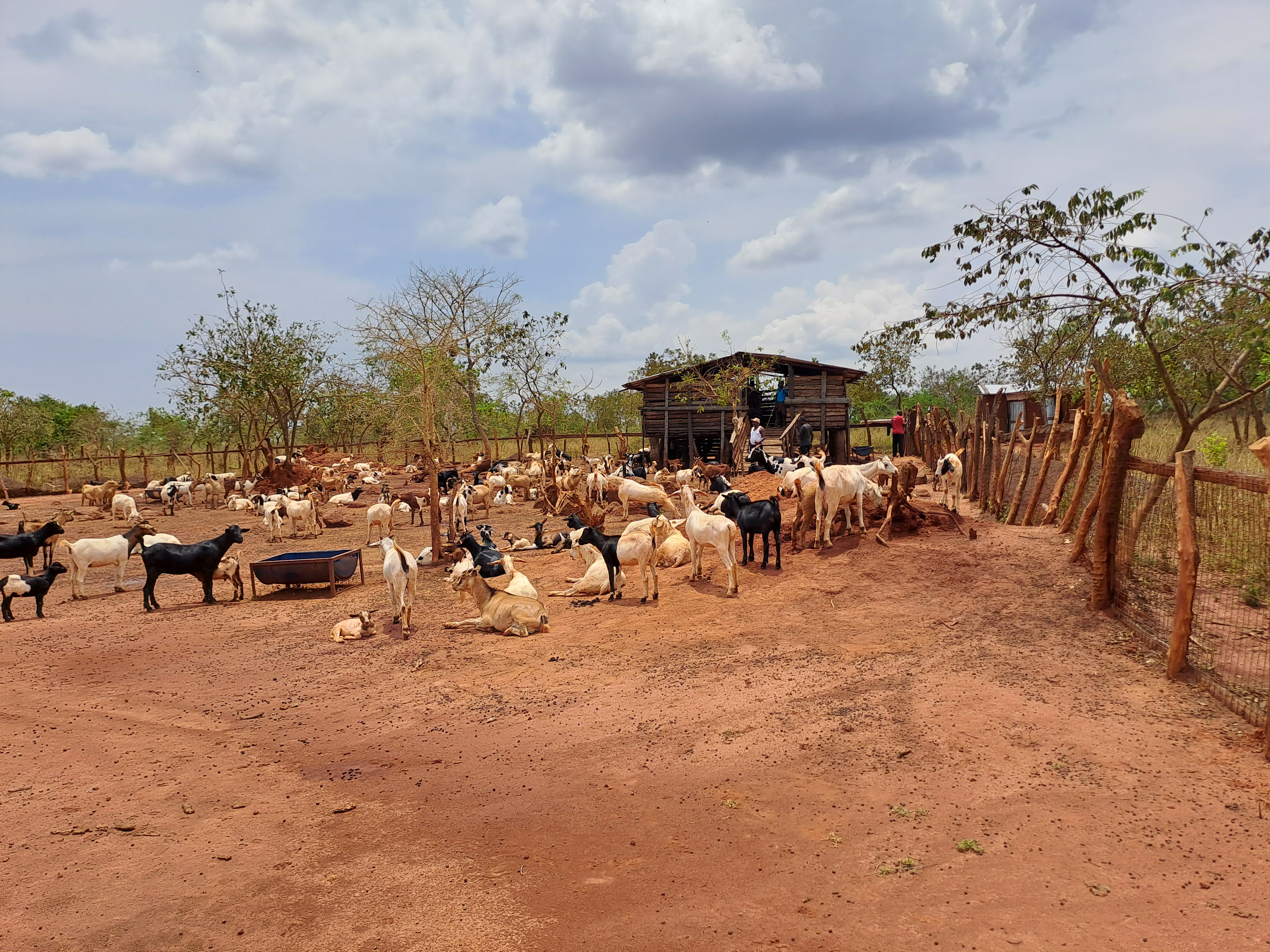
Goat rearing Kaswa, Nakaseke District.

Farming is the main economic activity in the districts. Activities include the cultivation of coffee, maize, beans, bananas, cassava, sweet potatoes, vegetables such as tomatoes, cabbage and fruits including pineapples and mangoes. Fishing in the area swamps, raising of cattle (for meat and milk), goats and chicken are some of the activities carried out in the area. About 90 percent of the farmers use traditional farming methods and techniques. The produce finds ready market in Kampala.

== See also ==
- Nakaseke
- Central Region, Uganda
- Nakaseke Hospital
- Districts of Uganda
