= Gladys Nsibirwa Wambuzi =

- Born: 9 September 1932; Kampala, Uganda
- Died: January 2005 (aged 72); Nairobi,Kenya
- Other name: Gladys Wambuzi
- Citizenship: Ugandan
- Education: King's College, Budo; Gayaza High School; Buloba Teachers College
- Occupations: Educator, educationist
- Known for: Co-founding Greenhill Academy
- Spouse: Samuel Wako Wambuzi

Gladys Nsibirwa Wambuzi also known as Gladys Wambuzi (9 September 1932 – January 2005) was a Ugandan educator and educationist who taught in Uganda, Kenya and the United Kingdom.

== Early life and education background ==
Gladys was born on 9 September 1932 at Mengo Hospital in Kampala, Uganda. She was the daughter of Martin Luther Nsibirwa OBE, who served as Katikkiro (Prime Minister) of Buganda.

She began her primary education at Lubiri Primary School before joining King's College Budo in 1938 where she served as a monitor in Grace House and choir member of Nightingales choir. Gladys left King's College Budo in 1950 after obtaining her Cambridge School Certificate and she joined Gayaza High School in 1951. In 1952, she joined Buloba Teachers College on the junior secondary teacher-training course.

== Career ==
Gladys began her teaching career in 1954 at Ndejje Teachers Training College and King's College Budo between 1954 and 1955. In 1956, she taught at Iganga Girls School and later at Agalia Awamu Kasawo. She continued teaching at Matale Junior Secondary School in 1960 and Lubiri Secondary School in 1961.

Between 1962 and 1964, Gladys served as headmistress of Nkumba Secondary School, an institution that later became associated with the development of Nkumba University. In 1965, she taught at Muslim Girls School. In 1966, she became headmistress of Mengo Girls School and during her leadership, the school was transformed into a co-educational institution and became Mengo Primary School.

From 1976 to 1979, Gladys taught at Lavington Primary School in Nairobi, Kenya and from 1980 to 1993, she worked at Kampala Parents School, where she served as Director of Academics. In 1994, she co-founded Greenhill Academy in Kampala together with her sister Janet Nsibirwa Mdoe and other educators. While at this school, she served as the headteacher and chairperson of Greenhill Holdings.

She also served on the boards of governors of Trinity College Nabbingo and King's College Budo and on the education board of Kakira schools.

== Personal life ==
Gladys Nsibirwa married Samuel Wako Wambuzi, who later became Chief Justice of Uganda, in January 1956. Their wedding took place at St Francis Chapel. The couple had children, including William, Marion and Samson Wambuzi.

== Death ==
Gladys died in January 2005 at the age of 72 after suffering from cancer and she was buried at her family home in Kaliro, Kamuli District.

== See also ==
- Joyce Mpanga
- Sarah Nyendwoha Ntiro
- Josephine Nambooze
