= William Wilberforce Kalema =

- Kalema
- Born: June 1926; Mulagi Village, Kiboga District, Uganda
- Disappeared: 20th January 1972
- Citizenship: Uganda
- Education: Kings College Budo and Makerere University
- Occupations: Teacher, economist, civil servant, parliamentarian
- Employer(s): Kings College Budo, Government of Uganda
- Spouse: Rhoda Kalema
- Children: 6

William Wilberforce Kalema (born 1926), was a prominent post-independence Ugandan politician and cabinet minister. He was also a former teacher at King's College Budo. Furthermore, he served as Minister of Works, Minister of Communications, and later Minister of Commerce and Industry in President Milton Obote's first government. He is remembered for his dedication to Uganda's development.

== Early life and education ==
William Wilberforce Kalema was born in June 1926 in Mulagi Village, Kiboga District, Uganda. He attended King's College Budo, where he later returned as a teacher after graduating from Makerere University College with a teaching qualification. In 1953, he received a scholarship to pursue a master's degree in economics at the University of Edinburgh in Scotland.

== Political career ==
Upon returning to Uganda, Kalema served as Permanent Secretary in the Buganda Ministry of Education and later as Buganda election boundary commissioner. Further still, he was elected as one of Buganda's 21 representatives to the National Assembly under the Kabaka Yekka (KY) party. Following the coalition between Kabaka Yekka and the Uganda People's Congress (UPC), Kalema joined the national government where he served as Parliamentary Secretary in the Ministry of Education before becoming Minister of Works, Communications and Housing, and later Minister of Commerce and Industry in President Milton Obote's first administration.

Beyond Cabinet, Kalema played a role in Uganda's institutional development. He served on the three-man commission that transformed the East African High Commission into the East African Common Services Organization, chaired the Makerere University Council (1964–1966), and contributed to national policy on marriage registration and regional cooperation. He was widely regarded as one of the capable professionals who helped lay the foundations of Uganda's post-independence public service.

In January 1971, Kalema travelled with the then President Milton Obote to the Commonwealth Heads of Government Meeting (CHOGM) in Singapore. However, Idi Amin seized power in a military coup while the delegation was abroad. He returned to Uganda in February 1971, despite growing political uncertainty.

== Disappearance and death ==
On the evening of 20 January 1972, William Wilberforce Kalema left his home in Nakasero Road and did not return. Despite extensive efforts to locate him, he was never seen again. It is believed that he was abducted and killed by agents of the Idi Amin regime, although his body was never recovered.

== Family ==
Kalema married Rhoda Nakibuuka Nsibirwa on 11 February 1950. Rhoda was the daughter of former Buganda Katikkiro Martin Luther Nsibirwa and later became a distinguished politician, women's rights advocate, Constituent Assembly member, and author.

Together they had six children, including William S. Kalema and Gladys Kalema-Zikusoka

Following William Kalema's disappearance, Rhoda raised the family as a single mother under difficult political and economic circumstances. Gladys Kalema-Zikusoka, one of their daughter often speaks about how her father's disappearance shaped her life and inspired her commitment to conservation and public service.

== Legacy ==
William Wilberforce Kalema is remembered in Uganda as one of the pioneering post-independence leaders. As a teacher, economist, civil servant, parliamentarian, and cabinet minister, he helped shape Uganda's education system, regional institutions, and public administration during the country's formative years.

His legacy continues through the public service of his family and through national recognition of his contributions. In 2026, residents of Kiboga district unveiled a road plaque in his honor during commemorations celebrating the contributions of both William and Rhoda Kalema to Uganda's development.
