= Imran Kombe =

Tanzanian military and intelligence officer

Director of the Tanzania Intelligence and Security Service
- In office 1983–1995
- Preceded by: Augustine Mahiga
- Succeeded by: Apson Mwang'onda

Tanzania People's Defence Force Chief of Staff
- In office 1980–1983
- Preceded by: Tumainiel Kiwelu
- Succeeded by: Martin Mwakalindile

Personal details
- Died: 30 June 1996 Maili Sita, Moshi District, Tanzania

Military service
- Allegiance: Tanzania
- Branch/service: Tanzania People's Defence Force
- Rank: Lieutenant general
- Commands: 201st Brigade (1979)
- Battles/wars: Uganda–Tanzania War; Battle of Lukaya; Battle of Bombo; Battle of Lira

Imran Hussein Kombe (died 30 June 1996) was a Tanzanian military and intelligence officer. During the Uganda–Tanzania War of 1979, he commanded the Tanzania People's Defence Force's 201st Brigade as it invaded Uganda. From 1980 until 1983, he served as TPDF Chief of Staff, before being made Director of the Tanzania Intelligence and Security Service. He held the latter post until 1995. He was shot and killed by police the following year after they mistook him for a car thief.

== Career ==
=== Uganda–Tanzania War ===
In 1979, Kombe held the rank of brigadier in the Tanzania People's Defence Force (TPDF). During the Uganda–Tanzania War, he commanded the 201st Brigade as the TPDF invaded Uganda. In March 1979, the TPDF decided to attack the town of Lukaya, Uganda, where the only road from Masaka to Kampala passed through. The TPDF's 207th Brigade was dispatched through the swamp to the east. The 208th Brigade was sent west to conduct a wide sweep that would bring it around the northern end of the swamp, and Kombe's 201st Brigade was to advance up the road directly into the town. The 201st consisted almost entirely of militiamen, many of whom had not seen combat. However, the unit was bolstered by a battalion of Ugandan rebels. On 10 March, the brigade seized the town without incident. Later that day, a Ugandan-Libyan force advanced to the outskirts of the town and encountered the Tanzanians. The Libyans bombarded the locale with rockets, and the inexperienced militiamen broke and fled. Kombe and his subordinates tried to reassemble their brigade so it could continue fighting, but the soldiers were shaken and could not be organised. TPDF commanders altered their strategy and organised a counterattack, ordering the 208th Brigade to move around Lukaya to outflank the Ugandans and Libyans. The 208th Brigade reached its flanking position on 11 March and together with Kombe's brigade—by then organised—launched a new attack, successfully capturing the town.

On 10 April, as the TPDF advanced on Kampala, Kombe's brigade established roadblocks north of Kampala and intercepted both forces attempting to reinforce Kampala from the town of Bombo and those attempting to effect a breakout. Over the course of the day, they destroyed seven vehicles and killed 80 Ugandan soldiers. Once the city was captured, the 201st Brigade moved northward to secure the road and capture Bombo. Many retired Nubian officers of the Uganda Army resided in the area and made preparations for the defence of the town. Kombe had his forces deploy under the cover of night to surround the locale. The next morning the Tanzanians attacked and seized Bombo. After Bombo's capture, the 201st Brigade was tasked with securing Nakasongola Air Base. Aside from a brief encounter with a Ugandan tank on the road, the installation was seized without incident.

Kombe's forces and a smaller number of rebels of the Uganda National Liberation Front (UNLF) were then ordered to capture the important town of Lira in the north. Kombe realised that the most obvious way to approach Lira was from the west, along the main road which was located at Lake Kyoga's western side. The Uganda Army garrison was probably expecting that the Tanzanians would take this route. To surprise the Ugandan loyalists, Kombe consequently decided to instead cross Lake Kyoga by boat, then take the small roads through the nearby swamps, and attack Lira from the south. This plan had the additional benefit of preventing the 201st Brigade from running into other Tanzanian units, reducing the risk of possible intermingling and confusion. One major drawback to Kombe's idea was, however, that Lake Kyoga lacked ships large enough to transport all his men across, let alone tanks and artillery. With some help from locals, the 201st Brigade's scouts managed to find at least one small and old, but functional ferry at Namasale on Lake Kyoga's eastern side. The pilot initially refused to let the soldiers use his ship, which was owned by a Uganda Army officer. Kombe gave him food and cooking oil and assured him that he could keep the ferry once the war was over. He then agreed to help the Tanzanians and started to transport the 201st Brigade from Lwampanga (near Nakasongola) across the lake in twenty-hour shifts. After almost a week, the entire brigade was moved.

After crossing Lake Kyoga, the Tanzanian-UNLF force advanced toward Lira. At the same time, Kombe refined his plans. He wanted to secure a tangible victory at Lira, but knew that the Uganda Army had repeatedly put up only a token resistance at several locations, and then retreated. In order to prevent the Amin loyalists in the town from escaping, Kombe subsequently decided to split his force, and have one small unit set up an ambush west of Lira while the main force would frontally attack the town; if the Amin loyalists attempted to flee, they would run into the ambushing force, and be annihilated. He selected Lieutenant Colonel Roland Chacha's battalion of 600 Tanzanians, supported by 150 UNLF fighters, to set up the ambush. These troops would travel lightly, taking only small arms and a few light mortars with them. Though the scouts who were supposed to chart the path for Chacha's force failed to return, Kombe ordered the operation to begin by midafternoon on 14 May. Chacha's men moved out of the village of Agwata toward Lira, which lay 25 miles to the north. After nearly 20 hours of marching, the column reached the Gulu road at dawn, and took shelter in an adjacent orchard. Meanwhile, over the course of the night, one detachment of the 201st Brigade moved around to the eastern flank of Lira, cutting it off from Soroti, while another took up position north of the town to block access to Kitgum.

Kombe launched his attack later in the morning on 15 May with a 30-minute artillery bombardment of Lira, followed by an advance into the town. A significant part of the Uganda Army garrison started to retreat along the western road as expected. Upon hearing the artillery fire, Chacha's force began its advance down the road towards Lira. Some of the Amin loyalists who fled immediately after the beginning of Kombe's attack managed to escape the area. Chacha's force blocked the garrison's western retreat, killing over 70 Ugandan soldiers. In its final action of the war, the 201st Brigade subsequently, peacefully occupied Kitgum, which had been taken over by rebel militiamen, thus removing all towns east of the White Nile from Ugandan loyalist control. Kombe drove himself into the town with several buses of soldiers behind him. The 201st Brigade was therefore the second TPDF brigade to complete its allotted tasks for the conflict.

=== Post-war career ===
In 1980, Kombe became TPDF Chief of Staff. On 30 December, he was promoted to the rank of major general. The following year he led a Tanzanian military delegation to Hungary and met with Hungarian military officials. In 1983, Kombe left the army position and, with the rank of lieutenant general, became the Director of the Tanzania Intelligence and Security Service. He held the office until 1995. In his 2000 book, Genocide and Covert Operations in Africa 1993–1999, conspiracy theorist Wayne Madsen argued that in 1994 Kombe became aware of a plot to assassinate President Juvénal Habyarimana of Rwanda, President Daniel arap Moi of Kenya, and President Mobutu Sese Seko of Zaire as they attended a regional peace summit in Tanzania. According to Madsen, Kombe warned Moi, who in turn warned Mobutu, and the two of them subsequently refrained from going to the conference. Habyarimana was killed when his plane was shot down on 6 April 1994 after leaving the summit.

== Death ==
On 30 June 1996, the Dar es Salaam Regional Police Commissioner ordered two police officers to search for a vehicle stolen in Dar es Salaam. Joined by three more officers, they conducted a search near Moshi and Arusha. The police found a car with a similar license plate to the stolen vehicle in Maili Sita, Moshi District, Kilimanjaro Region, which was driven by Kombe and his wife, Rosseleen. The two were in the area looking to hire additional workers for their farm. The police shot out one of its tires, and Kombe exited the vehicle and reportedly raised his hands in surrender. The police officers—apparently mistaking him for a carjacker—opened fire, firing 19 rounds and striking Kombe with five shots, killing him.

As Kombe had been shot despite reportedly raising his hands in surrender, there was public speculation that his killing was a planned assassination. A commission was assembled to investigate the incident. It interviewed 52 witnesses and in 1997 delivered a report to President Benjamin Mkapa concluding that the government had no role in Kombe's death. In 1998, Tanzanian Member of Parliament Augustino Mrema declared that Kombe's death was part of an assassination scheme carried out by the government. The National Assembly voted down his accusations.

The five police officers involved in the killing were indicted on the charge of murder and pled not guilty. Two were convicted and sentenced to death in 1998. Following the conviction, Kombe's widow sued the Tanzanian government for damages. In 2001, a Tanzanian high court ruled that the police officers used excessive force while carrying out an official assignment, and ordered the government to pay compensation to Kombe's widow. In May 2011, President Jakaya Kikwete commuted the former police officers' sentences to two years imprisonment for manslaughter. As they had already been incarcerated for over 15 years, they were released.

== Works cited ==
- Avirgan, Tony; Honey, Martha (1983). War in Uganda: The Legacy of Idi Amin. Dar es Salaam: Tanzania Publishing House. ISBN 978-9976-1-0056-3.
- Cooper, Tom; Fontanellaz, Adrien (2015). Wars and Insurgencies of Uganda 1971–1994. Solihull: Helion & Company Limited. ISBN 978-1-910294-55-0.
- Mzirai, Baldwin (1980). Kuzama kwa Idi Amin (in Swahili). Dar es Salaam: Publicity International. OCLC 9084117.
