= Rebecca Mirembe Nyonyintono =

Ugandan educationist (born 1943)

- Born: 1943 (age 82–83); Katale, Wakiso District, Uganda
- Citizenship: Uganda
- Education: Makerere University; University at Buffalo
- Occupations: Educationist; Sociologist; Researcher; Child rights advocate
- Employers: Makerere University; Kenyatta University; Ndejje University
- Known for: Research and child rights advocacy

Rebecca Mirembe Nyonyintono (born 1943) is a Ugandan educationist, sociologist, researcher and child rights advocate.

== Early life and education background ==
Nyonyintono was born in 1943 to Besweri Nyonyintono and Catherine Nyonyintono at Katale, in Wakiso District, Uganda. She began her education at Jungo Primary School and later attended Buloba College Primary School in Mityana before joining Gayaza High School for her secondary education, where she served as deputy head girl and later head girl.

In 1965, Nyonyintono joined Makerere University, where she graduated with a Bachelor of Social Sciences degree in 1968. She later went to the United States for postgraduate studies at the State University of New York at Buffalo where she obtained a PhD in Sociology of Education and Social Psychology.

== Career ==
Nyonyintono began her teaching career at Makerere University in 1971 where she taught and conducted research in the social sciences. In 1972, during the regime of Idi Amin, she left Uganda to join Kenyatta University College, where she worked as a lecturer in the Department of Educational Foundations from June 1972 to August 1979.

From July 1984 to June 1987, she worked as a sociologist in the Maternal and Child Health Unit of the African Medical and Research Foundation (AMREF) in Nairobi. After leaving AMREF, Nyonyintono worked as a consultant in Kenya, Uganda and Tanzania and her consultancy work involved research and social development.

In 1998, she returned to Makerere University and became a senior lecturer in the Department of Sociology. She continued teaching and conducting research at the university until 2005. In 2006, Nyonyintono joined Ndejje University as Research Coordinator in the School of Postgraduate Studies. She served in the position until 2012, working on research development and postgraduate research activities.

In 2012, she became Director of Research and Innovations at Ndejje University before serving as Director of Research and Innovations until March 2020, when she retired from the university. In addition, She served as president of ANPPCAN an organisation working to prevent child abuse and strengthen child protection across Africa.

== Publications ==
In 2010, Nyonyintono published Conceptualising the Research Problem: A Step-by-Step Guide, a book aimed at helping students and researchers understand how to identify and develop research problems.

== See also ==
- Sarah Nyendwoha Ntiro
- Joyce Mpanga
- Gladys Nsibirwa Wambuzi
- Katherine Namuddu
