= Fall of Kampala =

Battle in the Uganda–Tanzania War, April 1979

- Part of the Uganda–Tanzania War
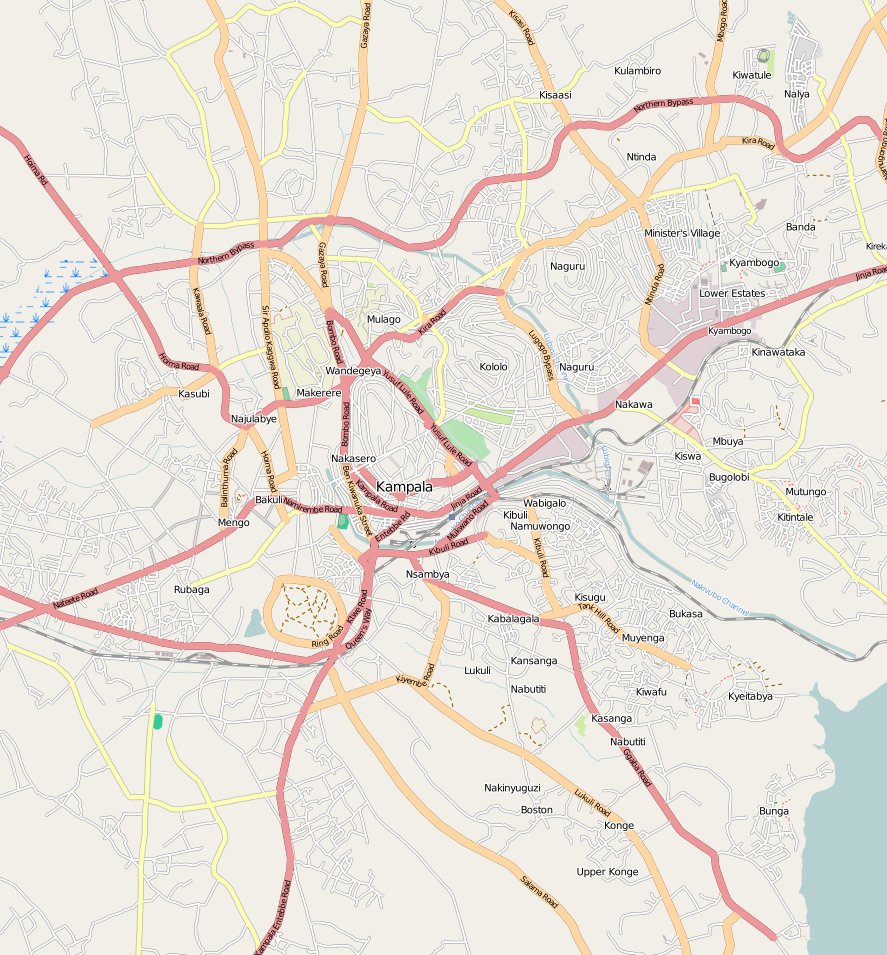
- Map of Kampala
Date	10–11 April 1979
Location	Kampala, Uganda
Result	Tanzanian–UNLF victory
Territorial changes	Kampala occupied by Tanzanian and UNLF forces

Belligerents
Uganda; Libya; Palestine Liberation Organisation	Tanzania; Uganda National Liberation Front

Commanders and leaders
(Second Republic of Uganda) Idi Amin (Second Republic of Uganda) Dusman Sabuni (Second Republic of Uganda) Juma Butabika † (Palestine) Mahmoud Da'as	(Tanzania) Mwita Marwa (Tanzania) John Butler Walden (Tanzania) Ben Msuya; David Oyite-Ojok

Units involved
Chui Battalion; Uganda Army Air Force; Fatah	205th Brigade; 207th Brigade; 208th Brigade

Strength
c. 1,000 soldiers	3 Tanzanian brigades 1 UNLF battalion

Casualties and losses
Dozens of Ugandan soldiers killed 500+ Ugandan soldiers captured Light Libyan casualties	Light Tanzanian casualties 6+ UNLF soldiers killed
- Several dozen civilians may have been killed

The Fall of Kampala, also known as the Liberation of Kampala (Swahili: Kukombolewa kwa Kampala), was a battle during the Uganda–Tanzania War in 1979, in which the combined forces of Tanzania and the Uganda National Liberation Front (UNLF) attacked and captured the Ugandan capital, Kampala. As a result, Ugandan President Idi Amin was deposed, his forces were scattered, and a UNLF government was installed.

Amin had seized power in Uganda in 1971 and established a brutal dictatorship. Seven years later he attempted to invade Tanzania to the south. Tanzania repulsed the assault and launched a counter-attack into Ugandan territory. After routing the Ugandans and their Libyan allies in Entebbe, the Tanzanians revised their existing offensive designs for Kampala. The plans called for the 208th Brigade to advance from the south, spearheaded by Lieutenant Colonel Ben Msuya's 800-strong 19th Battalion, which was to secure the centre of the city. The 207th Brigade and a UNLF battalion were to attack from the west, while the 201st Brigade was to establish roadblocks to the north to prevent Ugandan units from withdrawing. An eastern corridor was left open to allow the Libyans to evacuate to Jinja and fly out of the country. Amin prepared for the defence of Kampala but fled through the gap.

The Tanzanians began their assault on the city on the morning of 10 April. The 19th Battalion moved cautiously down the Entebbe–Kampala road. Other battalions of the 208th advanced on Port Bell. The 201st Brigade established its roadblocks north of Kampala and intercepted the forces attempting to reinforce Kampala from Bombo and those attempting to break out of Kampala. The 207th Brigade advanced from the west in tandem with the UNLF battalion, which secured Nateete and passed through Rubaga. One of the 207th's battalions seized Kasubi hill and the royal tomb of the Kabakas. The 19th Battalion encountered only sporadic resistance and was greeted by crowds of rejoicing civilians. Upon reaching Kampala's city centre, the unit, lacking maps, had trouble navigating the streets. The Tanzanians secured the radio station and set up a command post on Kololo hill. The UNLF battalion occupied Republic House—the Uganda Army's headquarters at the edge of the city—unopposed, but was unable to take the State Research Bureau at Nakasero. Men of the 207th and 208th Brigades seized the southern and western portions of the city. The few Libyan units in the area put up little resistance, most having retreated to Jinja.

By dawn on April 11, Tanzanian troops had cut off all routes out of Kampala, including the road to Jinja, and began eliminating remaining pockets of resistance. Some UNLF forces conducted revenge killings against suspected collaborators with the Amin regime, while others attacked Kakwa and Nubians, both ethnic groups that had benefited from the dictatorship. Later in the morning Tanzanian artillery bombarded parts of the city. The remaining Ugandan soldiers in the city desperately attempted to escape by changing into civilian clothes and requisitioning civilian vehicles. Casualty statistics are not exact, though Tanzanian losses are estimated to have been light, and dozens of Ugandan soldiers and civilians are believed to have died. The battle marked the first time in the recent history of the continent that an African state seized the capital of another African country and deposed its government. In the immediate aftermath, civilians engaged in rampant looting, despite the attempts of Tanzanian and UNLF troops to maintain order. A new Ugandan government was established by the UNLF. Though pro-Amin forces were left scattered and disjointed by the seizure of the capital, combat operations in the country continued until 3 June, when Tanzanian forces reached the Sudanese border and eliminated the last resistance.

== Background ==
In 1971, Idi Amin launched a military coup that overthrew the President of Uganda, Milton Obote, precipitating a deterioration of relations with neighbouring Tanzania. Tanzanian President Julius Nyerere had close ties with Obote and had supported his socialist orientation. Amin installed himself as President of Uganda and ruled the country under a repressive dictatorship. Nyerere withheld diplomatic recognition of the new government and offered asylum to Obote and his supporters. He tacticly supported a failed attempt by Obote to overthrow Amin in 1972, and after a brief border conflict he and Amin signed a peace accord. Nevertheless, relations between the two presidents remained tense, and Amin made repeated threats to invade Tanzania.

Uganda's economy languished under Amin's corrupt rule and instability manifested in the armed forces. Following a failed mutiny in late October 1978, Ugandan troops crossed the Tanzanian border in pursuit of rebellious soldiers. On 1 November Amin announced that he was annexing the Kagera Salient in northern Tanzania. Tanzania halted the sudden invasion, mobilised anti-Amin opposition groups, and launched a counter-offensive. Nyerere told foreign diplomats that he did not intend to depose Amin, but only "teach him a lesson". The claim was not believed; Nyerere despised Amin, and he made statements to some of his colleagues about overthrowing him. The Tanzanian government also felt that its northern border would not be secure unless the threat presented by Amin was eliminated. After initial advances into Ugandan territory, Major General David Msuguri was appointed commander of the Tanzania People's Defence Force (TPDF)'s 20th Division and ordered to push further into the country.

The TPDF seized Masaka on 24 February 1979. Nyerere originally planned to halt his forces there and allow Ugandan exiles to attack Kampala, the Ugandan capital, and overthrow Amin. (Note: According to historian Kenneth Ingham, Nyerere requested Obote, who was in exile in Tanzania, to fly to Masaka to accompany the Ugandan partisans as they entered the city, but Obote refused, fearing that such a dramatic return to the country would incite hostility against him.) He feared that scenes of Tanzanian troops occupying the city would reflect poorly on the country's image abroad. The fall of Masaka surprised and deeply troubled Ugandan commanders, who felt that the defeat made Kampala vulnerable to attack. They mobilised additional forces and began planning for a defence of the city. Some troops were sent to Lukaya, where they vainly attempted to halt the Tanzanian advance.

Ugandan opposition groups met in Moshi in late March. They elected Yusuf Lule chairman of the Uganda National Liberation Front (UNLF) and established a cabinet. Shortly thereafter President Muammar Gaddafi of Libya, an ally of Amin, attempted to stem the advance by sending an ultimatum to Nyerere, demanding that he withdraw his forces in 24 hours or face the opposition of Libyan troops (which were already operating in Uganda). Nyerere rejected the threat in a radio broadcast, announcing that Libya's entry into the war did not change the Tanzanian government's view of Amin. Ugandan rebel forces did not have the strength to defeat Libyan units, so Nyerere decided to use the TPDF to take Kampala. Tanzanian leaders were also inclined to capture the city after Ugandan planes bombed Kagera and following Amin's announcement that the inhabitants of Masaka and Mbarara would face retaliation for welcoming the Tanzanian invasion. The successful formation of the UNLF government eased Tanzanian concerns about the aftermath of a seizure of the capital. On 25 March Amin imposed a curfew and a blackout in Kampala, which was home to 400,000 residents. Four days later the United Nations announced that it would evacuate the approximately 140 dependents of its Kampala staff to Kenya. On 31 March the Tanzanians drew up their plans of attack. Despite the imminence of the TPDF offensive, the leadership of the Save Uganda Movement (SUM) –a rebel group with active guerrillas in Ugandan cities– ordered its cells in Kampala to fall back to Kenya at this point, much to the SUM guerrillas' confusion and frustration.

== Prelude ==
In early April Tanzanian forces began to concentrate their efforts on weakening the Ugandan position in Kampala. Jets conducted several sorties against military targets in the city. Tanzanian commanders had originally assumed that Amin would station the bulk of his forces in the capital, and their initial plans called for a direct attack on the city. However, from the high ground in Mpigi they could see the Entebbe peninsula, where there was heavy Libyan air traffic and a large contingent of Ugandan and Libyan soldiers. If the TPDF seized Kampala before securing the town of Entebbe, it would be susceptible to a flanking attack. Taking Entebbe would cut off Uganda's Libyan reinforcements and permit an assault on the capital from the south. Msuguri made the decision to attack the peninsula first, and ordered the 208th Brigade to secure it. A preliminary bombardment frightened Amin in his official residence, the Entebbe State House, and he fled via helicopter to Kampala. On 7 April the brigade advanced into the town. Many Libyan soldiers attempted to evacuate to Kampala but were intercepted and killed. Following the seizure of Entebbe, hundreds of Ugandan soldiers garrisoning Kampala fled, many of them relocating with their moveable possessions to the country's north. While these troops attempted to flee the capital, one unit relocated from Bombo to Kampala to help defend Amin's government. It mostly consisted of members of West Nile tribes who were still loyal due to the patronage which they had received from the President. The remnants of the Libyan force joined the remaining Ugandan troops and took up positions around the capital. The morale of the Libyans and Uganda Army troops was extremely low despite Amin's public claims to the contrary.

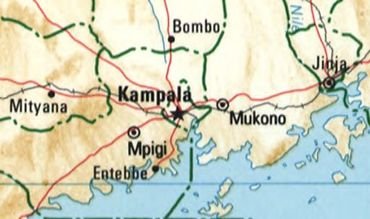
Map of Kampala and its surroundings

On the morning of 8 April, Tanzanian officers held a final meeting in the Entebbe State House before the attack on Kampala. Brigadier Mwita Marwa, commander of the 208th Brigade, conducted the briefing. Nyerere requested that his commanders leave the eastern road from the city leading to Jinja clear so that Libyan troops and foreign diplomats could evacuate. He thought that by letting the Libyans escape, Libya could avoid humiliation and quietly withdraw from the war. Nyerere also feared that further conflict with Libyan troops would incite Afro–Arab tensions and invite the armed belligerence of other Arab states. He sent a message to Gaddafi explaining his decision, saying that the Libyans could be airlifted out of Uganda unopposed from the airstrip in Jinja. He further requested that his forces avoid damaging key buildings in Kampala, including Mulago Hospital, Makerere University, and the Parliament of Uganda. The Tanzanian plan of attack called for an advance by the 207th Brigade and a UNLF battalion from the west along the road from Masaka with a simultaneous assault from Entebbe in the south by the 208th Brigade. The latter's 19th Battalion under Lieutenant Colonel Ben Msuya was earmarked for the seizure of the city centre, while other units were to cover their flanks in the bush. The 201st Brigade was to maintain a "blocking action" north of Kampala to prevent Ugandan forces from escaping. The entire operation was supposed to take three days to complete.

Amin made final preparations for the defence of the capital, and General Dusman Sabuni was left in charge of the defences. According to the Africa Research Bulletin, there were approximately 1,000 soldiers garrisoning the city, while journalist John Darnton reported on 9 April an estimate that Amin had 2,000 to 3,000 men just south of the capital as "a last line of defence". The Kampala garrison included members of the Chui Battalion, personnel of the Ugandan Air Force, and a few tanks. In addition to Ugandan and Libyan soldiers, a small number of allied Palestine Liberation Organisation (PLO) militants belonging to Fatah took up positions in the outskirts of Kampala. These Palestinians were commanded by Mahmoud Da'as and reportedly ready to fight. Regardless, they also prepared possible evacuation routes. (Note: According to journalist Martha Honey, Amin's "about 50 Palestinian bodyguards" began leaving Uganda on 4 April.) Many civilians fled in anticipation of a battle, though Minister of Commerce Muhammad Bakhit declared that they had to return within two days or have their property "reallocated". Most of the students at Makerere University went to their family homes outside the city. Kampala District Commissioner Wahib Muhammed claimed that a week before the Tanzanian attack Amin ordered all soldiers in the Kampala garrison to evacuate their families, and that most of the army subsequently withdrew "with a lot of discipline". On 8 April the Soviet Union's diplomats evacuated to Kenya in a convoy, accompanied by the personnel of other Eastern bloc legations.

The 800-strong 19th Battalion entrenched itself on a hill 21 kilometres away from Kampala overlooking the road from Entebbe. Throughout the night of 8 April the battalion command post faced harassing fire from a tank. Ugandan reconnaissance patrols engaged in sporadic fighting with Tanzanian defences while artillery bombarded Kampala's suburbs. At 03:30 on 9 April the 19th Battalion descended from its position. Shortly afterwards, Tanzanian artillery began a 15-minute bombardment of Ugandan positions around Kampala. The battalion reassembled on the Entebbe–Kampala road and began its advance. Two companies advanced parallel through the bush on both sides of the road to screen for ambushes. The rest of the battalion split into companies that walked on the dirt shoulders of the road, the units staggered on alternating sides. They occasionally paused to ensure the advance units stayed ahead. At 09:00, having covered the distance necessitated by the battle plan, the battalion re-encamped itself around a residence along the side of the road. The 207th Brigade occupied Mutundwe.

== Battle ==
=== 10 April ===
On the morning of 10 April TPDF reconnaissance forces reported that the Ugandan defences around Kampala were weak. Though most units were not yet in position, Tanzanian forces were ordered to seize the capital. The 19th Battalion vacated its position and assembled on the Entebbe–Kampala road. Other battalions of the 208th secured Cape Town View (Amin's villa on Lake Victoria) and advanced on Port Bell. The 201st Brigade led by Brigadier Imran Kombe established roadblocks north of Kampala and intercepted both forces attempting to reinforce Kampala from Bombo and those attempting to effect a breakout. Over the course of the day they destroyed seven vehicles and killed 80 Ugandan soldiers. The 207th Brigade under Brigadier John Walden advanced from the west in tandem with a UNLF battalion under Lieutenant Colonel David Oyite-Ojok. Ojok's men secured Nateete and passed through Rubaga. One of the 207th's battalions seized Kasubi hill and the royal tomb of the Kabakas, the kings of Buganda. The PLO fighters later claimed to have fought "valiantly" in the outskirts of Kampala, but retreated upon realising that their Ugandan allies were no longer willing to fight on. Da'as and his men consequently withdrew northwards, and eventually crossed into Sudan.

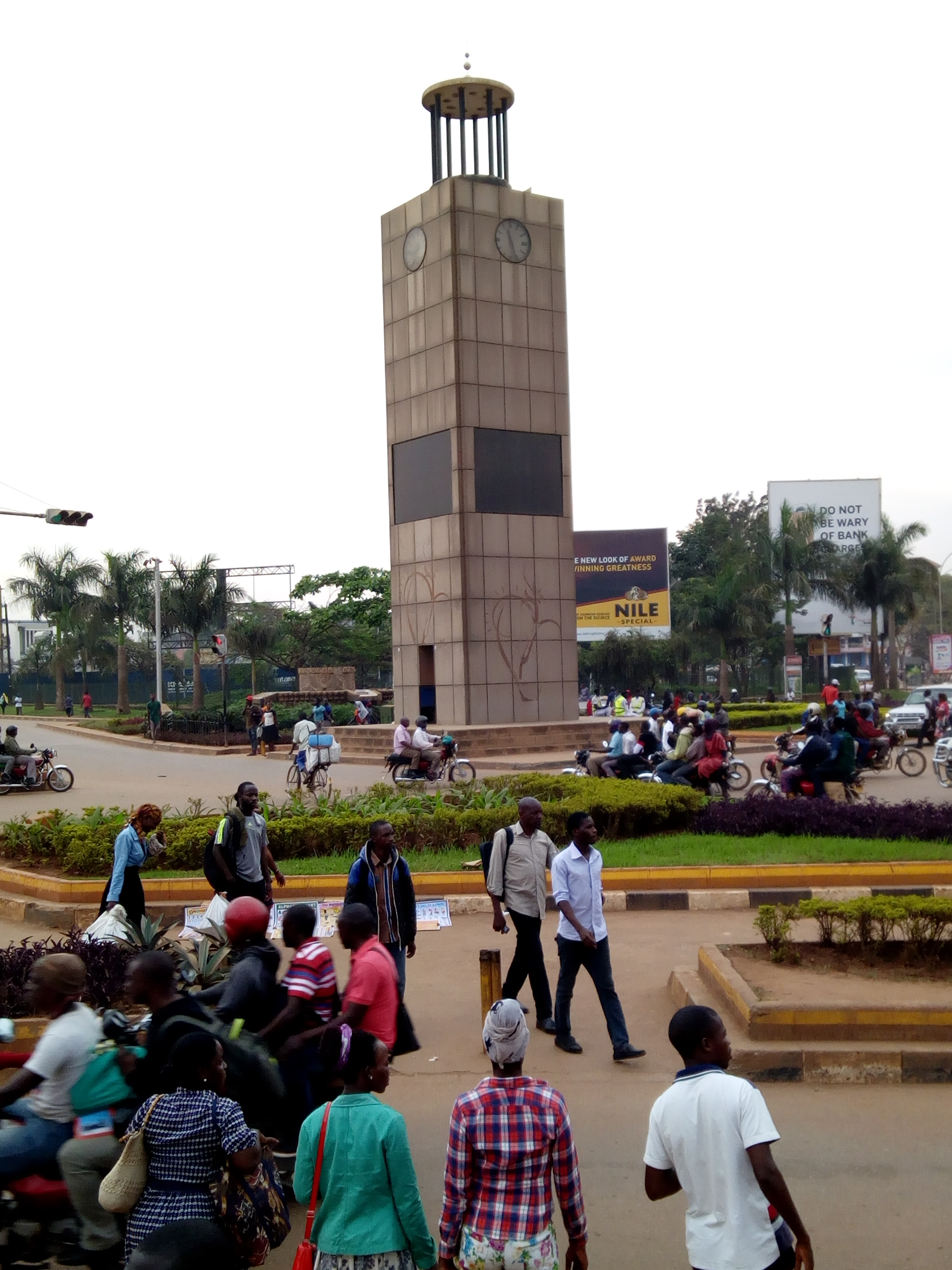
The clock tower by the Entebbe road in 2017

The 19th Battalion began its advance at 03:36, accompanied by freelance journalists Tony Avirgan and Martha Honey. The TPDF initiated a heavy 90-minute-long artillery bombardment of the Kampala at dawn, and another barrage later in the morning. Windows were shattered by the explosions, and several buildings and roads were struck. Only a few civilian casualties were reported, as most of the city's residents left the streets and sought shelter indoors. As the 19th Battalion moved down the Entebbe–Kampala road with its three tanks (a T-59 and two T-62s), it was joined by an increasing number of celebratory civilians, eager for the removal of the Amin regime. The column did not encounter resistance until it came under small-arms fire near the Makindye roundabout from a marketplace by the left side of the road, about two kilometres from the centre of the city. The Tanzanian troops took cover in a drainage ditch and returned fire while the civilians scattered. Fire was exchanged for 10 minutes until the source of the opposition, a limousine occupied by five Ugandan soldiers armed with semi-automatic weapons, emerged from cover and drove towards the Tanzanian column. It was quickly destroyed with small-arms fire, a rocket-propelled grenade, and a 75 mm tank shell. The Tanzanians searched the market but found no more Ugandans, and subsequently resumed their march into the capital, joined by the cheering civilians. The battalion received some harassing fire but took no casualties and at 17:00 reached the clock tower in Kampala where the Entebbe road entered the downtown.

Msuya was eager to complete his battalion's objectives in the two hours remaining before nightfall. His decisions were complicated by the fact that he had no map of Kampala and had to rely upon a Ugandan guide for directions. He resolved to secure the radio station first. Leaving a guard behind to prevent the civilians from following, the battalion moved out into in city streets, but with only the guide's confused and limited directions, its progress was slow. The Bank of Uganda, Post Office, Parliament, and the Nile Mansion Hotel were secured with only minimal resistance. The Tanzanians faced stiffer opposition at the Ministry of Internal Affairs building. Most of the Ugandan leadership had fled, leaving their defences confused and uncoordinated. Aside from a brief firefight with Ugandan soldiers positioned in a balcony, the 19th Battalion located the Radio Uganda station without incident. Though its equipment was intact, Msuya was under orders not to make any broadcasts (he told a junior officer, "This is almost worth getting court-martialled for.").

The Tanzanians repulsed a brief ambush from an adjacent skyscraper before considering their next move. They were supposed to secure Nakasero hill, the location of the State Research Bureau (Amin's secret police organisation) and the presidential residence, and Kololo hill, home to Amin's personal "Command Post", before nightfall. Msuya determined that only one area could be seized in the time frame, and of the two choices Kololo presented a safer location for an overnight encampment. Meanwhile, the UNLF battalion occupied Republic House, the Uganda Army's headquarters at the edge of the city. They were unopposed, but five men were killed by friendly fire when Tanzanian artillery bombarded the site, the gunners unaware that it had been taken. (Note: Save Uganda Movement (SUM) member Paul Oryema Opobo later claimed that one SUM rebel, John Okumu Samora, was killed during an mortar attack by Amin loyalists on Mengo Hill where the Republic House is located.) At around nightfall the UNLF force approached the State Research Bureau at Nakasero in the belief that it had been abandoned. When the unit was close, Ugandan soldiers opened fire, destroying a Land Rover and forcing the UNLF to retreat. The Ugandans later abandoned the Bureau, but threw grenades into the holding cells in an attempt to kill the last prisoners.

"Scores of dead bodies were scattered all over its fairways and greens. I saw not only several corpses of Ugandan soldiers in uniforms, but also a number of civilians who had been mowed down indiscriminately."

— Indian diplomat Madanjeet Singh's description of the golf course on 11 April 1979

While the bulk of the 19th Battalion set out for Kololo, a detached company set up an ambush position in a park overlooking a street that led towards the Jinja road. The Tanzanians attacked two passing Ugandan Land Rovers, killing their three occupants. In one of the vehicles the soldiers recovered a detailed plan for Kampala's defence which specified the battalions and commanders responsible for each sector; most had already dispersed. By nightfall the 19th Battalion had not located the Command Post. Kampala was quiet and there was no electricity in the entire city, with the exception of a single traffic light. Eventually the Ugandan guide directed the unit to a golf course which the troops cut across to the base of Kololo. By 21:00 the Tanzanians were following residential streets up the hill. Frustrated by his guide's inability to locate the Command Post, Msuya decided to forgo the location and establish his own command post in an abandoned home whilst his battalion dug trenches and established roadblocks. According to him, by 22:00 Kampala was under Tanzanian control. At 23:00 he held a toast with his officers to celebrate the capture of the city.

Overnight several other battalions of the 208th moved into the southern portion of Kampala, while the 207th occupied the west. Brigadier Walden oversaw the capture of Amin's residence. The few Libyan units in the city put up little resistance. Most retreated to Jinja and then to Ethiopia and Kenya to await repatriation. Amin also fled to Jinja, though how and precisely when are not agreed upon. (Note: According to Roberts, Amin left before the battle. Strasser, Gibson, and Moreau stated that he moved around in suburban houses until the day before the battle, when he drove to Jinja. According to several Ugandan soldiers, he fled in a helicopter on 10 April. Amin's son, Jaffar Remo, stated that his father was in the northeastern suburb of Munyonyo on 11 April, prepared "to die in battle", but that some of his senior officers forced him into a car and drove him to Jinja. Researcher Muwonge Magembe stated that Amin left Munyonyo willingly after agreeing with his officers to go into exile.) The UNLF battalion established its camp in the golf course. As the troops were settling down a small white car drove by and an occupant opened fire, mortally wounding an officer. The UNLF subsequently erected roadblocks around the location. The men maintaining them grew drunk throughout the night on pillaged beer and whisky.

=== 11 April ===
By dawn of 11 April Tanzanian troops had cut off all routes leaving Kampala, including the road to Jinja, and began eliminating the remaining pockets of resistance. Some UNLF forces conducted revenge killings against suspected collaborators with the Amin regime, while others attacked Kakwa and Nubians, both ethnic groups that had benefited from the dictatorship. At 04:00 the East German ambassador, Gottfried Lessing, and his wife left their residence in a small white car with another vehicle following in an attempt to escape the city. When they drove by the golf course the UNLF fired two rocket-propelled grenades, destroying the cars and killing the four occupants. (Note: The Tanzanians initially claimed that one of the occupants was Bob Astles, a close associate of Amin.) As the morning progressed, the UNLF soldiers manning the roadblocks drunkenly harassed passing civilians and Tanzanian soldiers.

Ojok proceeded to Radio Uganda to announce the fall of Amin's regime. According to Honey and Avirgan, Ojok had long desired to inform the Ugandan people that they were free of the dictatorship, but Lule had sent a message to the UNLF forces, prohibiting Ojok from making any broadcasts. Lule feared that Ojok would declare the restoration of Obote's presidential regime (Ojok and Obote had been long-time allies in the resistance against Amin). Honey and Avirgan stated that upon reaching the station Ojok placed two phone calls to Dar es Salaam. The first was to Nyerere, who was not present, though a message was recorded by a security officer. The second was to Obote. Ojok reportedly told Obote that he intended to announce the capture of Kampala in the name of the UNLF, to which Obote expressed his approval. According to historian Kenneth Ingham, Ojok asked Obote for direction on what to say, and he was instructed to appeal for support of a new national government without mentioning Obote or his party, the Uganda People's Congress. Obote claimed that immediately after the phone call he telephoned Nyerere to inform him of the fall of Kampala, and Nyerere came to his residence to celebrate the occasion. Msuya asserted that Ojok had initially refused to make any declaration, saying "If our friends in Moshi and Dar es Salaam hear me reading this, they will think I have taken over." Msuya told the Daily Monitor, "I literally held a gun on Oyite-Ojok's head to read the communiqué...I told him someone has got to say something and that person has got to be a Ugandan." Despite the persistence of gunfire, several technicians arrived for their scheduled workday and assisted Ojok in making the broadcast. His declaration was straightforward; he stated that Amin's government was deposed and that Kampala was under the control of the UNLF, and appealed to residents to remain calm and for Ugandan soldiers to surrender. Lule was infuriated by the broadcast and a prerecorded speech by him was not played on Radio Uganda until later that evening.

"For six years Ugandans had seen their city taken over by a tiny fraction of the population. While the rest of the population lacked nearly every conceivable essential commodity, the shops, homes and stores of Amin's henchmen...were filled with goods. The looting and smashing of these shops was a symbolic expression of revenge by a people who had been terrorized for nearly eight years."

— Semakula Kiwanuka's psychological explanation for the wave of looting as Kampala fell

Later in the morning Tanzanian artillery bombarded parts of the city. Most Ugandan soldiers quickly broke and fled upon being subjected to shelling. More civilians, seeing that the troops on their streets were Tanzanian, came out from their dwellings to celebrate and loot. Some pointed out remaining pockets of resistance to the TPDF. Meanwhile, the diplomatic staff resident on Kololo hill felt it was safe enough to begin visiting Msuya's command post to pay their respects to him. Civilians raided the files of the State Research Bureau in search of records that contained the whereabouts of missing family members. The Tanzanians found among the documents a copy of their top-secret plan of attack for Kampala. Lieutenant Colonel Salim Hassan Boma led a detachment on a sweep of the capital, and on the edge of the city they discovered Luzira Prison, where over 1,700 prisoners were held; Boma ordered them all to be set free.

The remaining Ugandan soldiers in the city desperately attempted to escape by changing into civilian clothes and requisitioning civilian vehicles. They robbed residents at gunpoint and in some cases murdered them to secure the items. As Tanzanian patrols secured Kampala's neighbourhoods, some of them stumbled across the Ugandan soldiers and exchanged fire with them. Three of the latter attempted to rob the residence of the First Secretary of the French Embassy, but were driven away by gunfire from the secretary's wife. Withdrawing troops also looted properties on Mulago hill. At least 10 Ugandan soldiers were beaten to death by enraged civilians armed with furniture and pieces of wood. Lieutenant Colonel Juma Butabika, one of Amin's top commanders, was killed in a firefight with soldiers of the 205th and 208th Brigades in the Bwaise–Kawempe area as they moved in from Mityana to secure the northern section of the city. (Note: Mzirai wrote that Butabika was killed at a roadblock on the Bombo road three days before Kampala was captured.) Lieutenant Colonel Abdul Kisule, the commander of an artillery unit based in Masindi, surrendered in the capital, as did the Uganda Army's chief medical officer, Brigadier G. D. Bogere.

Meanwhile, Kampala's residents engaged in rampant looting, despite the attempts of Tanzanian and UNLF troops to maintain order. A few looters were active in the morning and only targeted the homes of Amin's lieutenants but, by the afternoon, many were crowding the streets and pillaging property indiscriminately. Stores had their windows smashed and were cleared of furniture, documents were destroyed, and new cars were pushed out of show rooms and onto the streets. Some buildings were set on fire. The Ministry of Health's offices were raided by its own employees. In what most observers described as the boldest incident of looting in the entire war, the six-foot-thick door to the vault of the Barclays Bank of Uganda main branch building was breached with plastic explosives and 2.25 million shillings were stolen. Msuya felt that the only way to stop the pillaging would be to open fire on the crowds, which would generate a highly negative response from the population. Instead, he ordered his men to quietly assist the looters in breaking into government warehouses and try to keep the situation calm. This strategy failed, as two civilians were accidentally killed in the pandemonium. Eventually the Tanzanians were authorised to seize a radio and a watch each from abandoned homes. (Note: In contrast to other accounts, Ugandan businessman Gordon Wavamunno, citing friends who lived in Kampala, stated that the pillaging was led by the Tanzanians and the UNLF and that "most of the looted property was in fact loaded on looted trucks and dispatched to Tanzania." The Associated Press reported that "victorious soldiers helped Kampala residents loot shops and state warehouses" on 15 April. According to Edward Khiddu-Makubuya, the directions given to the police and soldiers on how to handle the looting "have never been made clear.") According to a Newsweek report, the evening of 11 April "came to be called the 'Night of the Wheel-barrows,'" in allusion to civilians carting away property. (Note: Neuroscientist Robert Sapolsky, who was in Kampala at the time, wrote, "There was a vague tone in the Western press of 'those people running amok once again, destroying their own communities.' It was anything but that...Amin had been a general from the northern [Nubian] tribe, and when he took over, he systematically seized the stores of Kampala and turned them over to his tribal compatriots. Thus, the orgy of looting and revenge against the northerners.")

== Aftermath ==
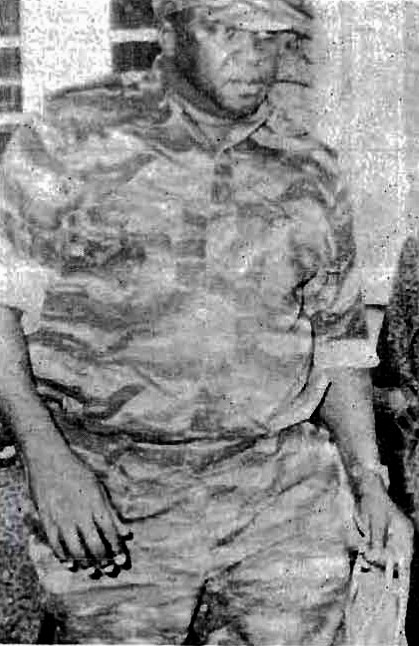
Idi Amin (pictured) denied, over radio, that Kampala had fallen to the Tanzanians and UNLF.

On 11 April, following the reception of news of the fall of Kampala, Sudanese guards were placed on alert at the Ugandan frontier. Shortly thereafter Ugandan refugees began steadily fleeing over the border. On 12 April, Amin delivered a rambling radio broadcast via a mobile transmitter in which he denounced Ojok's speech and declared that his forces still held Kampala. He then boarded an aircraft in Arua and flew to Libya. He eventually settled in exile in Saudi Arabia and never returned to Uganda. The next day, a band of lingering Ugandan soldiers in Kampala shot a Tanzanian sentry in front of the Bank of Uganda. Tanzanian sappers promptly razed the building the group was hiding in. Looting decreased over the following days, but random shootings occurred throughout the city. A small number of Ugandan and Libyan troops remained in hiding, and on 15 April three Libyans were killed while attempting to steal a car. In the days following the city's capture Tanzanian soldiers maintained roadblocks and checkpoints.

Kampala was left damaged by the Tanzanian artillery bombardment and the looting. Electricity and water services were restored to a portion of the population a few days after the battle. In early May civilians and municipal officials cleaned up most of the debris and boarded up the smashed windows. When petrol became available, tow trucks recovered the vehicles abandoned across Kampala. Makerere University students created a campaign to return looted office equipment to government buildings. Reconstruction efforts were slow, and the city displayed signs of dilapidation several years after the battle. As late as 2000, ruins from the conflict remained along Kampala Road in the city centre.

Casualty statistics were unclear in the immediate aftermath of the battle. According to Honey, fewer than 100 Ugandan soldiers were killed. The Tanzanians estimated that 25 to 30 Ugandan soldiers had died in the city. The Superintendent of Mortuaries supervised the collection of bodies, and by 15 April he had recovered over 200 dead Ugandan soldiers and civilians. He estimated that the total count could be as high as 500. Journalist Baldwin Mzirai stated that 300 corpses were found. Time reported the deaths of "dozens of soldiers and civilians". According to the Daily Monitor, potentially several dozen Ugandan civilians were killed. Over 500 Ugandan soldiers were captured by the TPDF. They were temporarily housed on Kololo before being deported to prisoner-of-war camps in Tanzania. Kisule was attached to a battalion of the TPDF's 205th Brigade to act as its guide and assist it in the capture of Masindi. Sabuni fled to Kenya but was arrested by local authorities in May after being indicted by the Kampala chief magistrate for murder and extradited back to Uganda. The Libyans' few casualties during the battle included some deaths. The TPDF casualties were also deemed to be light; only three members of the 19th Battalion were wounded in the fighting. Large stocks of Libyan munitions were seized, as were significant caches of Ugandan weapons imported from the Soviet Union, United Kingdom, Israel, and Spain.

The Tanzanians recovered the body of Hans Poppe, a biracial Tanzanian police officer who had been killed by the Ugandans in a 1971 border clash. His corpse had been put on display by Amin as evidence that foreign mercenaries were being deployed against him. The body was repatriated and buried. Searches of Amin's residence at Nakasero uncovered a basement occupied by starving prisoners and rotting corpses. Immediately after the seizure of Kampala the TPDF began establishing a new Ugandan government. A significant number of UNLF politicians subsequently settled in the city, and occupied its most luxurious hotels. Social tensions between the former exiles and the rest of Kampala's population quickly grew, as the politicians flaunted their role as "liberators" regardless of their involvement in the war, and began to live in style while the common citizens still suffered from a lack of basic necessities. Msuya was tasked with running errands on behalf of the UNLF ministers, while Walden's 207th Brigade was ordered to assume occupation duties throughout the entirety of Kampala. Tanzanian soldiers subsequently occupied the Kampala International Hotel, looting it and tossing thousands of Qurans (which had been given by Libya to Uganda) stored in it from its balconies. Ojok began recruiting for his UNLF faction Kikosi Maalum, successfully bringing in hundreds of fighters of northeastern origin into the group. Disagreement between Ojok and another UNLF commander, Yoweri Museveni, over the control of surrendered Uganda Army soldiers in Kampala led to a leadership dispute. As a compromise, all UNLF forces were withdrawn from the city. The 201st Brigade proceeded from its position in the north to take Bombo and the 208th moved out to capture Jinja.

Amin's forces were left scattered and disjointed by the seizure of the capital. Discipline in the Uganda Army faltered and the command hierarchy collapsed. According to Ugandan Major Bernard Rwehururu, news of the defeat provoked desertions among the Ugandan ranks, and many officers withdrew to the West Nile sub-region or fled the country. Many northern soldiers, feeling the conflict was primarily a southern affair, had little motivation to continue fighting away from their home territories, while some men began accusing the units which had fought in the south of performing poorly and losing the war. The 250-strong garrison of Mbale defected and established roadblocks around the town to protect it from Amin's forces while awaiting the arrival of the TPDF. A handful of forces rallied in Masindi to plan a counterattack to retake Kampala. Further Tanzanian advances prompted the Ugandans to abandon the town. Ugandan officials in unoccupied portions of the country fled to Kenya, precipitating a collapse in administration. After Kampala's capture, little further damage was caused by the fighting in Uganda. Combat operations in the country continued until 3 June, when Tanzanian forces reached the Sudanese border and eliminated the last resistance.

Caught unprepared by the fall of Kampala, Lule hurriedly compiled a list of ministers meant to represent the ethnic balances of the country. On 13 April he was flown into the city and installed as President of Uganda. The UNLF government's operations were greatly hampered by the theft of equipment from state offices. Though a decree was issued that prohibiting looting, the authorities did not pursue legal action against the looters, and an appeal for the return of state property was modestly successful. Nyerere's decision to use his army to drive far into Ugandan territory and depose Amin resulted in Tanzania becoming deeply involved in Ugandan affairs in the aftermath of the war, against his intentions. After a three-year-long occupation, the TPDF withdrew from Uganda in 1981.

=== Legacy ===
The fall of Kampala on Wednesday 11th April 1979 marked the first and most important stop of a trek of nearly 200 miles. It had taken nearly four months and it will remain a landmark in the annals of Africa's military history.

— Semakula Kiwanuka, 1979

The fall of Kampala marked the first time in the post-colonial history of the continent that an African state seized the capital of another African country. The overthrow of a sovereign head of state by a foreign military had never occurred in modern Africa and had been strongly discouraged by the Organisation of African Unity (OAU). At an OAU conference in July 1979, President Gaafar Nimeiry of Sudan said that the war had set a "serious precedent" and noted that the organisation's charter "prohibits interference in other people's internal affairs and invasion of their territory by armed force." Nigerian Head of State Olusegun Obasanjo shared similar concerns. Some observers dissented from this line of thought and argued that the situation demonstrated that the OAU charter needed reform. Nyerere accused the OAU of shielding black African leaders from criticism, noting that Amin's regime had killed more people than the white minority governments in southern Africa. President Godfrey Binaisa, Lule's successor, praised the Tanzanian intervention.

Despite the controversy, most Western and African states tacitly accepted the action. According to Roy May and Oliver Furley, Amin's removal "marked a mile-post in the history of Africa." On the fifth anniversary of the fall of Kampala, Obote delivered a speech to commemorate the liberation of Uganda from the Amin regime. Footage from the battle was included in the 1980 Tanzania Film Company and Audio Visual Institute colour documentary chronicling the war, Vita vya Kagera. Avirgan and Honey included an account of the event in their 1983 book on the Uganda–Tanzania War, War in Uganda: The legacy of Idi Amin. Though the widespread looting of Kampala was unprecedented in Ugandan history, no comprehensive study of the phenomenon was ever undertaken.
