= Battle of Bombo =

1979 battle between Tanzanian and Ugandan troops

- Part of the Uganda–Tanzania War
- Battle of Bombo (Uganda)
Date	April 1979
Location	Bombo, Uganda
Result	Tanzanian victory
Territorial changes	Bombo occupied by Tanzanian forces

Belligerents
Tanzania	Uganda

Commanders and leaders
Imran Kombe	Unknown

Units involved
201st Brigade	Unknown

Strength
1 brigade	Unknown

Casualties and losses
8 wounded	9 killed ~20 captured

During the Uganda–Tanzania War, the Battle of Bombo was fought in April 1979 at the town of Bombo, Uganda, between Tanzanian forces and Ugandan troops loyal to Idi Amin. After cutting the road between Kampala and Bombo, the Tanzanian 201st Brigade led by Imran Kombe was ordered to head north and seize Bombo. The town was mostly defended by retired Nubian officers of the Uganda Army. The Tanzanians attacked cautiously, and under heavy fire were able to proceed into the town and secure it.

== Background ==
In 1971, Idi Amin launched a military coup that overthrew the President of Uganda, Milton Obote, precipitating a deterioration of relations with neighbouring Tanzania. Tanzanian President Julius Nyerere had close ties with Obote and had supported his socialist orientation. Amin installed himself as President of Uganda and ruled the country under a repressive dictatorship. Nyerere withheld diplomatic recognition of the new government and offered asylum to Obote and his supporters. Relations between Amin and Nyerere remained tense over the following years, and Amin made repeated threats to invade Tanzania.

Uganda's economy languished under Amin's corrupt rule while the armed forces grew increasingly unstable. Some Uganda Army soldiers mutinied in late October 1978. They were defeated and retreated south over the Tanzanian border, closely pursued by loyalist Ugandan forces. The pursuit transformed into an invasion, and on 1 November Amin announced that he was annexing the Kagera Salient in northern Tanzania. Tanzania halted the sudden invasion, mobilised anti-Amin opposition groups, and launched a counter-offensive. After initial advances into Ugandan territory, the Tanzania People's Defence Force (TPDF)'s 20th Division was ordered to push further into the country. President Muammar Gaddafi of Libya, an ally of Amin, attempted to stem the advance by sending an ultimatum to Nyerere, demanding that he withdraw his forces in 24 hours or face the opposition of Libyan troops (which were already operating in Uganda). Nyerere rejected the threat, announcing that Libya's entry into the war did not change the Tanzanian government's view of Amin. Ugandan rebel forces did not have the strength to defeat Libyan units, so Nyerere decided to use the TPDF to take Kampala.

== Prelude ==
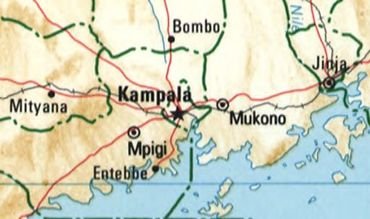
Map of Kampala and surrounding locales, including Bombo to the north

On 7 April the TPDF seized the international airport at Entebbe, cutting off Uganda from Libyan support. On the morning of 10 April Tanzanian forces were ordered to seize Kampala. The TPDF's 201st Brigade led by Brigadier Imran Kombe established roadblocks north of the city and intercepted both forces attempting to reinforce Kampala from the town of Bombo and those attempting to effect a breakout. Over the course of the day they destroyed seven vehicles and killed 80 Ugandan soldiers. Kampala fell on 11 April. The 201st Brigade subsequently moved northward to secure the road. Its first major objective was to capture Bombo.

Bombo was the site of the barracks for the Uganda Army's Malire Regiment and was home to a large Nubian community. Nubians were considered suspect by many Ugandans, as they were viewed as strong supporters of Amin. Many retired Nubian military officers were settled in the area. After Kampala's capture, Nubian soldiers of the Uganda Army began murdering civilians in the town. People leaving Bombo told the press that the Nubian troops' wives partook in the killings, armed with weaponry from the barracks armoury. Most of the regular army soldiers—particularly the younger ones—subsequently fled, leaving Bombo's defence in the hands of the retired officers. In preparation for battle, they set up mortars, medium machine guns, and 106 mm recoilless rifles on each road leading into the town. Kombe ordered his forces to deploy during the night, and by dawn on the morning of the Tanzanian attack, Bombo was completely surrounded.

== Battle ==
As the Tanzanian forces began advancing upon Bombo, the Ugandans laid down heavy fire. The 201st Brigade returned fire and advanced cautiously. When the Tanzanians began entering the town they were surprised to discover that its defenders were mostly old men. Several buildings believed to be held by Ugandan troops were blown up. The Tanzanians eventually captured the town. Eight Tanzanian soldiers were wounded, while nine Ugandan soldiers were killed and about 20, most of them elderly men, captured. The Tanzanians also seized three T-54 tanks from the local military barracks. In the two days following the battle the TPDF searched the nearby area, capturing an additional 80 Ugandan Army soldiers and seizing large quantities of grenades and weapons which had been stored in homes.

== Aftermath ==
After Bombo's capture, the 201st Brigade was tasked with securing Nakasongola Air Base. Aside from a brief encounter with a Ugandan tank on the road, the installation was seized without incident. From there the unit crossed Lake Kyoga and attacked Lira. The war ended on 3 June, when the TPDF reached the Sudanese border and expelled the last pro-Amin forces from Uganda. The Tanzanians withdrew from the country in 1981. In the war's aftermath Bombo did not receive relief aid like other Ugandan localities, due to suspicion of its large Nubian population. As of 2018, there were still buildings in the town that displayed signs of damage from the war nearly four decades earlier.
