= Rhoda Kalema =

Ugandan politician (1929–2025)

- Born: 10 May 1929
- Died: 2025 (aged 95–96)
- Citizenship: Uganda
- Occupation: Politician
- Spouse: William Wilberforce Kalema
- Children: Elizabeth Kalema, Dr. William Kalema, Peter Kalema, Apollo Kalema, Veronica Kalema and Gladys Kalema-Zikusoka
- Father: Martin Luther Nsibirwa

Rhoda Nakibuuka Nsibirwa Kalema (10 May 1929 – 3 August 2025) was a Ugandan politician known as the country's Mother of Parliament.

== Early life and education ==
Rhoda Kalema was born on 10 May 1929, one of 24 children of Martin Luther Nsibirwa, who was twice appointed Katikkiro (Prime Minister) of the Kingdom of Buganda in Uganda. She was born on 10 May 1929 in the Butikkiro, Protectorate of Uganda, the official residence of the Katikkiro, in the Mengo neighbourhood of Kampala.

Kalema attended Gayaza Junior School for a year, and then King's College Budo for the remainder of her primary and secondary schooling. She enrolled in a commercial course in secretarial training, and worked as secretary and bursar at Gayaza High School until 1949. In 1950, she married William Kalema, a teacher at King's College Budo who later became a renowned politician and Government Minister of Commerce. In 1955 she commenced a one-year course in Social Work and Social Administration at Newbattle Abbey, an Adult Education College in the United Kingdom, followed by a Diploma in Social Studies at the University of Edinburgh.

== Political career ==
In 1961, Grace Ibingira and Adoko Nyekon initiated Rhoda Kalema into the Uganda People's Congress. She was a junior minister of Culture and Community Development in Binaisa's administration. However, after the death of her husband in 1972—he was abducted and killed during Idi Amin's regime—she gave up political participation until 1979 when, after Idi Amin's downfall, she joined the National Consultative Council (NCC) formed by the Uganda National Liberation Front under Edward Rugumayo, as one of two female representatives. In 1980 she was one of the founding members of the Uganda Patriotic Movement (UPM).

She was arrested three times by the State agents: on 23 January 1979; on 21 February 1981 (when she and other politicians were arrested after numerous attacks on police stations) and on 4 February 1983.

Kalema became Deputy Minister of Public Service from 1989 until 1991 under President Yoweri Museveni. In 1994, she stood for the Constituent Assembly elections as the Kiboga representative, and defeated 8 male opponents after scooping two thirds of the entire vote. She later retired from politics after grooming a number of notable politicians such as Ruth Nankabirwa, the Chief Whip in Uganda's Cabinet.

She was honoured in 1996 by Uganda's Forum for Women in Democracy "as a transformative leader". On 13 March 2018, she received the Sudreau Global Justice Lifetime Achievement Award from the Pepperdine University School of Law and the Ugandan Judiciary.

== Death ==
Kalema died on 3 August 2025, at the age of 96.

== See also ==
- William Wilberforce Kalema
- Gladys Kalema-Zikusoka
- William Kalema
