= Abdallah Nasur =

Ugandan military officer and government official (born 1946)

Abdul Abdallah Nasur

Governor of Central Province
- In office August 1976 – April 1979
- Preceded by: Samuel Odong
- In office 8 January 1975 – January 1976
- Succeeded by: Samuel Odong

Governor of Karamoja Province
- In office January 1976 – August 1976

Personal details
- Born: 1946 Nakatonya, Bombo, Uganda
- Died: April 18, 2023 (aged 76–77) Kampala, Uganda
- Resting place: Nakatonya, Bombo

Military service
- Allegiance: / Uganda
- Branch: Uganda Army
- Service years: 1964–1979
- Rank: Lieutenant colonel

Abdul Abdallah Nasur (1946 – 18 April 2023) was a Ugandan military officer and administrative official. Under President Idi Amin, he served as Governor of Central Province from January 1975 to January 1976 and from August 1976 to April 1979, when Amin was overthrown. He also served as Governor of Karamoja Province from January to August 1976.

Born in 1946 in Nakatonya, Bombo, Uganda, Nasur enlisted in the Uganda Army in 1964 and was involved in military athletics. He rose in the ranks before being made Governor of Central Province, and in this office he played a leading role in Amin's "Keep Uganda Clean" initiative, garnering a negative reputation for his strict enforcement of the urban beautification campaign. He also frequently intervened in national sporting affairs. Following Amin's overthrow he fled to Kenya, but was extradited back to Uganda to face charges relating to the murder of the Mayor of Masaka, Francis Walugembe. He was convicted in 1982 and sentenced to death, though there remains disagreement over who was actually responsible for the murder. He was pardoned in 2001 and retired to Bombo. He died in 2023.

== Early life ==
Abdallah Nasur was born in 1946 in Nakatonya, Bombo, Uganda to Aljab Manguru and Abdu Abdallah Urada. He attended the Bombo Islamic School, earning "roughly a high school education" according to journalist Andrew Rice. He is a Muslim. Over the course of his life he married three women, though one divorced him and another died. By 2001, he had fathered 36 children.

== Career ==
Nasur joined the Uganda Army in 1964. After becoming a football coach he was promoted from the rank of private to sergeant.

Colonel Idi Amin took power in Uganda following a coup in January 1971. At the time Nasur was serving as the chief sports officer and sports trainer at Kasijjagirwa Barracks in Masaka. That year he was promoted to the rank of second lieutenant. After completing a series of short courses, he was attached to the Ministry of Education and given charge of gymnastics training. In 1974 Amin promoted him to the rank of captain and made him the army's top sports officer. Nasur held this position until Amin appointed him Governor of Central Province on 8 January 1975. (Note: Central Province encompassed Kampala and Entebbe.) That year he was promoted to the rank of lieutenant colonel. Shortly after taking office he replaced the head of the Federation of Uganda Football Associations, despite having no legal authority to do so. He then declared himself disciplinary officer of the Uganda national football team and instituted a team code of conduct. In April he created a committee for sports discipline in Central Province and appointed himself its chairman. Amin also placed Nasur in charge of the Economic Crimes Tribunal, which was tasked with combatting smuggling and economic malpractice. According to Peter F. B. Nayenga, it was also "common knowledge" that Nasur was "personally responsible for many of the deaths" that occurred around Kampala and Entebbe.

As governor, Nasur played a leading role in Amin's "Keep Uganda Clean" initiative, which involved removing trash and beautifying Kampala's streets. He appointed a committee to encourage the public to sanitise the city and oversaw a network of undercover detectives that monitored littering. He regularly toured the city to ensure it was clean, and in May 1975 he had all illegal housing in the Nakawa neighborhood demolished. Nasur also decreed a prohibition on the wearing of slippers, as Kampala residents often wore them to bathe outside or use a toilet, and he associated them with dirt. This adversely impacted the urban poor, who could not afford other types of footwear. This generated allegations that Nasur's subordinates' would force people caught wearing slippers to eat them, or beat and incarcerate them. Nasur later denounced these charges as "baseless". Nevertheless, he garnered a negative reputation for his strict enforcement of the cleanliness campaign and in November Amin criticised him in a military meeting, saying "it is wrong on the part of the governor who was misbehaving to the extent of flattening people's cars and beating women wearing slippers". In January 1976 Amin transferred Nasur, making him Governor of Karamoja Province and replaced him with Samuel Odong.

In August 1976 Odong was moved and Amin reappointed Nasur Governor of Central Province. Shortly after reassuming his office, Nasur organised eight cleanliness zones in Kampala. He then led officials in conducting "spot checks" around the city, evicting residents of unkempt houses, seizing untidy businesses, and closing down disorganised markets. These actions dispossessed numerous citizens of their belongings. Nasur believed that unmarried women increased crime and prostitution and publicly suggested that they should leave urban areas and engage in agricultural production in the countryside. In an attempt to reduce crime, he banned the brewing and consumption of alcohol in certain parts of Kampala. He also closed down several shops and restaurants in Katwe, accusing their owners of overcharging for goods. In 1977 he forced out the chairman of the National Council of Sports and took his place. In this capacity he banned the Express football club after it had defeated an army team in a game, accusing its members of subversion. The following year he ejected Denis Obua from the national football team for drinking before the 1978 African Cup of Nations. He accompanied the team to Ghana where it played in the tournament. He was still governor in April 1979.

== Murder trial and imprisonment ==
In late 1978 Uganda invaded Tanzania. This started a war between the two countries, and in April 1979 Tanzanian troops and Ugandan rebels overthrew Amin's regime. Nasur fled to Kenya, (Note: Researcher Thomas Lowman claimed that Nasur was arrested in Bombo during the war.) reportedly taking 75 million Ugandan shillings ($10 million) with him. Local authorities arrested him in Kakamega and on 16 June 1979 he was extradited to Uganda and charged with the murder of the Mayor of Masaka, Francis Walugembe. Walugembe had been killed in Masaka on 21 September 1972.

"I have been convicted of murdering a man I have never seen. Those who have accused me may go and celebrate that we have convicted Nasur. I, as a Muslim, I am holding this Koran knowing that I am charged falsely, but those who have charged me will be the ones to suffer."

— Excerpt of Nasur's response to his murder conviction, 26 January 1982

The murder case was tried in court before Chief Justice of the High Court of Uganda George Masika. Thomas Ntale, Walugembe's son; John Kagimbi, a carpenter; and Betty Najjuma, a local schoolteacher; all testified that they saw Nasur slit Walugembe's throat. Nasur testified in his own defence, arguing that he rarely wore military uniform while at Masaka—contrary to witness testimony which said he killed Walugembe while in uniform. He also said he was out buying food for the garrison at the time of the killing. A defence witness, Cecilia Nakanwagi, said she saw a different "small, red-eyed man" kill the mayor. Defence lawyer Protazio Ayigihugu argued that Ntale was not present at the scene, saying it was highly unlikely he would have gone to where his father was being killed for fear of being targeted himself. Ayigihugu also maintained that there were inconsistencies in where the prosecution witnesses said the murder took place. Masika delivered his judgement on 26 January 1982. In his ruling, he wrote that the prosecution witnesses all placed the scene of the murder at the quarter guard at Kasijjagirwa Barracks. He discounted Nasur's testimony as untrue and concluded, "I am satisfied beyond reasonable doubt that the prosecution has proved their case against the accused and accordingly, I convict him as charged." Nasur was sentenced to death. He appealed his case to the Supreme Court of Uganda, but the appeal was rejected. He was subsequently incarcerated at Luzira Maximum Security Prison.

There remains disagreement over who actually was responsible for Walugembe's murder. In 1991 Ntale admitted he had lied about witnessing his father's death. Following the trial, a series of other witnesses signed affidavits which maintained that a soldier, Ali Nyege, abducted Walugembe and stabbed him at the barracks, and that Nasur drove up shortly thereafter and spoke with Nyege. In a 2002 interview Nasur maintained that he had only happened upon Walugembe's murder scene later in the day of the crime, after the mayor had been killed. Other sources claim that Brigadier Isaac Maliyamungu murdered Walugembe.

== Later life ==
Nasur was pardoned by President Yoweri Museveni on 10 September 2001 and released the following day. The pardon was received positively by his friends and family, though some Ugandans felt he should have been executed, including members of the Walugembe family. Following his release he retired to his former home in Bombo and became a vocal supporter of Museveni. Reflecting on Amin in 2003, he said, "Everybody makes mistakes. Do not punish Amin. We should leave the judgment to God." He remained a devout Muslim in retirement, praying frequently in the local mosque, and was a respected leader in Bombo's Nubian community. Nasur died on 18 April 2023 at Nakasero Hospital in Kampala, following an affliction with pneumonia and a decline in health related to diabetes and heart trouble.

== Works cited ==
- Decker, Alicia (2010). "Idi Amin's Dirty War: Subversion, Sabotage, and the Battle to Keep Uganda Clean, 1971-1979". The International Journal of African Historical Studies. 43 (3): 489–513. JSTOR 23046822.
- "From Racism to Genocide: Extracts from Report of the International Commission of Jurists". Transition (49). Indiana University Press; Hutchins Center for African and African American Research at Harvard University: 8–12, 14–16, 18–19. 1975. doi:10.2307/2934888. JSTOR 2934888.
- Kasozi, A.B.K. (1994). Nakanyike Musisi; James Mukooza Sejjengo (eds.). Social Origins of Violence in Uganda, 1964–1985. Montreal; Quebec: McGill-Queen's University Press. ISBN 978-0-7735-1218-4.
- Lowman, Thomas James (2020). Beyond Idi Amin: Causes and Drivers of Political Violence in Uganda, 1971-1979 (PDF) (PhD thesis). Durham University.
- Matatu, Gordon (May 1979). "The End of Uganda's Nightmare". Africa. No. 93. pp. 10–16.
- Mutibwa, Phares Mukasa (1992). Uganda Since Independence: A Story of Unfulfilled Hopes. Trenton, New Jersey: Africa World Press. ISBN 0-86543-357-7.
- Nayenga, Peter F. B. (September 1979). "Review: Myths and Realities of Idi Amin Dada's Uganda". African Studies Review. 22 (2): 127–138. doi:10.2307/523817. JSTOR 523817. S2CID 146356054.
- Rice, Andrew (1 December 2002). "Amin's Shadow" (PDF). Institute of Current World Affairs. AR (6).
- Rwehururu, Bernard (2002). Cross to the Gun. Kampala: Monitor. OCLC 50243051.
- Singh, Madanjeet (2012). Culture of the Sepulchre: Idi Amin's Monster Regime. New Delhi: Penguin Books India. ISBN 978-0-670-08573-6.
