= Nasur =

Nasur is a surname. Notable people with the surname include:

- Abdallah Nasur (1946–2023), Ugandan military officer and government official
- Abdulla Nasur (fl. 1977–1978), Ugandan footballer
- Miguel Nasur (born 1935), Chilean footballer and leader
