= Onapito Ekomoloit =

Ugandan journalist and politician

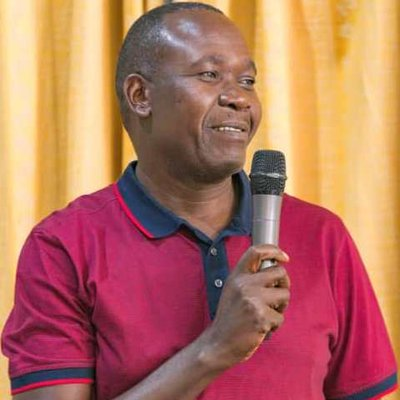
- Onapito Ekomoloit speaking at an event
- Born: April 26, 1966; Asalatap, Wera County, Amuria District
- Died: September 27, 2024 (aged 58); Kampala Hospital
- Burial place: Asalatap, Wera County, Amuria District
- Education: Makerere University, American University
- Occupations: Journalist, author, politician, corporate executive
- Years active: 1991 - 2024
- Known for: Journalism, politics, community service
- Notable work: Tears and Triumph: My Life with Yoweri Museveni and Others

Onapito Francis Ekomoloit (April 26, 1966 – September 27, 2024), commonly known as Onapito Ekomoloit or Ona, was a Ugandan journalist, writer, politician, and corporate executive. He served as a Member of the 6th Parliament and as Presidential Press Secretary to President Yoweri Kaguta Museveni before transitioning to a career in the private sector. At the time of his death, he was Board Chairman of Nile Breweries Limited and Soroti Fruits Limited (TEJU), and a board member of MTN Uganda and Cavendish University. Ekomoloit was also a political commentator, frequently appearing on Ugandan radio and television programs.

== Early life and education ==
Onapito Francis Ekomoloit was born on April 26, 1966, in Asalatap., Wera County, Amuria District, Uganda, to John Onapito, a clinical officer, and Fais Nora Abuin, a nurse. Abuin's father, Yairo Onyait, who was born in the late 19th century, is reported to have inherited a chieftainship and later served as a local agent of Semei Kakungulu, a Muganda leader who collaborated with the British administration in extending colonial control over eastern and northern Uganda.

Ekomoloit’s father left school early to start a family but went on to establish a private medical practice as a clinical officer. Ekomoloit began his education at Angole Wera Primary School and Kidongole Primary School, before attending St. Edward’s Secondary School, Bukuumi, Gulu Secondary School, and St. Peter’s College, Tororo. He later earned a Bachelor’s degree in Mass Communication from Makerere University and a Master of Arts in Communication, Journalism, and Public Affairs from American University in Washington, D.C.

== Journalism (1989 - 2024) ==
Ekomoloit’s journalism career began in 1989 when he enrolled in the Mass Communication program at Makerere University, which was only in its second intake at the time. Contemporary members of his class included Adonia Ayebare, Uganda’s Permanent Representative to the United Nations; Susan Nsibirwa, Managing Director of Nation Media Group in Uganda; and Dismas Nkunda, co-founder and Chief Executive Officer of Atrocities Watch Africa.

After completing his undergraduate degree in 1992—the same year The Monitor newspaper was founded—Ekomoloit was among four classmates recruited as reporters by co-founders Charles Onyango-Obbo and David Ouma Balikowa. He worked at The Monitor for three years before leading a group of about ten journalists to establish The Crusader newspaper, where he served as Editor-in-Chief.

Before joining The Monitor, Ekomoloit worked at The Weekly Topic newspaper in 1991 as a contributor. He also lectured in Mass Communication at Makerere University before transitioning into politics. Some of his students include Andrew Mwenda, Ibrahim Ssemujju Nganda, Stella Nyanzi, Uganda Electoral Commission Spokesperson Julius Mucunguzi, William Tayebwa, and Aisha Sembatya Nakiwala.

Until his death, Onapito Ekomoloit appeared regularly as a political commentator on radio and television programs, including Capital FM’s Capital Gang, KFM’s Hot Seat, NBS TV's Round Table, and NTV’s Fourth Estate.

== Uganda Parliament (1998 - 2000) ==
In 1998, following Jeje Odong’s resignation from Parliament and the Cabinet after his appointment as Commander of the Uganda People’s Defence Force, Onapito Ekomoloit contested and won the by-election for the Amuria County parliamentary seat. He served one term and sought re-election in 2001 but was defeated by Ben Etonu. During his tenure, Ekomoloit introduced a Constitutional Amendment Bill in 1999, also known as the Onapito Bill, which sought to separate the roles of ministers and Members of Parliament. The bill however was not passed.

== Public Service (2001 - 2006) ==
Onapito Ekomoloit held several high-profile positions in the Government of Uganda. From 2001 to 2006, he served as Deputy Presidential Press Secretary and later as Presidential Press Secretary to President Yoweri Kaguta Museveni.

== Corporate Career (2006 - 2024) ==
After leaving State House, Onapito Ekomoloit joined Nile Breweries Limited in 2006, drawing on his experience in public relations and media management. He initially served as Corporate Affairs Manager and was later promoted to Legal and Corporate Affairs Director in 2016. Following his retirement in June 2023, marked by a celebratory send-off that coincided with the launch of his autobiography, Tears and Triumph: My Life with Yoweri Museveni and Others, he was appointed Board Chairman of Nile Breweries, a position he held until his death. Ekomoloit also served as Patron of the Uganda Alcohol Industry Association, Board Chairman of Soroti Fruits Limited, and a board member of MTN Uganda and Cavendish University. During his corporate career, he championed several community initiatives, including founding the Nile Breweries Equality Scholarship, which supports the education of talented students from underprivileged rural areas.

== Death and funeral ==
Onapito Ekomoloit died on September 27, 2024, after a brief illness. A medical report presented during his funeral service revealed that he had been diagnosed with an aggressive form of lung cancer that had severely damaged approximately 80 percent of his lung capacity. He was accorded an official state burial and laid to rest on November 30, 2024 in Asalatap, Wera County, Amuria District, Uganda, nearly two months after his death, in accordance with the provisions of his will. Ekomoloit was interred in a mausoleum that he had begun constructing just a month before his passing

== Family and personal life ==
The Onapito family includes several members who have served in public and professional roles in Uganda and abroad.These include Joyce Ikwaput-Nyeko, who served in the Ministry of Agriculture, Animal Industry and Fisheries; Elizabeth Kedi Banyoya, who served with the Ministry of Public Service; Samuel Otim, who served with the Uganda Police; and Dr. Alice Jolden Oriokot, a medical doctor practicing in Palapye, Botwsana.

Onapito Ekomoloit married his first wife, Margaret Aanyu, a Chief Magistrate in the Ugandan Judiciary, with whom he had one son. Aanyu passed away in October 2023. He later married Catherine Kiyai Okwii, a journalist, and together they had two children.

== Books and Publications ==
- Tears and Triumph: My Life with Yoweri Museveni and Others
