= Peter Allen (jurist) =

British jurist

Sir Peter Allen

Chief Justice of Uganda
- In office August 1985 – 1986
- Preceded by: George Masika
- Succeeded by: Samuel Wako Wambuzi

Acting Head of State of Uganda
- In office 25 January 1986 – 29 January 1986

High Court Judge of Lesotho
- In office 1987–1989

Personal details
- Born: Peter Austin Philip Jermyn Allen; 20 October 1929 (age 96) Leicester, England
- Citizenship: British
- Occupation: Jurist, colonial official
- Known for: Interim Head of State of Uganda (1986); Chief Justice of Uganda
- Awards: Knighted (1987 New Year Honours)

Sir Peter Austin Philip Jermyn Allen (born 20 October 1929) is a British jurist and former colonial official who served in Uganda for more than three decades. He served in the colonial police as Assistant Superintendent of Police and later became Principal of the Uganda Law School, a High Court judge, and Chief Justice of Uganda 1985 to 1986. In January 1986 he acted as interim head of state during a power vacuum before administering the oath of office to Yoweri Museveni. He was knighted in the 1987 New Year Honours.

== Early life and career ==
Allen was born in Leicester, England. He served eight years in the British Royal Artillery before leaving the army in 1955. He then travelled to the British Protectorate of Uganda and joined the Uganda Police as an Assistant Superintendent, serving for about eight years.

During this period he met a Sergeant Idi Amin (then a heavyweight boxing champion) at the 1956 Uganda Amateur Boxing Championships. He also served briefly as aide-de-camp to Governor Sir Frederick Crawford.

After Uganda's independence in October 1962, Allen stayed and transferred from the police to the newly established law school, where he trained magistrates and students preparing for the English Bar examinations. He later became principal of the law school.

In 1969 he was appointed Chief Magistrate. He later became a High Court judge (sworn in under Idi Amin).

=== Chief Justice and interim presidency ===
In August 1985, after the military overthrow of Milton Obote by General Tito Okello, Allen was appointed Chief Justice of Uganda by the new military authorities, replacing George Masika.

In January 1986, as forces of the National Resistance Army under Yoweri Museveni advanced on Kampala, President Okello and other senior officials fled. Under the constitutional succession then in force, the Chief Justice ranked third after the President and Prime Minister. Allen therefore became acting Head of State for four days. On 29 January 1986 he administered the presidential oath to Museveni on the steps of Parliament in Kampala.

== Publications ==
Allen published memoirs of his time in Uganda, including:

- Days of Judgement: A Judge in Idi Amin's Uganda (1987)
- Interesting Times: Uganda Diaries, 1955–86 (Book Guild, 2000)
