= Bombo, Uganda =

Town in Uganda

Bombo
- Town
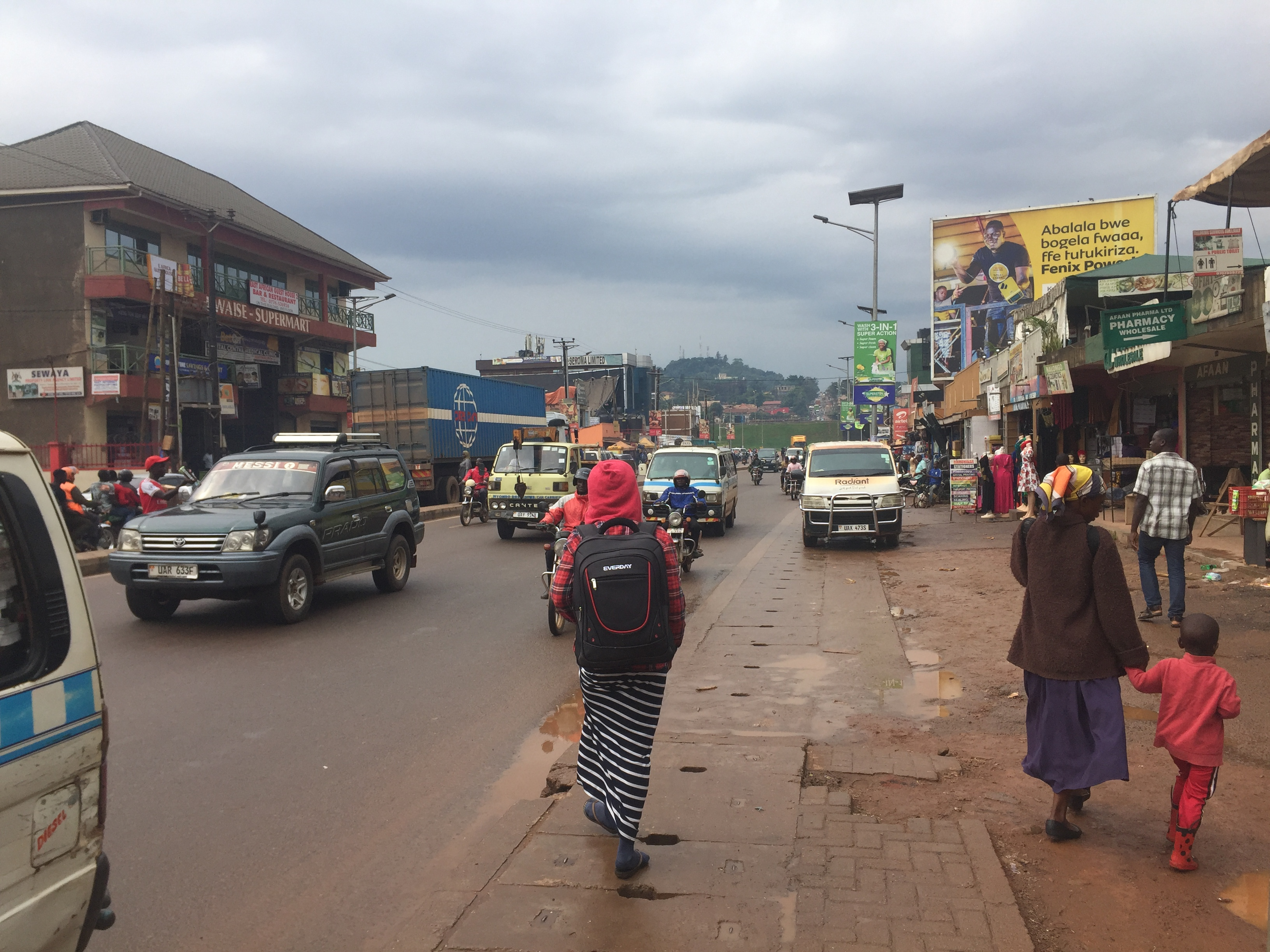
- Bombo Road

- Location in Uganda
- Coordinates: 00°34′40″N 32°32′42″E
- Country: Uganda
- Region: Central Region
- District: Luweero District

Population (2014 Census)
  - Total: 26,370

Bombo is a town in Luweero District in the Central Region of Uganda.

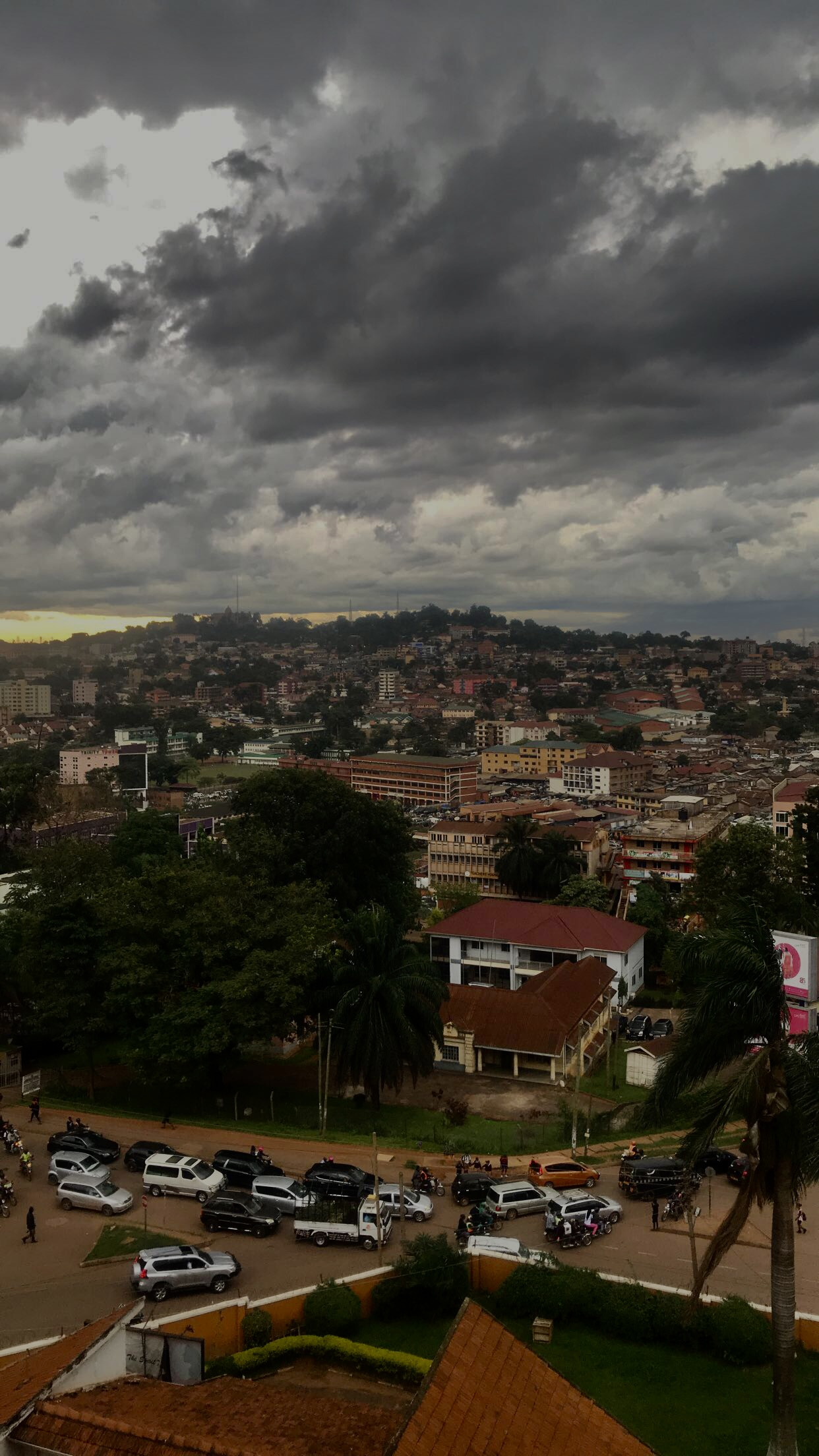
An overview of Bombo road

== History ==
Many officers and soldiers of the Uganda Army (UA) settled in Bombo upon their retirement during the Second Republic of Uganda (1971–79). At the time, many inhabitants were Nubians, an ethnic group whose members were viewed as supporters of President Idi Amin. The town also hosted the barracks for the UA's Malire Regiment. As a result, Bombo was affected by the Uganda–Tanzania War. After Idi Amin's government had been factually overthrown and Kampala been captured by the Tanzania People's Defence Force (TPDF) as well as allied Ugandan rebels on 11 April, UA soldiers of Nubian origin as well as their families began to terrorize other locals in Bombo. After several killings, many younger soldiers fled the town, but the retired officers set up defenses to oppose the TPDF's 201st Brigade that was approaching the town from the south.

The Battle of Bombo in April 1979 resulted in a Tanzanian victory. Several Ugandan defenders were killed, much weaponry was captured by the TPDF, and the town suffered substantial damage. Many Nubian, Kakwa, and Lugbara locals subsequently fled the town, fearing reprisals by anti-Amin groups. Following the war's conclusion, Bombo was not provided with relief aid like other settlements, as the new Ugandan government suspected its large Nubian population. Many buildings in the town continued to display damage suffered during the 1979 battle for decades. Bombo's barracks continued to be used during the Ugandan Bush War, and the Uganda National Liberation Army was known to imprison civilians there from 1981.

In the 1980s, Kenya forced many former Nubian inhabitants of Bombo to return to Uganda. They were denied refugee status, and often fell into poverty. In 1995, Bombo was also stripped of its municipality status. Since then, locals have struggled to regain this status.

== Location ==
Bombo is approximately 32 kilometres (20 mi), by road, north of Uganda's capital, Kampala. The coordinates of Bombo are 0°34'36.0"N, 32°32'42.0"E (Latitude:0.576667; Longitude:32.545000).

== Overview ==
Bombo is one of three town councils in Luweero District, the other two being Luweero and Wobulenzi. All three town councils are located on the Kampala - Masindi highway, that continues to Gulu and Arua in the Northern Region.

The town has a large Nubian minority, the Nubians having settled there when they came from Sudan to serve in the British Colonial army.

Bombo has an army barracks and was the headquarters of the Ugandan Ministry of Defense until December 2007, when they moved to Mbuya in Nakawa Division in south-eastern Kampala. Bombo, however, remains the headquarters of the Uganda Land Forces.

== Former Bombo District ==
The area in which Bombo town is a main township became Bombo District, one of the first regions that initially received district status when Uganda became independent in October 1962. In 1967, the district was renamed East Mengo. In 1974, Uganda reorganized from districts into provinces, and East Mengo became the province of Bombo. Provinces were reorganized into districts in 1980, and the district of Luwero was created, with Bombo town as one of the main town councils.

== Population ==
In 2002, the national census estimated the population the town to be 16,699. In 2010, the Uganda Bureau of Statistics (UBOS), estimated the population at 20,500. In 2011, UBOS estimated the mid-year population at 21,000. In August 2014, the national population census put the population at 26,370.

In 2015 the population of the town was projected at 26,300. In 2020 the midyear population of Bombo Town was projected at 29,600. It was calculated that the population of the town increased at an average rate of 2.4 percent, annually between 2015 and 2020.

Historical population
Year	Pop.	±%
2002	16,699	—
2010	20,500	+22.8%
2011	21,000	+2.4%
2014	26,370	+25.6%
2015	26,300	−0.3%
2020	29,600	+12.5%

== Notable people ==
- Abdallah Nasur

== See also ==
- List of cities and towns in Uganda
