= Samuel Wako Wambuzi =

The Honourable Samuel W. Wambuzi
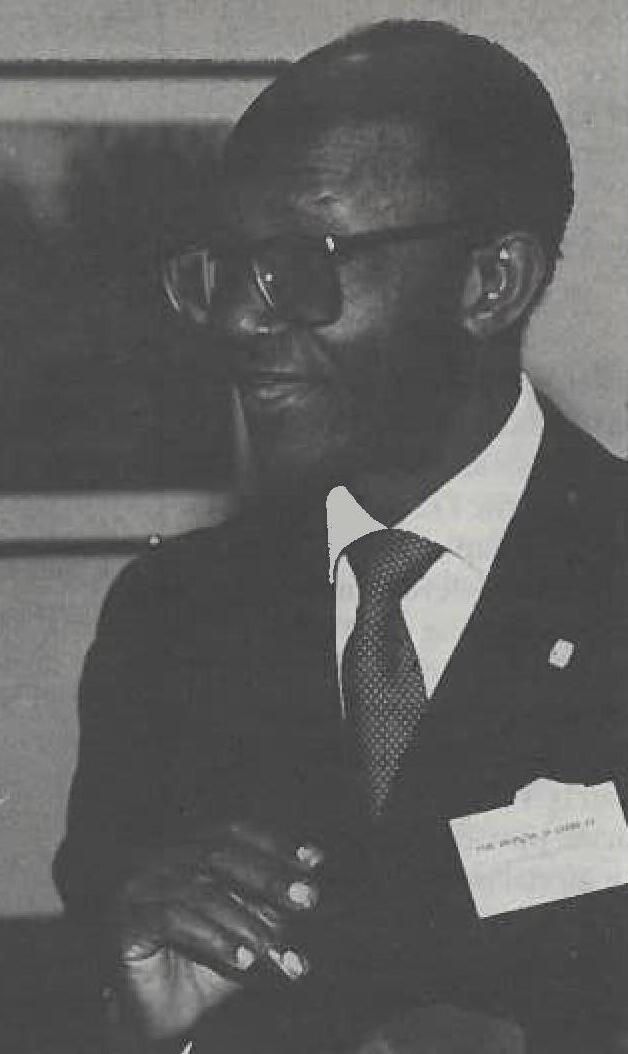

Chief Justice of Uganda
- In office 1986–2001
- Preceded by: Peter Allen
- Succeeded by: Benjamin Josses Odoki

Chief Justice of Uganda
- In office 21 September 1972 – 1975
- Preceded by: Benedicto Kiwanuka
- Succeeded by: Mohammed Saied

Chief Justice of Uganda
- In office 1979–1980
- Preceded by: Mohammed Saied
- Succeeded by: George Masika

Personal details
- Born: 23 January 1931 (age 95) Namalemba, Kamuli District
- Education: Makerere University
- Occupation: judge, scholar

Samuel Wako Wambuzi (born January 23, 1931) is a Ugandan scholar and jurist who served three times as the Chief Justice of Uganda; from 1972 to 1975, 1979 to 1980 and 1986 to 2001.

== Early life ==
Wambuzi was born in Kaliro village, at Namalemba in the present day now known as Kamuli district, his mother Milyamu Naigaga died one year after Wambuzi was born and was raised by his stepmother.

He attended Makerere University College and Kabete Veterinary School, Wambuzi flanks in his examination mostly his final examination leading him not qualified in subject of profession but do excel other subject.

He was intermediated by the love of music at his youthful age, he was a village musician performed mostly in Bugembe, Namutumba, Kaliro and Busoga villages.

He had been a chief judge since before the coming of the military leader; Idi Amin. He's lived his whole together with family in Kampala, Uganda.

Wambuzi spanned over 40 years in the career, he served as the acting director of public prosecutions and president of the East African Court of Appeal during his service.

Wambuzi recorded straight regarding the treatise event of the country in a shake to its cultural, political, military and legal core.

== Red Pepper newspaper interrelations ==
In 2015, Wambuzi sued Red Pepper newspaper to high court over a story published title Exposed; 100 most indebted personalities revealed. He was among the 100 listed personalities (tycoons) that the publications was struggling to pay off loan of a business an about Shs10bn that was gotten from a financial body to boast the GreenHill Academy, after the wordings from the story meant that in common with the 100 people that the Red Pepper newspaper was to serialized, according to Wambuzi.

In 2017, the court orders the newspaper to pay Wambuzi an amount of UGX 375M and extra UGX 50million for exemplary damages after the publication lost the case which was sought as general and exemplary damage for libel and for permanent injunction. This rulings was delivered by Justice Patricia Basaza Wasswa who ordered the Red Pepper newspaper to pay the Plaintiff for the general damage of libel and later in 2015 was granted the cost.

== Personal life ==
He was married to Gladys Wambuzi, the founder of Greenhill Academy in Kampala died of cancer, with her had 3 children; Maria, William and Samson. In 2008, he married Marion Nakabuye Ddamulira at St. Paul's Cathedral, Namirembe.

== Book ==
- The odyssey of a judicial career in precarious times: my trials and triumphs as a three-time chief justice. Samuel William Wako Wambuzi, Cross House Books 2014. Book, Samuel William Wako Wambuzi, ISBN 9781910048047, 1910048046, OCLC 960028730
- The role of an advocate: speech by the Honourable Chief Justice S.W.W. Wambuzi 5th July, 1974 to the Uganda Law Society at the Law Development Centre. S W W Wambuzi. Uganda Law Society, Kampala, LDC Publishers, 1974. Wambuzi, S.W.W. Role of an advocate. OCLC 705987343, OCLC 22561276. N: At head of title: The Uganda Law Society.

== Bibliography ==
- Wambuzi, S. W. W. (2014). Odyssey judicial career I'm precarious times. Christian House Books. ISBN 978-1910048047.
- The Odyssey of a Judicial Career in Precarious Times
- My Trials and Triumphs as a Three-Term Chief Justice of Uganda.
- The odyssey of a judicial career in precarious times: my trials and triumphs as a three-time Chief Justice of Uganda. S W W Wambuzi, UK, Christian House Books, 2014. Biography. Genre/Form: Biographies, History, Biography, Named Person: S W W Wambuzi. Biography. ISBN 9781910048047, 1910048046, OCLC 910308533.
