= Oliver Furley =

English historian

Oliver Willis Furley (1927 - 29 November 2015) was an English historian and political scientist, formerly head of the department of politics and history at Coventry University and afterwards a visiting professor there. He was a specialist in the history and politics of East Africa about which he wrote a number of books.

== Early life and education ==
Oliver Furley was born in Nottingham in 1927. He was educated at Nottingham High School, before being evacuated to Salcombe during the Second World War, where he was privately taught.

== Career ==
Furley began teaching as a junior professor at the University of St Andrews. He also taught for many years at Makerere University in Uganda before he was forced to leave with his family by Idi Amin's regime in 1972. He moved to Coventry Polytechnic, now Coventry University, where he was head of the department of history and politics. Until shortly before his death, long after his official retirement, he was a visiting professor at Coventry. He was a visiting professor at Duke University.

His first book was A history of education in East Africa (1978) with Tom Watson. He also wrote about child soldiers, peacekeeping, and democratisation in Africa. He edited several collections with Roy May, most recently Ending Africa's wars (2006).

== Death ==
Furley died on 29 November 2015.

== Selected publications ==
- A history of education in East Africa. NOK Publishers, New York, 1978. (Studies in East African Society and History) (With Tom Watson) ISBN 0883570459
- Uganda's retreat from turmoil? Centre for Security and Conflict Studies, London, 1987.
- Child soldiers and youths in African conflicts: International reactions. Coventry University African Studies Centre, Coventry, 1995. ISBN 0905949447
- Conflict in Africa. Tauris, London, 1995. (Editor) ISBN 1850436908
- Peacekeeping in Africa. Ashgate, Aldershot, 1998. (Edited with Roy May) ISBN 1859724922
- Democratisation in Uganda. Research Institute for the Study of Conflict and Terrorism, 1999.
- African interventionist states. Ashgate, Aldershot, 2001. (Edited with Roy May) ISBN 1840149892
- Ending Africa's wars: Progressing to peace. Ashgate, Aldershot, 2006. (Edited with Roy May) ISBN 0754639320
