= Janet Nsibirwa Mdoe =

Ugandan educationist and writer

Janet Nsibirwa Mdoe (1920–2019) was a Ugandan educator, children's author and school administrator known for her contributions to primary and children's literature in Uganda. With a teacher career spanning more than six decades, she was among Uganda's longest serving educators. She also authored numerous books for schoolchildren.

== Early life and education ==
Mdoe was born in Kasawo, Uganda. Her father was Martin Luther Nsibirwa, the Kattikiro of Buganda from 1929 to 1941. She attended a Church of Uganda school in Ntenjeru, Bugerrere before joining Gayaza High School. In 1936, she enrolled at Buloba Teacher Training College, where she trained as a teacher during a period when educators were commonly referred to as vernacular teachers.

== Career ==
=== Teacher ===
Mdoe began her teaching career in 1939, at Buloba College Demonstration School, becoming one of Uganda's earliest female primary school teachers. She later taught at Gayaza High School between 1940 and 1943.

In 1944 she moved to Sudan where she taught during a period when female teachers were rare in the country. She returned to Uganda in 1947 and studied at Makerere University. During this time, she met her husband, Micki Mdoe, a sociology student.

Following her marriage, Mdoe moved to Tanzania where she taught in several schools before returning to Uganda in 1956. She subsequently taught at Mengo Preparatory School, where one of her pupils was Ronald Muwenda Mutebi II, the current Kabaka of Buganda.

Throughout her career Mdoe held several leadership positions in education, including headmistress of Buddo Junior School, Matale Girls' School and deputy principal and principal of Lady Irene Teacher Training College, Ndejje. She also completed a Commonwealth scholarship and offered bursaries to study Infant Teaching Methods at Stranmills college by UK.

In 1993 Mdoe and her sister Gladys Wambuzi thought of starting up their own school which was opened up in 1994 as Greenhill Academy in Kibuli. The school later expanded and has three compasses; Kibuli, Buwaate and Kansanga.

=== Writer ===
Mdoe wrote children's educational books for more than four decades. Many of her works were originally produced for use by pupils in schools where she taught. In 2005, Fountain Publishers announced the publication and public release of a collection of her books, recognizing her contribution to children's education and literature in Uganda.

== Selected works ==
- Okusoma nga kuwooma.
- Awo olwatuuka.
- Tusome oluganda.
- Mujje tusome tuyige.

== Personal life ==
Mdoe was a mother of two children, Joy Maraka and Kenneth Mdoe and had six grandchildren.
