= George Masika =

Ugandan judge

Chief Justice of Uganda
- In office 1980–1985
- Preceded by: Peter Allen (Jurist)
- Succeeded by: Samuel Wako Wambuzi

Personal details
- Born: Japheth George Masika; September 26, 1932 Butooto village, Buwagogo Sub-county, Mbale District, Uganda
- Citizenship: Ugandan
- Spouse: Ruth Christine Mujunga
- Education: Makerere University; University of Southampton
- Occupation: Judge, lawyer, academic

George Masika (born 26 September 1932) also known as Japheth George Masika is a Ugandan judge who served as the Chief Justice of Uganda from 1980 to 1985.

== Early life and education ==
Masika was born in Butooto village, Buwagogo sub-county in Bubulo County, Mbale district on September 26, 1932, to Jefferson Wafula (father) and Lakeli Nasamba (mother). While still young, his parents moved to Kenya where he had both his primary and secondary education.

He began his education from Friends African Mission Primary School and Lugulu Primary School for his primary education. He later joined Kakamega Government African School and Alliance High School for his secondary education.

In 1954, Masika joined Makerere University for a Bachelors of Arts degree. He attained a scholarship and studied law at Southampton University in Britain where he graduated in 1958.

== Career ==
After his return from Britain, he joined the Ministry of Justice and became deputy registrar in 1962. In 1963, he was appointed deputy Director of Public Prosecutions (DPP) and Director in 1959.

In 1980 to 1985, Masika was Chief Justice of Uganda before he went into exile. While in exile in 1973, he was appointed senior lecture in the Faculty of Law, University of Nairobi. He later lectured law at Makerere University.

== Personal life ==
Masika is married to Ruth Christine Mujunga.
