= Semakula Kiwanuka =

Ugandan historian, diplomat, author and researcher

- Born: Matia Semakula Mulumba Kiwanuka; 16 September 1939 (age 87); Mityana, Uganda
- Occupations: Historian, Researcher, Diplomat
- Employer: Government of Uganda
- Title: President of The Uganda Society
- Term: 1967–1968
- Predecessor: S. J. K Baker
- Successor: J. L. Dixon

Academic background
- Education: Namilyango College (1955); University of London (BA, 1965; PhD); Balliol College, Oxford (1979)

Academic work
- Institutions: Makerere University (1964–1968; 1973–1976; 1991–1994); Northwestern University (1968–1970); Duke University (1968–1970); University of Cambridge (1977–1981); University of Calabar (1981–1985)

Matia Semakula Mulumba Kiwanuka (born 16 September 1939, in Mityana) is a Ugandan historian, diplomat, writer and researcher.

He was named Uganda's Permanent Representative to the United Nations in 1996 and in 2000, he was the chairman of the First Committee (Disarmament and International Security) at the United Nations

He was appointed Uganda's Minister of State for Luwero Triangle in 2003 and later in 2005, State Minister for Finance, Planning and Economic Development (Investment)

He also served as the 34th president of the Uganda Society between 1967 and 1968.

== Background and education ==
Hailing from Mityana, Semakula Kiwanuka attended Namilyango College between 1951 and 1955. Under the relationship between Makerere University and the University of London, he received a Bachelor of Arts in history, and in 1965, a doctorate in history from the University of London's School of Oriental and African Studies. In 1979, he completed a post-graduate diploma in development economics at Balliol College, Oxford.

== Career ==
=== Academia ===
Starting as a special lecturer at Makerere University between 1964 and 1968, Semakula Kiwanuka then became a senior lecturer within the same institution. With sponsorship from the United States Department of State, he then was Visiting Associate Professor in African History at Northwestern and Duke Universities (1968–1970).

Later he served as dean of the Faculty of Arts and professor and head of the History Department at Makerere University (1973–1976) and a number of academic appointments thereafter, such as visiting scholar at the University of Cambridge (August 1977 – April 1981); visiting fellow at St. Edmunds College, University of Cambridge; and senior visitor in the Department of History and Philosophy of Science, Cambridge. He was the director of studies at the University of Calabar in Nigeria from 1981 to 1985.

He later worked as the dean of the School of Post-Graduate Studies and Research at Makerere University between 1991 and 1994.

=== Diplomat ===
In 1996, he was appointed Permanent Representative of Uganda to the United Nations. Semakula Kiwanuka then served as Uganda's ambassador to the United Arab Emirates based in Abu Dhabi between 2009 and 2013

== Publications ==
- A History of Buganda from the Foundation of the Kingdom to 1900
- Amin and the Tragedy of Uganda
- Colonial Policies and Administrations in Africa: The Myths of the Contrasts (1993)

== See also ==
- The Uganda Society
