= Susan Nsibirwa =

Ugandan corporate executive

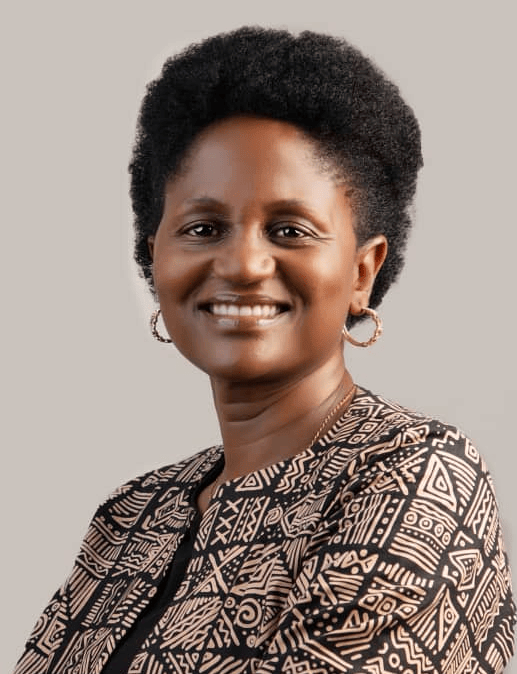
- Susan Nsibirwa
- Born: August 1970 (age 55–56); Uganda
- Education: Gayaza High School; A-level, Makerere University (Bachelor of Mass Communication); University of Nicosia (Master of Administration); The Chartered Institute of Marketing (MCIM)
- Occupations: marketer, corporate executive, leadership consultant
- Years active: 1992 — present
- Title: Managing Director of Nation Media Group

Susan Nsibirwa, is a Ugandan marketer and corporate executive who serves the Managing Director of Nation Media Group, since January 2024. She replaced Tonny Glencross, who had served in that role since 2019.

== Early life and education ==
Nsibirwa was born in Kampala, Uganda to John and Mrs Allen Nsibirwa. She is a granddaughter to former Katikkiro of Buganda Martin Luther Nsibirwa. She attended Aunt Clare Kindergarten Namirembe, Kitante Primary School for PLE, Nabisunsa Girls Secondary School for O-level and Gayaza High School for A-level. After she was admitted to Makerere University, in Kampala, the capital city of Uganda, where she graduated with a Bachelor in Mass Communication degree in 1987. Her second degree is a Master of Administration obtained from University of Nicosia, in Cyprus.

== Career ==
Nsibirwa landed her first employment at the French Embassy in Kampala as a Press Attaché from August 1992 to December 1994. Afterward, she joined Scanad Uganda as a media manager from January 1995 to December 1997 before moving to Saatchi and Saatchi, where she served as a Regional Account Manager from January 1999 to March 2002. Following this, she took on the role of Advertising/Brand Manager at MTN Uganda from 2002 to 2005.

Nsibirwa served as the Head of Retail and Marketing at Commercial Microfinance Limited from July 2005 to October 2006. Nsibirwa transitioned to the banking sector and held the position of Head of Marketing at DFCU Bank from November 2006 to May 2010. Later served as a Managing Partner at Weaver Options from July 2010 to March 2011.

She served as the Head of Marketing and Communications at Vision Group from February 2011 to February 2019. Notably, she assumed a role as the Chairman of the Uganda Media Owners Association (UMOA) from November 2016 to December 2018. Nsibirwa became the Managing Partner at Urge Uganda from March 2019 to June 2022. Previously, she held the position of managing director at Ayiva Consulting Solutions since June 2022 before taking on the role of as the managing director of Nation Media Group Uganda on 22 December 2023.

== Other considerations ==
Nsibirwa currently serves as a board member in various organizations, including the Uganda Marketers Society since 2020, The Innovation Village since October 2023, the African Centre for Media Excellence since March 2021 (Board Chair), Monitor Publications Ltd since May 2022, and Greenhill Academy Ltd since June 2021.

== Awards ==
In August 2024, Susan emerged 5th among Uganda’s 100 Leading and Most Admired CEOs. She was also a National Medal Recipient (Diamond Jubilee) on International Women’s Day 2020, an award handed over by President Yoweri Museveni.
