= Joyce Mpanga =

Ugandan politician (1934–2023)

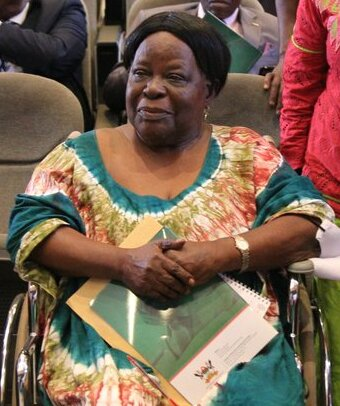

Member of the Lukiiko
- In office 2009–2023

Member of the Parliament of Uganda
- In office 1996–2001

Minister of State for Primary Education
- In office 1989–1992

Minister of Women in Development
- In office 1988–1989

Personal details
- Born: Joyce Masembe; 22 January 1934 Mityana, Protectorate of Uganda
- Died: 18 November 2023 (aged 89)

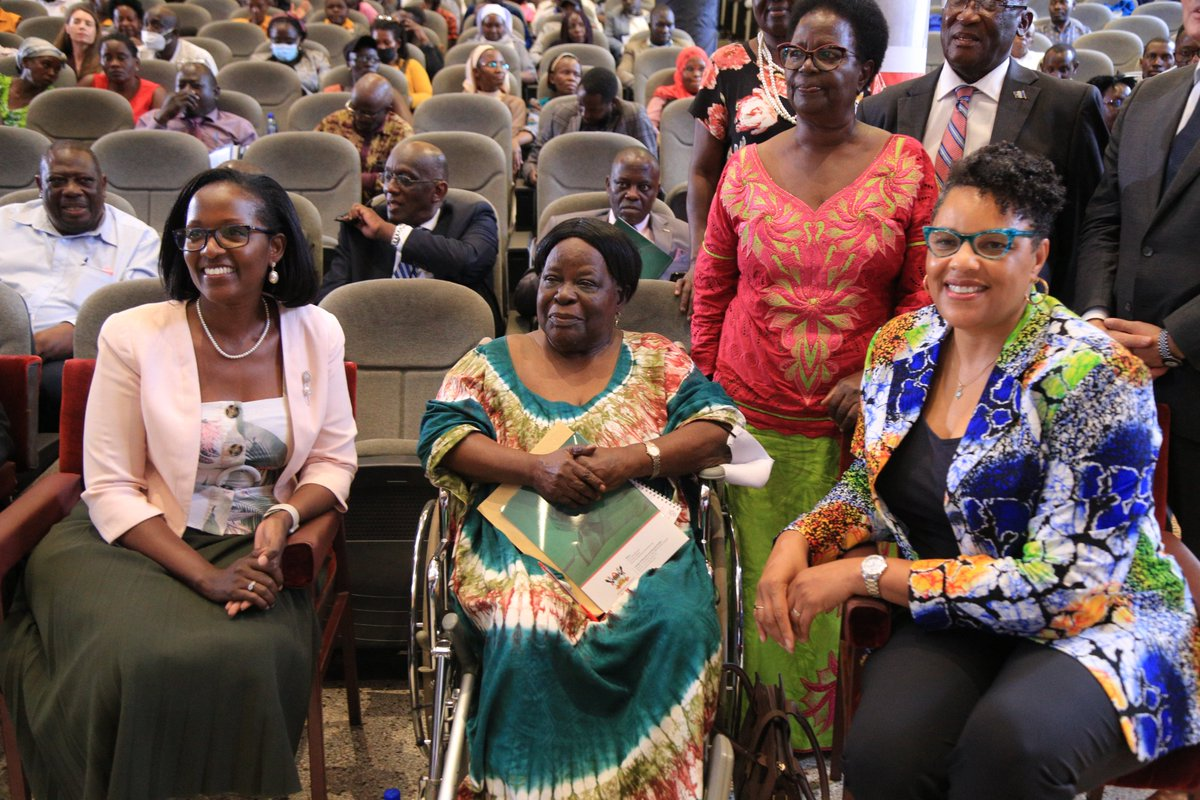
Amb.Brown with Hon. Mpanga

Joyce Rovincer Mpanga (née Masembe; 22 January 1934 – 18 November 2023) was a Ugandan politician and member of the Lukiiko from 2009. Mpanga was the Minister of Women in Development from 1988 to 1989 and the Minister of State for Primary Education from 1989 to 1992. Outside of the cabinet of Uganda, Mpanga was a Member of Parliament from 1996 to 2001 for Mubende District.

== Early life and education ==
Mpanga was born on 22 January 1934 in Mityana, Uganda and attended Gayaza High School. After graduating from Makerere College in 1958, she went to the University of London for a Bachelor of Arts and Indiana University Bloomington for her Master of Science in 1962.

== Career ==
Mpanga began her career as a teacher at Makerere College in 1958 and deputy headmistress of Gayaza High School in 1962. During her time in Makerere, Mpanga was elected onto the Uganda Legislative Council in 1960. Mpanga left for England in exile a year after the 1966 attack of Lubiri and returned to Uganda in 1972. While in England, she was an elementary school teacher.

In 1988, Mpanga became Uganda's first Minister of Women in Development and was succeeded by Gertrude Byekwaso Lubega. The following year, she was named Minister of State for Primary Education and held this position until 1991. Apart from serving in the cabinet of Uganda, Mpanga was also a Member of Parliament for the Mubende District from 1996 to 2001. In between her political positions, she took part in the rewriting of the Constitution of Uganda in 1995. In 2009, Mpanga became a member of the Lukiiko for Buwekula and was a representative of women for Buganda's parliament since 2011.

== Personal life ==
Mpanga was married with two children. Her grandson is a rapper and spoken word artist George the Poet.

Mpanga died on 18 November 2023, at the age of 89.
