= Martin Luther Nsibirwa =

- Born: 1883
- Died: 5 September 1945 (aged 61–62); Namirembe Cathedral
- Citizenship: Ugandan
- Occupations: Colonial Administrator, Prime Minister of Buganda Kingdom (Katikiro)
- Years active: 1929 to 1941 and July-September 1945
- Children: Rhoda Kalema, Janet Nsibirwa Mdoe, and 22 others
- Parents: Munyagwa (father); Bulyaba Namusoke (mother)

Martin Luther Nsibirwa MBE was a Ugandan colonial administrator (Member of the Order of the British Empire) and the Katikkiro (Prime Minister) of Buganda Kingdom. He served in this position twice in 1929 to 1941 and in July to September, 1945. He was known for being a pioneer leader and cornerstone of Uganda's heritage.

== Early life and education ==
Martin Luther Nsibirwa was born in 1883 at Kirindi in Bugerere county to Kiwanuka Kiwana - son of Munyagwa of the Nvuma Clan and Bulyaba Priscilla Namusoke of the Mpindi clan. He fathered 24 children, including Rhoda Kalema who was the Deputy Minister of Public Service from 1989 to 1991. Nsibirwa did not receive any formal education but taught himself how to read and write. He later on became a clerk, sub county chief, county chief, treasurer and twice the prime minister (Katikkiro) of Buganda Kingdom. His early years were shaped by a commitment to education, he attended Missionary schools where he excelled, demonstrating an aptitude for leadership and a keen interest in the welfare of his community.

Martin raised a family during a period of significant social change and ensured that his children received quality education that was available at the time, instilling in them the same values that had guided his own life. With the coaching and mentorship in traditional governance he received from Sir Apollo Kaggwa, Martin progressed in leadership.

== Career ==
In the 1920s and 30's, Martin Luther Nsibirwa rose through the ranks of colonial administrative structure where he was appointed to the Legislative council of Uganda. He was one of the First Africans to hold that position which earned him respect from both African and European leaders for his integrity and intelligence.

Martin participated in the British campaign in Tanganyika during World War I and later financed Ugandan volunteers fighting in World War II. Administratively, he rose from Gombolola chief of Mutuba VI to Saza chief of Bugerere in 1922, acting Saza chief of Ssingo (1924), treasurer (Omuwanika) in 1928 and Katikkiro of Buganda in 1929.

As a Katikkiro (prime minister) of Buganda Kingdom, he modernized the kingdom's administration while preserving its cultural heritage. He championed infrastructure projects, educational initiatives and agricultural development.

Nsibirwa signed a document in 1945 that no one was willing to sign, offering Buganda land to the colonial government to expand Makerere College into a university.

== Death ==
On the morning of September 5^{th},1945, Martin Luther Nsibirwa was assassinated as he arrived for morning prayers at Namirembe Cathedral. He was killed for his role in acquiring land for expansion of Makerere college, by an ex- king's African serviceman, who was arrested, tried, and convicted for Nsibirwa's murder.

== See also ==
- Rhoda Kalema, daughter
- Janet Nsibirwa Mdoe, daughter
- Susan Nsibirwa, granddaughter
