= William S. Kalema =

Ugandan chemical engineer and business executive

William Samson Kalema
- Born: William Samson Kalema; 17 June 1952 (age 74); Mulago, Kampala, Uganda
- Education: Emmanuel College, Cambridge (Bachelor of Science); University of Cambridge (Master of Science); California Institute of Technology; Doctor of Philosophy
- Occupations: Chemical engineer and business consultant
- Years active: 1978–present
- Title: Managing Director BDO East Africa

William Samson Kalema, is a Ugandan chemical engineer, business consultant and entrepreneur, who serves as the managing partner of BDO East Africa, "a professional firm that offers audit, accounting, tax and business advisory services to private and public sector clients", in the countries of the East African Community and Ethiopia.

== Background and education ==
Kalema was born at Mulago, in Kampala, Uganda's capital city. After attending primary school locally, he was admitted to Kings College Budo, where he completed his middle and high school education. He obtained his High School Diploma from Budo.

He holds a Bachelor of Science degree and a Master of Science degree, both in chemical engineering and both awarded by the University of Cambridge, in the United Kingdom. His Doctor of Philosophy degree, also in chemical engineering, was obtained from the California Institute of Technology (Caltech), in Pasadena, California, United States, in 1984.

== Career ==
As of December 2020, his career stretches back over more than four decades. Between 1974 until 1978, he served as a Metallurgical Engineer in the copper mining industry, based in the Zambian city of Ndola. He also served as a research engineer and business analyst at the DuPont Company, based in the state of Delaware, United States, serving in that capacity between 1984 ad 1992.

In 1992, he returned to Uganda and became a consultant to government, businesses and development agencies. He has, in the past and continues, as of December 2020, to serve on a number of boards of national, regional and international organizations. Past board positions are listed in the next section of this article. As of time of writing, he is a member of the following boards:

1. Chairman, Board of Directors, Old Mutual Life Assurance Uganda
2. Director, Multichoice Uganda,
3. Director, Electro-Maxx Uganda Limited
4. Director, Interswitch East Africa
5. Director, African Seed Investment Fund
6. Board Member, Bank of Uganda, Since 2010.

== Past board positions ==
He has served on the following boards in the past.

1. UK Commission for Africa set up by UK Prime Minister Tony Blair to develop a long-term strategy for international support for Africa's sustainable development, 2005
2. Chairman, Uganda Manufacturers Association (UMA), 2000–2002
3. Board member Uganda Manufacturers Association, 1994–2000
4. Committee Chairman, UMA Economic Sub-Committee, 1997–2000
5. Board Chairman, Uganda Investment Authority (UIA), 1998–2007
6. Member of Uganda's high-level Presidential Investors Round Table, 2004–2006 and 2009–2011
7. Board Chairman, DFCU Bank, 1998–2007
8. Board member DFCU Group, 1998–2012.
9. Trustee, Shell Foundation, 2005–2015,
10. Trustee and former Executive Chairman of the Kilimo Trust, 1997–2017
11. Trustee, Investment Climate Facility for Africa, 2007–2017
12. Chairman, Board of Trustees, Makerere Female Scholarship Foundation,
13. Chairman, Board of Directors, Uganda Gatsby Trust
14. Member of the Investment Committee of the Africa Enterprise Challenge Fund, managed by Alliance for a Green Revolution in Africa (AGRA), 2007–2013
15. Director, African Agricultural Capital & Chair of the African Agricultural Capital Fund I
16. Director, East African Breweries Limited, 2000–2009
17. Chairman, Board of Directors, Uganda Breweries, 2004–2009.

== Professional associations ==
1. Member; American Institute of Chemical Engineers (AIChE)
2. Member; Sigma Xi Scientific Honour Society

== See also ==
- Economy of Uganda
- COMESA
