= Nubians (Uganda) =

People who traditionally live in northern Uganda

Ugandan Nubians
Regions with significant populations
- Uganda: 28,772 (2014)

Languages
- KiNubi, English

Religion
- Islam

The Ugandan Nubians, alternatively known as Nubis or Nubi, are a people who traditionally live in northern Uganda, and generally include those who identify as Nubians. In addition, the Nubian identity is also linked to ethnic, linguistic, cultural, and societal elements, but these do not apply to all Ugandan Nubians.

In 2009, it was estimated that around 15,000 Nubians live in Uganda, with one of their main population centres in the town of Bombo. They are recognized as a native ethnic group by the Constitution of Uganda. In addition, a distinct people of Nubians with a related history live in Kenya. The Kenyan Nubis number 21,319 people according to the latest 2019 census.

== Nubian identity ==
In general, the Nubian identity has been intimately linked to Uganda's West Nile region, to Islam, and to military service. In addition, Nubians were traditionally associated with the Nubi language (KiNubi), a variant of trade Arabic based on Sudanese Arabic. Nubian men have traditionally practised ritual scarring, with three parallel facial marks being seen as Nubian symbol. This marker probably descends from the brands given to some Sudanese slaves during the 19th century.

Experts such as Paul Nugent have argued that the Ugandan Nubians are hard to define, as they are "an extremely fluid category". The Nubians were traditionally regarded by Europeans and many Ugandans as the descendants of Emin Pasha's mostly Muslim slave soldiers who fled to Uganda after being defeated by Mahdist Sudanese forces in the 1880s. Accordingly, the name "Nubian" or "Nubi" stems from the historical region of Nubia in northern Sudan. Despite the Nubian name, the earliest Ugandan Nubians hailed from South Sudan and South Kordofan. As the Nubians were seen as martial people by the British and preferred as recruits for the British colonial army, many northern Ugandans adopted a Nubian identity when they intended to join the military. This trend continued after Uganda's independence, especially under the rule of President Idi Amin who favored Nubians in the Uganda Army. Amin himself stated that members of different tribes could become Nubians. Migrants from neighboring Sudan who enlisted in the Uganda Army adopted a Nubian identity, although native Ugandan Nubians in Bombo, Kitgum, and Gulu resented them as foreign mercenaries. According to expert Mark Leopold, the Nubian identity was an "elective, strategic, and potential alternative ethnicity" for people from the West Nile region before 1979. Even Amin's British advisor Bob Astles adopted the traditional Nubian scars.

Many Nubians brought to Uganda for military purposes eventually settled in towns and cities. They worked petty jobs, becoming manual labourers, house servants, taxi drivers, nightguards, mechanics, or provided other services to the wealthy and middle classes. Due to their subordinate economic status and Muslim religious identity, they were generally looked down upon by the Bantu Christians in the cities and constituted a bloc of the urban poor. Many were drawn to military and police service under Amin as it offered opportunities for economic advancement.

As a result of their connection with Emin Pasha's slave soldiers, the colonial military, and Amin's government, the Nubians have been associated by other Ugandans as well as Europeans with violence. As a result, Nubians have become the target of discrimination and racist violence following the collapse of Amin's regime during the Uganda–Tanzania War. Some were dispossessed and fled to neighboring countries, including Kenya, Sudan, and Zaire. Many did not return from exile until after Yoweri Museveni seized power in 1986. Some people of Nubian ancestry actively identify themselves with different ethnicities to avoid discrimination.
