= List of companies of Liberia =

Location of Liberia

Liberia is a country on the West African coast. Liberia means "Land of the Free" in Latin. The Central Bank of Liberia is responsible for printing and maintaining the Liberian dollar, which is the primary form of currency in Liberia. Liberia is one of the world's poorest countries, with a formal employment rate of 15%. GDP per capita peaked in 1980 at US$496, when it was comparable to Egypt's (at the time). In 2011, the country's nominal GDP was US$1.154 billion, while nominal GDP per capita stood at US$297, the third-lowest in the world. Historically, the Liberian economy has depended heavily on foreign aid, foreign direct investment and exports of natural resources such as iron ore, rubber and timber.

== Notable firms ==
This list includes notable companies with primary headquarters located in the country. The industry and sector follow the Industry Classification Benchmark taxonomy. Organizations which have ceased operations are included and noted as defunct.

Notable companies Status: P=Private, S=State; A=Active, D=Defunct
Name	Industry	Sector	Headquarters	Founded	Notes	Status	
AccessBank Liberia	Financials	Banks	Monrovia	2009	Commercial bank	P	A
Air Liberia	Consumer services	Airlines	Monrovia	1974	Airline, defunct 1990	P	D
Cable Consortium of Liberia	Telecommunications	Fixed line telecommunications	Monrovia	2010	Terminal for ACE	P	A
Central Bank of Liberia	Financials	Banks	Monrovia	1999	Central bank	S	A
First International Bank (Liberia)	Financials	Banks	Monrovia	2005	Commercial bank	P	A
Global Bank Liberia	Financials	Banks	Monrovia	2005	Commercial bank	P	A
International Bank	Financials	Banks	Monrovia	1960	Commercial bank	P	A
LAMCO	Basic materials	General mining	Monrovia	1955	Mining, defunct 1989	P	D
Liberia Airways	Consumer services	Airlines	Monrovia	?	Airline, defunct 2006	P	D
Liberia Broadcasting System	Consumer services	Broadcasting & entertainment	Monrovia	1960	Government-owned broadcaster, defunct 1990	P	D
Liberia Cement Corporation (Cemenco)	Industrials	Building materials & fixtures	Monrovia	1968	Cement	P	A
Liberia Telecommunications Corporation	Telecommunications	Fixed line telecommunications	Monrovia	1973	Government-owned	S	A
Liberian Bank for Development and Investment	Financials	Banks	Monrovia	1961	Commercial bank	P	A
LoneStar Airways	Consumer services	Airlines	Monrovia	2004	Airline, defunct 2006	P	D
Lonestar Cell	Telecommunications	Mobile telecommunications	Monrovia	2000	Wireless, part of MTN Group (South Africa)	P	A
National Port Authority	Industrials	Transportation services	Monrovia	1921	Government-owned ports	S	A
Satgur Air Transport	Consumer services	Airlines	Monrovia	2004	Airline, defunct 2006	P	D

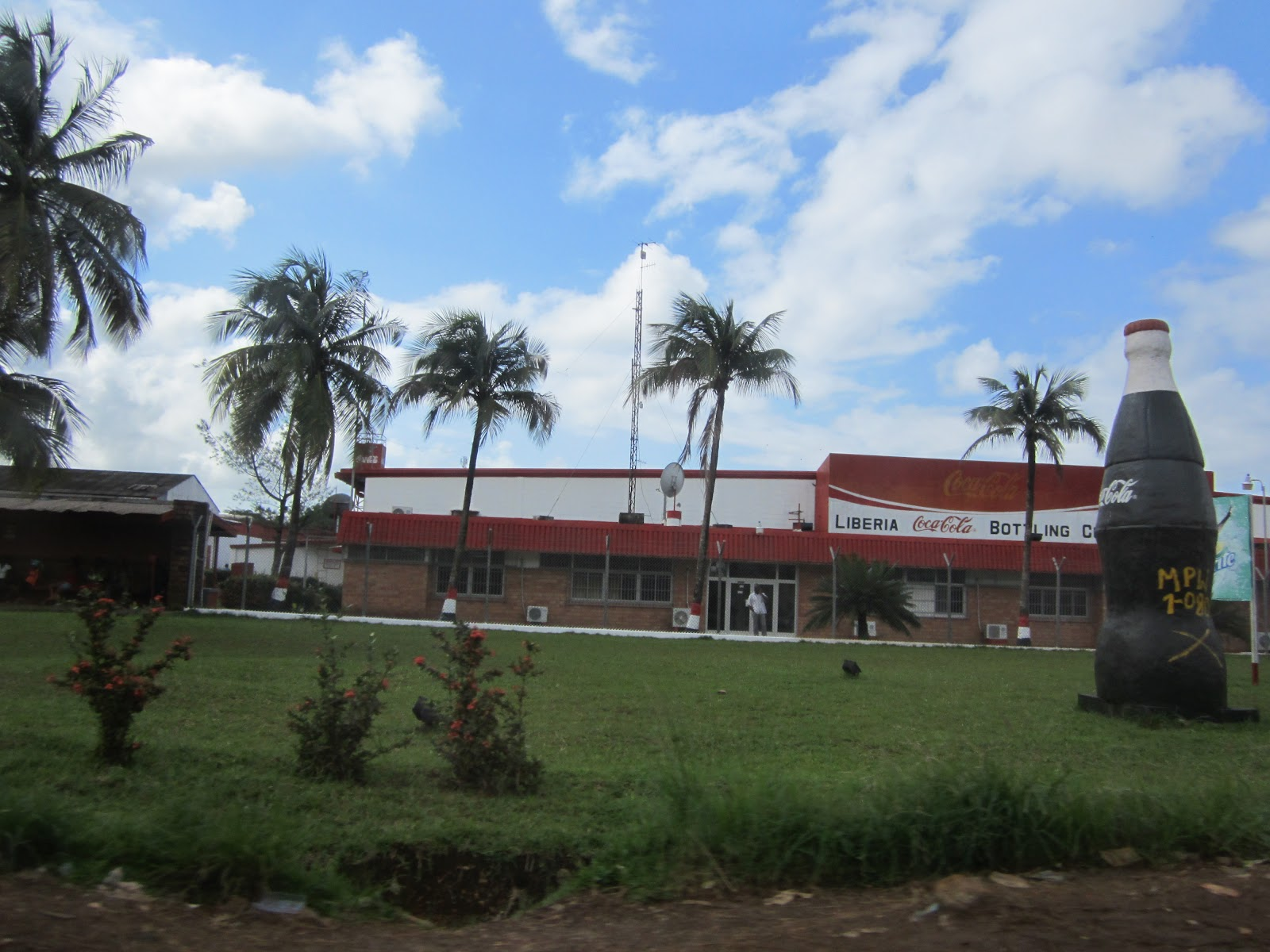
Bottling plant in Monrovia.

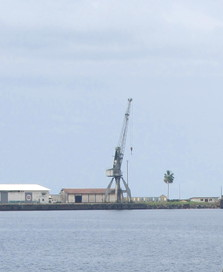
Port of Buchanan, Liberia.

== See also ==
- Liberian companies
