= Bank PHB Group =

- Company type: Public
- Traded as: NGX: PHB
- Industry: Banking
- Predecessor: Platinum Bank Plc; Habib Nigeria Bank Plc
- Founded: 2005
- Defunct: August 5, 2011
- Fate: Insolvency
- Successor: Keystone Bank Limited
- Headquarters: Victoria Island, Lagos, Nigeria
- Key people: Abdul Lateef Kolawole Abiola; Chairman; Cyril Chukwumah; Group CEO
- Products: Banks, Mortgages Investments
- Total assets: US$3.6 billion+ (2009)
- Website: www.bankphb.com

Bank PHB Group, also known as Platinum Habib Bank Group, was a financial services organization in West Africa and East Africa. The Group's headquarters was located on Victoria Island in Lagos, Nigeria, with subsidiaries in Nigeria, the Gambia, Liberia, Sierra Leone and Uganda. Bank PHB Group was one of the largest financial services organizations in Africa, with an estimated asset base in excess of US$3.6 billion, as of December 2009.

== Member companies ==
The member companies of Bank PHB Group included:

- Bank PHB - Lagos, Nigeria
- Bank PHB Gambia - Banjul, Gambia
- Bank PHB Liberia - Monrovia, Liberia
- Bank PHB Sierra Leone - Freetown, Sierra Leone
- Insurance PHB Limited - Lagos, Nigeria
- Mortgages PHB Limited - Lagos, Nigeria
- Orient Bank - Kampala, Uganda
- PHB Asset Management - Lagos, Nigeria
- PHB HealthCare Limited - Lagos, Nigeria
- Platinum Capital Limited - Lagos, Nigeria
- Spring Bank Plc. - Lagos, Nigeria

== Failure and closure ==
On August 5, 2011, the Central Bank of Nigeria revoked the operating licence of BankPHB, along with those of Afribank and Spring Bank, as they had not shown capacity to recapitalize before the September 30, 2011 recapitalization deadline.

Keystone Bank Limited was formed on August 5, 2011, by taking over all the assets (including subsidiaries) and liabilities of the now defunct BankPHB, whose commercial banking license had been revoked on the same day.

Following the revocation of the banking licence and takeover of BankPHB, the Nigeria Stock Exchange placed the Group's shares on technical suspension and finally delisted on September 5, 2011.
