= FIBS =

Fibs or FIBS may refer to:

- Fibonacci numbers
- Finnish Business and Society
- Finnish International Baccalaureate Society
- Fibs (album)

== See also ==
- Fib (disambiguation)
