= Athelqueen =

Athelqueen has been used as a name for a number of ships of the Athel Line.

- SS Athelqueen, built by Furness Shipbuilding, torpedoed and sunk by Italian submarine Enrico Tazzoli on 15 March 1942
- MV Athelqueen (1942), built by Harland and Wolff as Empire Benefit. In service 1945–55
- MV Athelqueen (1960), built by Barclay, Curle & Co. In service 1966–71, latterly as Anco Queen
- MV Athelqueen (1977), built by Davie Shipbuilders. In service 1977–80
