= Ifiesimama Sekibo =

Nigerian banker, entrepreneur and philanthropist (born 1965)

- Born: April 18, 1965; Port Harcourt, Rivers State, Nigeria
- Education: Harvard Business School; University of Science & Technology, Port Harcourt
- Occupations: Banker, entrepreneur
- Known for: CEO Heritage Bank (Nigeria)

Ifiesimama “Ifie” Sekibo (born April 18, 1965) is a Nigerian banker, entrepreneur and philanthropist who is currently the chief executive officer of Heritage Bank (Nigeria), a leading retail financial institution in Nigeria. He was before this appointment the Executive Vice-chairman of International Energy Insurance Plc, IEI before emerging as the pioneer MD/CEO of Heritage Bank. In September 2021, he was named the most reputable bank CEO in Africa alongside Yemisi Edun, CEO of First City Monument Bank.

== Early life and education ==
Sekibo was born in Port Harcourt, Rivers State. He attended both primary and secondary schools in Port Harcourt before proceeding to the University of Science & Technology, Port Harcourt where he obtained a degree in accountancy. He attended the Harvard Business School between 2006 and 2009. He holds a PhD Credit Management from the London Post Graduate Credit Management College, UK, an affiliate of American University, London. In 2002, Sekibo became a fellow of the Institute of Chartered Accountants of Nigeria.

== Career ==
Sekibo began his career as an Auditor with the Rivers State government's Audit department in 1988. He thereafter joined KPMG in Lagos as an Audit Trainee in 1989 before moving to ELF Nigeria ltd as a Cost Controller. Between 2000 and 2002, he became a member of the Executive Management of Rims Merchant Bank, while also serving as Financial Controller and Head of Administration in Monipulo Limited (Petroleum Development) from 1999 to 2002. In 2003, Sekibo emerged as the Group Managing Director of International Energy Insurance, a foremost insurance company in Nigeria, and led his team to acquire Global Assurance Company Limited, previously under the technical management of the National Insurance Commission. The company under his leadership also undertook successful capital raise and was listed on Nigerian Stock Exchange. In 2009, he led another team of professionals which nurtured the rebirth of the erstwhile Société Générale Bank in Nigeria and began to operate as Heritage Banking Company Limited. In 2014, it acquired Enterprise Bank Ltd to become Heritage Bank Ltd.

=== Heritage Bank ===
As the Managing Director/CEO of Heritage Bank (Nigeria), Sekibo positioned the bank to become the most innovative banking service provider in Nigeria. The bank has won several awards under his leadership including Best SME Bank in Nigeria by Capital Finance International (CFI) 2018, Agriculture Bank of the Year at Nigeria Agriculture Awards (NAA) 2018, and many other awards. Currently, the bank has 127 branches and 202 automated banking centers with over 350 ATMs in all states of the federation and the Federal Capital Territory (FCT) of Nigeria.

== Awards and achievements ==
- Man Making a Difference, Goal Attainment Made Easy (GAME), 2014
- Leader of the Year Award, Leadership Clinic GOTNI, 2016
