= Ndejje University =

Private Christian university in Uganda

Ndejje University (NDU)
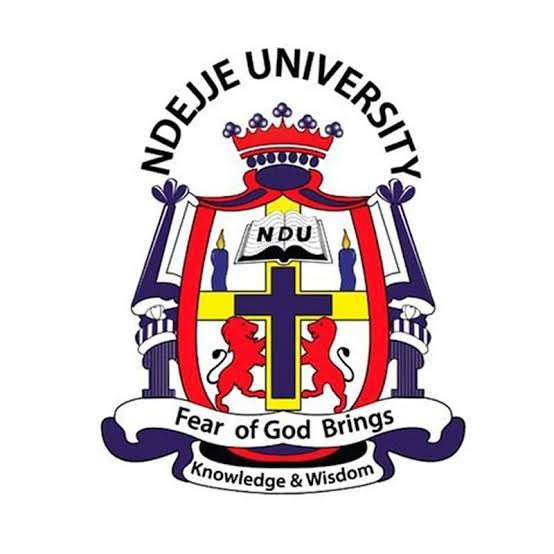
- The official logo of Ndejje Universities as of 2019
- Motto: Fear of God brings Knowledge and Wisdom
- Type: Private
- Established: 1992; 34 years ago
- Chancellor: Dr. Hannington Mutebi
- Vice-Chancellor: Rev. Can. Prof. Olivia Nassaka Banja
- Students: 12000+ (2024)
- Location: Ndejje, Uganda; 00°36′44″N 32°28′34″E
- Campus: Both Urban and Peri urban campuses
- Website: Homepage
- Location within Uganda

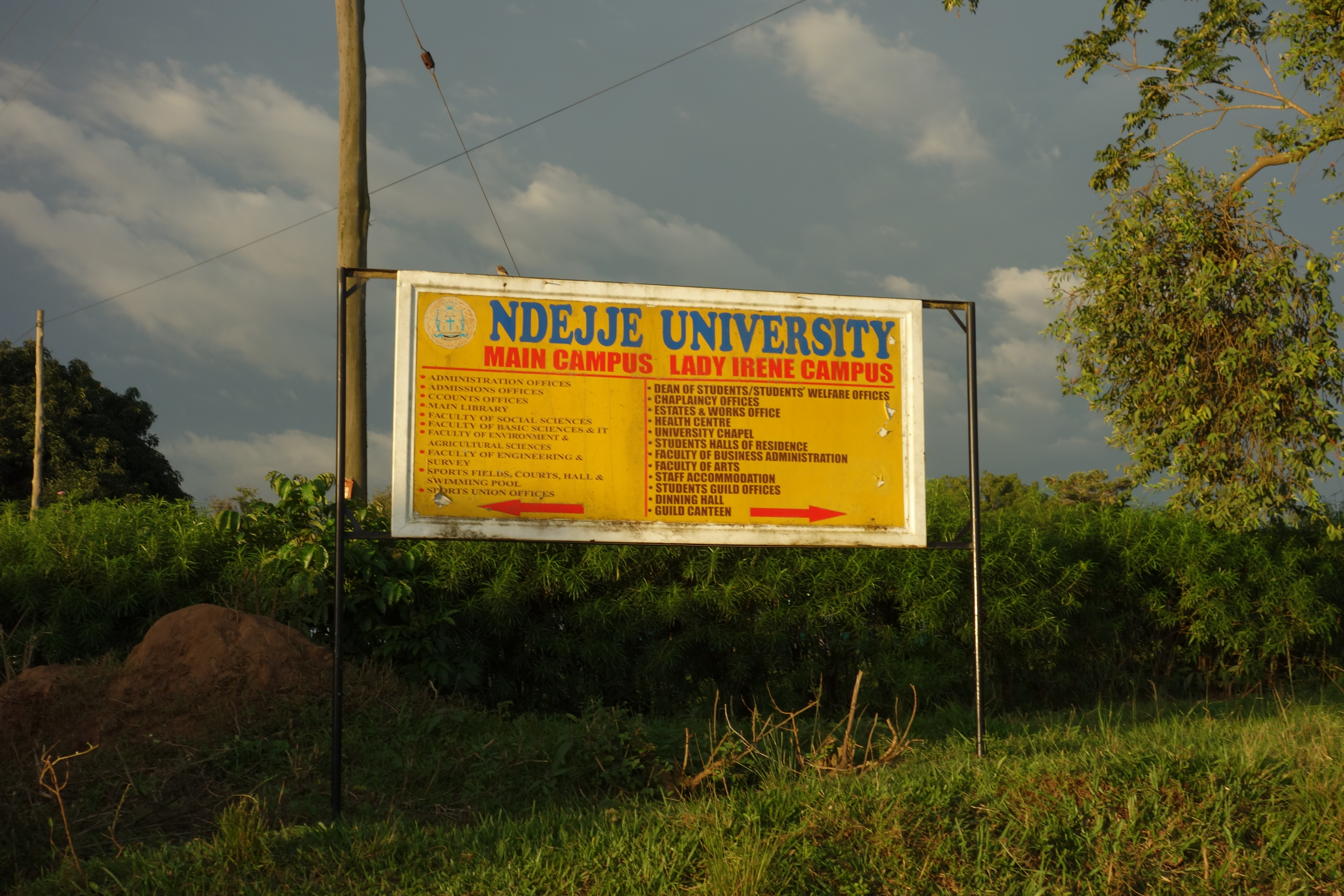
Entry Sign Ndejje University Uganda

Ndejje University is a private, multi-campus, Christian university and the oldest private university in Uganda.

== Location ==
The university has two separate campuses located on 200 acres (81 ha), in a rural setting at Ndejje Hill, about 14 kilometres (9 mi), north-west of Bombo Town, in Luweero District, in the Buganda Region of Uganda. The main campus of the university lies adjacent to the Lady Irene Camps in Ndejje. This location lies approximately 42 kilometres (26 mi), by road, north of Kampala, the capital city of Uganda. Ndejje Hill is located about 8 kilometres (5.0 mi), northwest of Bombo, the nearest large town.

== History ==
In 1995, "The Christian University of East Africa" with some government involvement was annexed by the Anglican Diocese of Luweero, in the Province of the Church of Uganda. The name of the university was changed to Ndejje University. In 1998, the institution received recognition as a tertiary level institution of higher learning by the government of Uganda through the Ugandan Ministry of Education and Sports.

Ownership of the university was expanded to include all six dioceses of the Church of Uganda in the Buganda Region. Ndejje University was issued a University Charter by the government of Uganda in 2009. The university offers undergraduate and postgraduate programs that are recognized nationally and Internationally.

== Campuses ==
As of April 2020, the university maintains the following campuses:

1. The main campus, located on Ndejje Hill, in Luweero District
2. Lady Irene Campus, also located on Ndejje Hill. Together, the two campuses in Ndejje occupy 200 acres (81 ha)
3. The Kampala Campus, located at 151 Balintuma Road, Mengo, in Kampala, Uganda's capital city.
4. Nakasongola Campus: the university is in the process of acquiring 400 acres (160 ha) in Nakasongola District, to house the research facility in renewable energy and environmental management.

== Faculties ==
As of April 2020, there were seven constituent faculties of the university and one school.

1. Faculty of Arts
2. Faculty of Business Administration and Management
3. Faculty of Basic Sciences and IT
4. Faculty of Education
5. Faculty of Engineering
6. Faculty of Environment and Agricultural Sciences
7. Faculty of Social Sciences.
8. Ndejje University Graduate School

== Programs ==
Ndejje University offers both undergraduate and postgraduate courses including both diploma and degree programs.

=== Postgraduate programs ===
The following is a partial list of the postgraduate programs on offer.

- Master of Business Administration
- Master of Science in Information Systems
- Master of Education
- Master of Development Studies
- Master of Arts in Community Participation and Strategic Management Studies
- Master of Science in Marketing
- Master of Science in Finance
- Master of Science in Procurement and Supply Chain Management
- Master of Science in Human Resource Management
- Post Graduate Diploma in Business Administration
- Post Graduate Diploma in Institutional Management
- Post Graduate Diploma in Sports Science
- Post Graduate Diploma in Physical Education & Sports Management
- Post Graduate Diploma in Sports Nutrition & Management
- Post Graduate Diploma in Education

=== Undergraduate degree programs ===
This is partial list of undergraduate courses offered at Ndejje University.

- Bachelor of Business Administration
- Bachelor of Commerce
- Bachelor of Science in Human Resource Management
- Bachelor of Science in Accounting
- Bachelor of Science in Finance
- Bachelor of Science in Marketing
- Bachelor of Procurement Management
- Bachelor of Computer Science
- Bachelor of Business Computing & Information Management
- Bachelor of Public Relations Management
- Bachelor of Education
- Bachelor of Arts with Education
- Bachelor of Science with Education
- Bachelor of Business Education
- Bachelor of Education - Institutions Management
- Bachelor of Development Studies
- Bachelor of Guidance and Counseling
- Bachelor of Arts in Social Work and Social Administration
- Bachelor of Arts in Community Development
- Bachelor of Journalism and Mass Communication
- Bachelor of Sports Science and Management
- Bachelor of Science in Sustainable Natural Resources
- Bachelor of Science in Plantation Forestry
- Bachelor of Forest Science & Environmental Management
- Bachelor of Sports Science
- Bachelor of Sports Nutrition & Management
- Bachelor of Physical Education & Sports Management
- Bachelor of Science in Chemical Engineering
- Bachelor of Science in Civil Engineering
- Bachelor of Science in Electrical Engineering
- Bachelor of Science in Mechanical Engineering
- Bachelor of Survey and Land Information Systems

=== Undergraduate diploma programs ===
This is a partial list of diploma courses offered at Ndejje University.

- Diploma in Primary Education
- Diploma in Secondary Education
- Diploma in Computer Science
- Diploma in Commercial Arts & Design Technology
- Diploma in Guidance & Counseling
- Diploma in Business Administration
- Diploma in Education Institutions Management
- Diploma in Sports Science
- Diploma in Sports Nutrition & Management
- Diploma in Physical Education & Sports Management
- Diploma in Nursery Teaching. Day, Evening and In-service programs

=== Advanced certificate programs ===
These are some of the certificate programs offered at Ndejje University.

- Advanced Certificate in Early Childhood Education
- Advanced Certificate in Nursery Teaching
- Advanced Grade III Teachers Certificate
- Advanced Certificate in Business Administration.
- HEC certificate in social works and sciences

== Notable alumni ==
- Aloysius Mukasa, MP Rubaga South (2021- )
- Asinansi Nyakato, Member of Parliament for Hoima City
- Cathy Patra, dancer
- Francis Zaake, Member of Parliament representing Mityana municipality
- Husina Kobugabe, badminton player
- Julius Oketta, senior commander of Uganda People's Defence Force
- Mark Muyobo, acting Chief Executive Officer at NCBA Bank Uganda
- Susan Lakot, Member of Parliament representing Uganda People's Defence Force
- Samuel Ibanda Mugabi, Journalist and president of the Uganda Parliamentary Press Association

== See also ==
- List of universities in Uganda
- List of Business Schools in Uganda
- Education in Uganda
- Bombo
- Church of Uganda
- Buganda Region
