= Ifeyinwa Osime =

Nigerian corporate lawyer and corporate governance practitioner

- Born: Nigeria
- Education: University of Benin (LL.B); London School of Economics (LL.M)
- Occupations: Lawyer, corporate governance practitioner
- Known for: Chairman, Access Bank Plc

Ifeyinwa Osime is a Nigerian legal practitioner and corporate governance practitioner. She is the chairman of the board of directors of Access Bank Plc, Nigeria.

== Early life and education ==
Osime obtained a Bachelor of Laws (LL.B) degree from the University of Benin and was called to the Nigerian Bar in 1987. She later earned a Master of Laws (LL.M) degree in Commercial and Corporate Law from the London School of Economics. She has undertaken executive education programmes at institutions including INSEAD, IMD, Harvard Business School, the Massachusetts Institute of Technology, and Stanford University.

== Career ==
Osime began her professional career at the Nigeria Reinsurance Corporation and later joined African Development Insurance Company Limited, where she served as company secretary and assistant general manager, administration and legal.

She is a partner at McPherson Legal Practitioners, where she provides advisory services in corporate and commercial law and corporate governance.

In November 2019, Osime was appointed an independent non-executive director of Access Bank Plc. She chaired the bank's Human Resources and Sustainability Committee and the Governance, Nomination and Remuneration Committee.

In February 2026, she was appointed chairman of the board of directors of Access Bank Plc, succeeding Paul Usoro following the completion of his regulatory tenure.

== Other board and professional roles ==
Osime has served on the boards of Coronation Insurance Plc and Coronation Life Assurance Company Limited. She has also held a non-executive director position at Bank PHB, now Keystone Bank Limited.

She is a member of the Nigerian Bar Association, Women Corporate Directors Nigeria, and the Chartered Institute of Directors Nigeria.
