= EBL =

EBL may refer to:

== Finance ==
- Eastern Bank Ltd (Bangladesh), a private commercial bank in Dhaka, Bangladesh
- Eastern Bank Ltd (historic), a British bank founded in 1909
- Enterprise Bank Limited, a commercial bank in Nigeria
- Equity Group Holdings Limited, a financial services holding company in the African Great Lakes region

== Science and technology ==
- Electronic back light, a lighting technique for displays and instrument gauges
- Electron-beam lithography
- Electronic brakeforce limitation
- Explanation-based learning, a form of machine learning
- Extragalactic background light, all the accumulated radiation in the universe

== Sports ==
- Energa Basket Liga, Polish Basketball League name due sponsorship reasons in 2018-2023
- English Basketball League, for professional, semi-professional, and amateur clubs from England and Wales
- Era Basket Liga, Polish Basketball League name due sponsorship reasons in 2003-2005

== Other ==
- Enquiry-based learning
- Erbil International Airport, in Iraq
- Eswatini Beverages Ltd
- European Bridge League, with headquarters in Lausanne, Switzerland
- Evidence-based legislation
- Evidence-based librarianship
