= Heritage Bank (disambiguation) =

Heritage Bank may refer to:

- Heritage Bank, a former Australian mutual bank, now part of People First Bank
- Heritage Bank (Kentucky), an American bank with branches in Northern Kentucky
  - Heritage Bank Center
- Heritage Banking Company Limited, a Nigerian commercial bank

== See also ==
- Key Bank Center, also known as the Heritage Bank Building
