= Mark Muyobo =

Ugandan accountant and corporate executive

- Born: c. 1973 (age 52–53); Uganda
- Education: Ndejje University; Heriot-Watt University; Association of Chartered Certified Accountants; The London Institute of Banking & Finance
- Occupations: Accountant, Businessman and Corporate Executive
- Years active: 2002 – present
- Known for: Leadership & Business expertise
- Title: Acting Chief Executive Officer at NCBA Bank Uganda

Mark Muyobo (born c. 1973) is a Ugandan accountant, businessman and incumbent Chief Executive Officer at NCBA Bank Uganda. He took up his current assignment in December 2021. He replaced Anthony Ndegwa, a Kenyan national, who left the bank.

Prior to his current assignment, he was an executive director at NCBA Bank Uganda, the result of a merger between NC Bank Uganda and Commercial Bank of Africa (Uganda), which received regulatory approval from the Bank of Uganda in June 2020.

== Background and education ==
Muyobo was born in Uganda c. 1973. After attending local primary and secondary schools, he was admitted to Ndejje University, graduating with a Bachelor of Business Administration degree, majoring in Accounting.

He went on to obtain a Master of Business Administration degree, awarded by the Heriot-Watt University, in Edinburgh, Scotland. In addition, he obtained an Advanced Diploma in Credit Skills Development, Corporate, Finance, and Securities Law, awarded by the ifs School of Finance (today The London Institute of Banking & Finance). He is also a Fellow of the Association of Chartered Certified Accountants of the United Kingdom.

== Career ==
Muyobo's banking career goes bank over 20 years. He started out at DFCU Bank, as a relationship manager, in 2002, serving there for five years. He then joined Barclays Bank and was seconded to Absa Capital, in Johannesburg. After 6 months in South Africa, he returned to Uganda and was appointed "Head of Multinationals & Large Corporates", at Barclays Bank Uganda (today Absa Bank Uganda Limited). Over a period of ten years, Muyobo served in various high level management positions, including as Head of Asset Finance, Head of Business Banking and as Vice President, Global Corporates.

In October 2018, he was appointed as executive director of NCBA Bank, Uganda. In December 2021, he was appointed Acing CEO and managing director, at the same bank.

== See also ==
- Sam Ntulume
