= List of airlines of Liberia =

This is a list of airlines of Liberia.

== Active ==
There are no active airlines in Liberia.

== Defunct ==
| Airline | Image | IATA | ICAO | Callsign | Commenced operations | Ceased operations | Notes |
|---|---|---|---|---|---|---|---|
| ADC Liberia | | | | | 1993 | 1995 | |
| Air Cargo Liberia | | | | | 1991 | 1997 | Operated Antonov An-32 |
| Air Cargo Plus | | | | | 2001 | 2003 | Operated Boeing 707, Douglas DC-8-55 |
| Air Cess Liberia | | | ACS | | 1995 | 2006 | Operated An-8, An-12, An-24, Il-18, Il-76, Boeing 707, Tu-154, Yak-40 |
| Air Liberia | | NL | ALI | NOVEMBER LIMA | 1974 | 1979 | |
| Ales Airlines | | | | | 1997 | 2001 | Operated Dassault Falcon, Yak-40 |
| Arax Airlines | | | | | 1978 | 1999 | |
| Bridge Airlines | | | BGE | | 2005 | 2006 | |
| Coastal Airways | | | | | 1981 | 1983 | Operated Boeing 707, Sud Aviation Caravelle |
| Cougar Airways | | | | | 1997 | 1997 | Operated Douglas DC-8 |
| Ducor Air Transport (DATCO) | | | | | 1965 | 1974 | Merged with Liberian National Airways to form Air Liberia |
| Excel Air Services | | | EXI | EXCEL AIR | 2000s | 2006 | |
| Interfly Ales Airlines | | | | | 1997 | 2001 | Operated Yak-40 |
| International Air Services | | | IAX | | 2003 | 2005 | |
| Jet Cargo Liberia | | | JCL | | 1982 | 2003 | Operated Boeing 707-309C |
| Liberia Airways | | | LBA | LIBERIA AIRWAYS | 2006 | 2006 | |
| Liberia World Airlines (trading as LWA, LWA Air Cargo, or Liberia World Airways) | | | | | 1979 | 2001 | Cargo airline. Operated Douglas C-54E, Bristol Britannia, Douglas DC-8-55F, Boeing 707-300 |
| Liberian International Airways | | | | | 1954 | 1955 | Operated Douglas DC-3, de Havilland Dragon Rapide |
| Liberian National Airlines | | NL | | | 1965 | 1974 | Merged with Ducor Air Transport to form Air Liberia. Operated Douglas DC-3 |
| Liberian National Airways | | | | | 1949 | 1965 | Renamed to Liberian National Airlines. Operated Douglas DC-3, de Havilland Dragon Rapide |
| Liberian Overseas Airways | | | | | 1983 | 1983 | |
| LoneStar Airways | | | LOA | | 1999 | 2006 | |
| Midair | | | MLR | MIDLINER | 2005 | 2005 | Operated Boeing 707 |
| Occidental Airlines | | | OCC | OCCIDENTAL | 1995 | 2006 | Operated Boeing 707 |
| Santa Cruz Imperial | | | SNZ | | 1996 | 2002 | Acquired by Flying Dolphin Airlines and renamed Dolphin Air |
| SATCO | | 2S | TGR | | 2003 | 2006 | |
| Satgur Air Transport | | 2S | TGR | SATGURAIR | 2003 | 2006 | |
| Simon Air | | 8U | SIQ | | 1998 | 2001 | |
| SkyAir Cargo | | | TAW | | 1990 | 2000 | Operated Boeing 707 |
| Weasua Air Transport | | | WTC | | 1993 | 2006 | |

== See also ==
- List of airports in Liberia
