= Bank PHB =

- Company type: Public company
- Traded as: NGX: PHB
- Industry: Banking
- Predecessor: Platinum Bank Plc; Habib Nigeria Bank Plc
- Founded: 2005
- Defunct: August 5, 2011
- Successor: Keystone Bank Limited
- Headquarters: Lagos, Lagos State, Nigeria
- Key people: Kola Abiola, Chairman; Cyril Chukwumah, Managing Director and Chief Executive Officer
- Products: Loans, Credit Cards, Savings, Investments, Mortgages
- Revenue: ▲US$220 million (2008)
- Total assets: US$6 billion+ (2008)
- Website: Homepage

Bank PHB, formerly known as Platinum Habib Bank, was a commercial bank in Nigeria. The bank was the fifth largest financial services provider in Nigeria. The bank's assets were valued in excess of US$6 billion.

Key Officers

Francis Atuche- CEO /MD of Bank PHB

== Bank PHB Group ==
Bank PHB was a member of the Bank PHB Group, headquartered in Lagos, Nigeria, with subsidiaries in the Gambia, Liberia, Nigeria, Sierra Leone and Uganda.

== History ==
Bank PHB was formed in 2005 by the merger between Platinum Bank Plc and Habib Nigeria Bank Plc. Since its inception, the bank pursued a strategy of expansion by the acquisition and creation of subsidiaries within and without its home country of Nigeria. (See Bank PHB Group).

== Failure and closure ==
On August 5, 2011, the Central Bank of Nigeria revoked the operating licence of BankPHB along with that of Afribank and Spring Bank as they had not shown capacity and ability to recapitalize before the September 30, 2011 recapitalization deadline.

Keystone Bank Limited was created on August 5, 2011, by taking over all the assets (including subsidiaries) and liabilities of the now defunct BankPHB, whose commercial banking license had been revoked on the same day.

== See also ==
- Bank PHB Group
- List of banks in Nigeria
- Orient Bank
- Keystone Bank Limited
