= Samuel Ibanda Mugabi =

- Born: Luuka District, Uganda
- Other name: Sam Ibanda Mugabi
- Education: Makerere University (B.Ed.; M.A. Peace and Conflict Studies); Ndejje University (Journalism)
- Occupation: Journalist
- Employer: NBS TV
- Known for: President of the Uganda Parliamentary Press Association (UPPA)
- Title: President, Uganda Parliamentary Press Association
- Term: 2022–present
- Parent: Margaret Ibanda Nandhego (mother)

Samuel Ibanda Mugabi, also known as Sam Ibanda Mugabi, is a Ugandan journalist and president of the Uganda Parliamentary Press Association.

== Early life and educational background ==
Mugabi was born in Luuka District to Margaret Ibanda Nandhego, and his father was a reverend in the Anglican Church under the Busoga Diocese. In 2004, he joined Makerere University, where he studied education at the undergraduate level. After completing his bachelor’s degree, he enrolled at Ndejje University to study journalism. He later returned to Makerere University to pursue a Master’s degree in Peace and Conflict Studies.

== Career ==
Mugabi is a parliamentary reporter and producer at NBS TV in Uganda. He is the President of the Uganda Parliamentary Press Association (UPPA), serving for his second term in a position he first held in 2022. He is also a member of the Media Council of Uganda board.
