= Flag of convenience =

Registering a ship in a foreign country

Flag of convenience (FOC) refers to a business practice whereby a ship's owners register a merchant ship in a ship register of a country other than that of the ship's owners, and the ship flies the civil ensign of that country, called the flag state. The term is often used pejoratively, and although common, the practice is sometimes regarded as contentious.

Each merchant ship is required by international law to be registered in a registry created by a country, and a ship is subject to the laws of that country, which are used also if the ship is involved in a case under admiralty law. A ship's owners may elect to register a ship in a foreign country so as to avoid the regulations of the owners' country, which may, for example, have stricter safety standards. They may also select a jurisdiction to reduce operating costs, avoiding higher taxes in the owners' country and bypassing laws that protect the wages and working conditions of mariners. The term "flag of convenience" has been used since the 1950s. A registry which does not have a nationality or residency requirement for ship registration is often described as an open registry. Panama, for example, offers advantages such as easier registration (often online), the ability to employ cheaper foreign labour, and an exemption on income taxes.

The modern practice of registering ships in a foreign country began in the 1920s in the United States when shipowners seeking to serve alcohol to passengers during Prohibition registered their ships in Panama. Owners soon began to perceive advantages in terms of avoiding increased regulations and rising labor costs and continued to register their ships in Panama even after Prohibition ended. The use of open registries steadily increased, and in 1968, Liberia grew to surpass the United Kingdom with the world's largest ship register.

Traditional maritime nations, mainly from Europe, responded to this practice with creation of so-called "second registers": open registries, using national flags or flags of semi-sovereign offshore dependencies. That process begun in 1984 with the Isle of Man registry created as a second UK register. Soon after Norway and the Netherlands followed this practice adopting Norwegian International Ship Register (NIS) and Netherlands Antilles respectively. France established in 1989 Kerguelen Islands Register (replaced by International French Register (Registre International Français - RIF in 2005) and Germany (Federal Republic of) created German International Register (GIS) in the same year. The last two registries are still (in 2025) considered as flags of convenience.

As of 2025, more than half of the world's merchant ships in terms of deadweight tonnage are registered in open registries.

== Background ==
Open registries have been criticised, mainly by trade union organisations based in developed countries, especially those in the European Union, United States, Japan, Canada, or the United Kingdom. One criticism is that shipowners who want to hide their ownership may select a flag-of-convenience jurisdiction which enables them to be legally anonymous. Some ships with flags of convenience have been found engaging in crime, offering substandard working conditions, and negatively impacting the environment, primarily through illegal, unreported and unregulated fishing. Prior to the implementation of the International Convention on Tonnage Measurement of Ships, 1969, shipowners may have selected a jurisdiction with measurement rules that reduced the certified gross register tonnage of a ship, to reduce subsequent port of call dock dues. Such was a consideration when Carnival Cruise Line changed the flag of the RMS Empress of Canada in 1972 to that of Panama. In 2011, Cunard Line registered all its ships in Bermuda, which, besides other considerations, enabled its ship captains to marry couples at sea. Weddings at sea are described as a lucrative market.

Maritime industry practitioners and seafarers from other countries contend that this is a natural product of globalisation. Supporters of the practice, however, point to economic and regulatory advantages, and increased freedom in choosing employees from an international labour pool. Publications from as early as 1962 argue that shipowners from developed countries use the practice to be competitive in a global environment.

In 2010 in a message connected to the World Maritime Day, the Secretary-General of the International Maritime Organization gave recognition to the present status of the open registries and noted that the seafarers from some developing countries are providing a major source of foreign currency to their home economies:

The development of open registries for ships has given the shipping industry the flexibility to recruit its manpower from alternate sources, with the result that developing and newly industrialized countries now provide the majority of seafarers for the entire global fleet – not just for the ships flying their own country's flag.

=== Legal context ===
International law requires that every merchant ship be registered in a country. The country in which a ship is registered is its flag state, and the flag state gives the ship the right to fly its civil ensign. A ship operates under the laws of its flag state, and these laws are used if the ship is involved in an admiralty case. A ship's flag state exercises regulatory control over the vessel and is required to inspect it regularly, certify the ship's equipment and crew, and issue safety and pollution prevention documents. The organization which actually registers the ship is known as its registry. Registries may be governmental or private agencies.

=== Reasons for adopting a flag of convenience ===
The reasons for choosing an open register are varied and include tax avoidance, the ability to avoid national labor and environmental regulations, and the ability to hire crews from lower-wage countries. National or closed registries typically require a ship be owned and constructed by national interests, and at least partially crewed by its citizens. Conversely, open registries frequently offer on-line registration with few questions asked. The use of flags of convenience lowers registration and maintenance costs, which in turn reduces overall transportation costs. The accumulated advantages can be significant, for example in 1999, 28 of the American company SeaLand's fleet of 63 ships were foreign-flagged, saving the company up to US$3.5 million per ship every year.

=== Accidents and reform ===
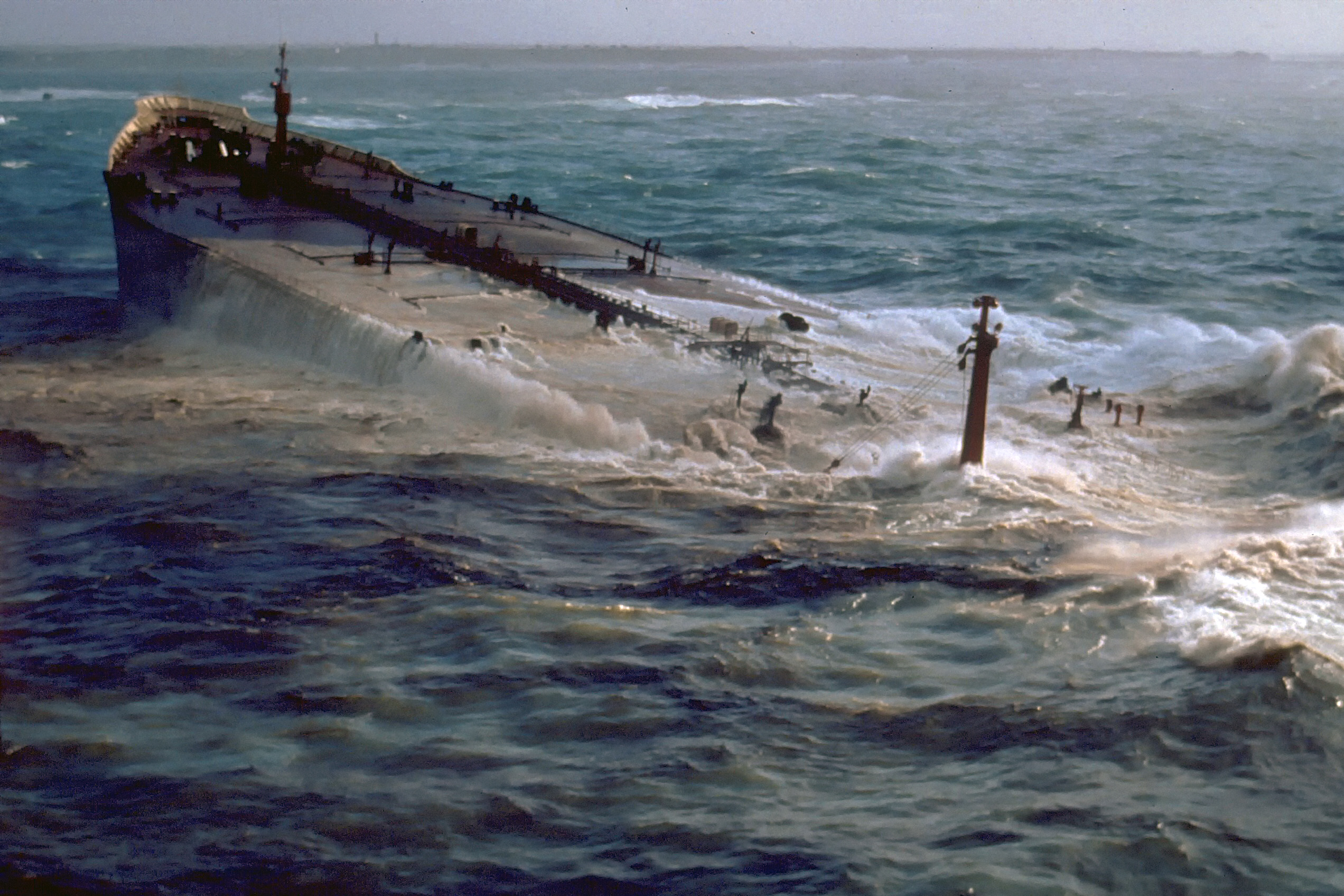
The sinking of Amoco Cadiz led to concerted ship inspections by port states.

The environmental disaster caused by the 1978 sinking of the MV Amoco Cadiz, which flew the Liberian flag, spurred the creation of a new type of maritime enforcement. Resulting from strong political and public outcry over the Amoco Cadiz sinking, fourteen European nations signed the 1982 Paris Memorandum of Understanding on Port State Control or Paris MOU. Under port state control, ships in international trade became subject to inspection by the states they visit. In addition to shipboard living and working conditions, these inspections cover items concerning the safety of life at sea and the prevention of pollution by ships. In cases when a port state inspection uncovers problems with a ship, the port state may take actions including detaining the ship. In 2015, member states of the Paris MOU conducted 17,858 inspections with deficiencies, which resulted in 595 detained vessels and 11 banned. Member states of the Tokyo Memorandum of Understanding conducted 17,269 ship inspections in 2015, recording 83,606 deficiencies which resulted in 1,153 detentions.

The principle that there be a genuine link between a ship's owners and its flag state dates back to 1958, when Article 5(1) of the Geneva Convention on the High Seas also required that "the state must effectively exercise its jurisdiction and control in administrative, technical and social matters over ships flying its flag." The principle was repeated in Article 91 of the 1982 treaty called the United Nations Convention on the Law of the Sea and often referred to as UNCLOS. In 1986, the United Nations Conference on Trade and Development attempted to solidify the genuine link concept in the United Nations Convention on Conditions for Registration of Ships. The Convention for Registration of Ships would require that a flag state be linked to its ships either by having an economic stake in the ownership of its ships or by providing mariners to crew the ships. To come into force, the 1986 treaty requires 40 signatories whose combined tonnage exceeds 25% of the world total. Between 1986 and 2012, 24 countries signed or ratified the treaty. As of 2026, it has not entered into force.

== History ==
Merchant ships have used false flags as a tactic to evade enemy warships since antiquity, and examples can be found from as early as the Roman era through to the Middle Ages. Following the American Revolutionary War, merchantmen flying the flag of the fledgling United States quickly found it offered little protection against attack by Barbary pirates – many responded by seeking to transfer their registry back to Great Britain. The use of false flags was frequently used as a ruse de guerre by the British during the Napoleonic Wars and the United States during the War of 1812. During the mid-19th century, slave ships flew various flags to avoid being searched by British anti-slavery fleets. In the American Civil War, it was reported that the combined effect of the simultaneous Taiping Rebellion and the raids of CSS Alabama in the Pacific had increased shipping insurance prices to the point that nearly all American ships in China resorted to sail under the flags of Portugal, Prussia, or Peru.

The Belen Quezada, in August 1919, was the first foreign ship to be re-registered in the Panamanian registry, and was employed in running illegal alcohol between Canada and the United States during Prohibition. The modern practice of registering ships in foreign countries to gain economic advantage originated in the United States in the era of World War I, though the term "flag of convenience" did not come into use until the 1950s.

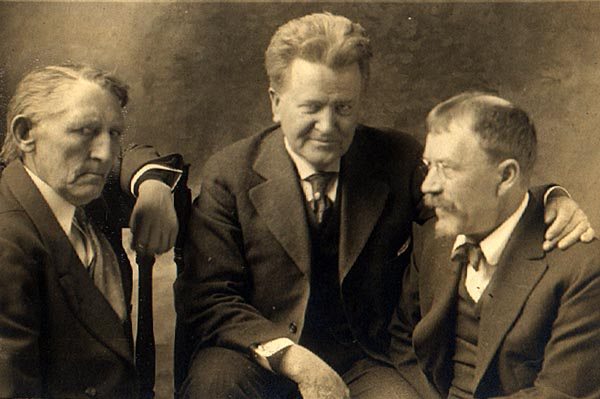
The engineers of the Seamen's Act, from left to right, maritime labor leader Andrew Furuseth, Senator Robert La Follette, and muckraker Lincoln Steffens, circa 1915

Between 1915 and 1922, several laws were passed in the United States to strengthen the United States Merchant Marine and provide safeguards for its mariners. During this period, U.S.-flagged ships became subject to regular inspections undertaken by the American Bureau of Shipping. This was also the time of Robert LaFollette's Seamen's Act of 1915, which has been described as the "Magna Carta of American sailors' rights". The Seamen's Act regulated mariners' working hours, their payment, and established baseline requirements for shipboard food. It also reduced penalties for disobedience and abolished the practice of imprisoning sailors for the offense of desertion. Another aspect of the Seamen's Act was enforcement of safety standards, with requirements on lifeboats, the number of qualified able seamen on board, and that officers and seamen be able to speak the same language. These laws put U.S.-flagged vessels at an economic disadvantage against countries lacking such safeguards, and ships started to be re-registered in Panama's open registry from 1919. In addition to sidestepping the Seamen's Act, Panamanian-flagged ships in this early period paid sailors on the Japanese wage scale, which was much lower than that of western merchant powers. In the early phase of World War II the transfer of American-owned ships to the Panama registry was sanctioned by the United States government so that they could be used to deliver materials to Britain without dragging the United States, as a neutral, unintentionally into war.

Timeline
Date	Event
1919	m/v "Belen Quezada" flagged in Panama
1948	ITF FOC Campaign begins
1949	m/v "World Peace" flagged in Liberia
1969	Liberia becoming the largest registry
1976	FOC first mentioned in international convention (ILO C147)
1988	Marshall Islands starts own registry
1999	Panama is the largest registry
2009	Panama, Liberia & Marshall Islands account for 40% of world's tonnage
2010	Open registries addressed by IMO

The Liberian open registry, founded in 1948, was the brainchild of Edward Stettinius, who had been Franklin D. Roosevelt's Secretary of State during World War II. Stettinius created a corporate structure that included The Liberia Corporation, a joint-venture with the government of Liberia. The corporation was structured so that 25% of its revenue would go to the Liberian government, another 10% went to fund social programs in Liberia, and the remainder returned to Stettinius' corporation. The Liberian registry was created at a time when Panama's registry was becoming less attractive for several reasons including its unpopularity with the U.S. labor movement and European shipping concerns, political unrest in Panama, and increases in its fees and regulations.

On 11 March 1949, Greek shipping magnate Stavros Niarchos registered the first ship under the Liberian flag, World Peace. When Stettinius died in 1949, ownership of the registry passed to the International Bank of Washington, led by General George Olmsted. Within 18 years, Liberia grew to surpass the United Kingdom as the world's largest register.

Due to Liberia's 1989 and 1999 civil wars, its registry eventually fell second to Panama's flag of convenience, but maritime funds continued to supply 70% of its total government revenue. After the civil war of 1990, Liberia joined with the Republic of the Marshall Islands to develop a new maritime and corporate program. The resulting company, International Registries, was formed as a parent company, and in 1993 was bought out by its management. After taking over the Liberian government, Americo-Liberian warlord Charles Taylor signed a new registry contract with the Liberian International Ship and Corporate Registry, commonly known as LISCR. LISCR was one of the few legal sources of income for Taylor's regime. Liberia's registry is operated from Virginia, United States.

To counteract class hopping, in 2009 the International Association of Classification Societies (IACS) established a Transfer of Class Agreement (TOCA).

Ships of the Russian war-time shadow fleet transporting sanctioned cargo (especially crude oil) frequently change their flag registrations. Since 2022, this practice has given new importance in global shipping to previously insignificant registries like those of Gabon, Eswatini (itself landlocked with no open water access), the Comoro Islands, and Guinea-Bissau. According to a report of the Atlantic council "They are so permissive that virtually any vessel can register, even ones turned down by other flag-of-convenience-states." A May 2026 analysis of the US Treasury's Specially Designated Nationals (SDN) list found that of 1,445 OFAC-designated vessels with a recorded flag, 33.6% (486 vessels) fly classic flag-of-convenience registries — led by Panama (260 vessels), Liberia (63), and Palau (55) — while only 2.3% fly a flag from a transparent public beneficial-ownership register (the EU member states, the UK, Norway, or Iceland).

As of 2025, the open registries of Panama, Liberia, and Marshall Islands accounted for approximately half of the entire world fleet by deadweight tonnage, maintaining roughly the same proportion for over a decade.

== Extent of use ==
The International Transport Workers' Federation (ITF) is the biggest campaigner against FOC since 1948, and maintains a list of registries it considers to be flags of convenience. In developing the list, the ITF takes into account "ability and willingness of the flag state to enforce international minimum social standards on its vessels," the "degree of ratification and enforcement of ILO Conventions and Recommendations," and "safety and environmental record". As of November 2025, the list includes 48 registries.

Since 2009, Liberia, Panama and the Marshall Islands are the world's three largest registries in terms of deadweight tonnage (DWT). As of 1 January 2024, these three nations registered 17,752 ships of 1,000 DWT and above, for a total of 1,041,986,000 DWT: more than 46% of the world's shipborne carrying capacity.

The following table gives the distribution between the 10 largest world registries in terms of tonnage (millions dwt):

Registry	FOC as per ITF	2025	2024	2023	2022	2021
Liberia	Yes	424.1	408.7	378.6	335.7	299.8
Panama	Yes	371.3	380.9	366.7	350.9	344.6
Marshall Islands	Yes	305.5	308.6	299.9	290.3	274.3
Hong Kong		203.0	200.3	200.2	208.1	205.0
Singapore		152.3	140.7	134.8	131.7	136.3
China		137.1	139.7	133.2	120.5	111.0
Malta	Yes	113.2	102.5	109.2	114.8	115.8
Bahamas	Yes	70.5	72.4	72.0	73.1	74.3
Greece		53.5	56.1	58.7	61.6	64.4
Japan		43.8	42.6	41.7	40.0	39.1

Source: UNCTAD (estimates based on data supplied by Clarkson Research Services). The data refer to the beginning of an indicated year.

In comparison, the total capacity of ships in the U.S. and U.K. registers as of 1 January 2024 is 13.2 mil. dwt and 11.1 mil. dwt respectively.

== Criticism ==
The drilling platform Deepwater Horizon flew a Marshallese flag of convenience.

There are a number of common threads found in criticisms of the flag of convenience system. One is that these flag states have insufficient regulations and that those regulations they do have are poorly enforced. Another is that, in many cases, the flag state cannot identify a shipowner, much less hold the owner civilly or criminally responsible for a ship's actions. As a result of this lack of flag state control, flags of convenience are criticized on grounds of enabling tax avoidance, providing an environment for conducting criminal activities, supporting terrorism, providing poor working conditions for seafarers, and having an adverse effect on the environment.

David Cockroft, former general secretary of the ITF, says:

Arms smuggling, the ability to conceal large sums of money, trafficking in goods and people and other illegal activities can also thrive in the unregulated havens which the flag of convenience system provides.

Panama has the largest maritime register, followed by Liberia. Landlocked Mongolia also has a major registry, as does Bolivia. Also, some registers are based in other countries. For example, Panamanian overseas consulates manage the documentation and collect registration fees, Liberia's registry is managed by a company in Virginia and Bahamas' from the City of London.

=== Concealed ownership ===
A ship's beneficial owner is legally and financially responsible for the ship and its activities. For any of a number of reasons, some justifiable and some suspicious, shipowners who wish to conceal their ownership may use a number of strategies to achieve that goal.

In jurisdictions that permit it, actual owners may establish shell corporations to be the legal owners of their ships, making it difficult, if not impossible, to track who is the beneficial owner of the ship. The 2004 Report of the UN Secretary General's Consultative Group on Flag State Implementation reported that "It is very easy, and comparatively inexpensive, to establish a complex web of corporate entities to provide very effective cover to the identities of beneficial owners who do not want to be known."

According to a 2003 report by the Organisation for Economic Co-operation and Development (OECD) report entitled "Ownership and Control of Ships", these corporate structures are often multi-layered, spread across numerous jurisdictions, and make the beneficial owner "almost impenetrable" to law enforcement officials and taxation. The report concludes that "regardless of the reasons why the cloak of anonymity is made available, if it is provided it will also assist those who may wish to remain hidden because they engage in illegal or criminal activities, including terrorists." The OECD report concludes that the use of bearer shares is "perhaps the single most important (and perhaps the most widely used) mechanism" to protect the anonymity of a ship's beneficial owner. Physically possessing a bearer share accords ownership of the corporation. There is no requirement for reporting the transfer of bearer shares, and not every jurisdiction requires that their serial numbers even be recorded.

Two similar techniques to provide anonymity for a ship's beneficial owner are "nominee shareholders" and "nominee directors". In some jurisdictions that require shareholder identities to be reported, a loophole may exist where the beneficial owner may appoint a nominee to be the shareholder, and that nominee cannot legally be compelled to reveal the identity of the beneficial owner. All corporations are required to have at least one director, however many jurisdictions allow this to be a nominee director. A nominee director's name would appear on all corporate paperwork in place of the beneficial owners, and like nominee shareholders, few jurisdictions can compel a nominee director to divulge the identity of beneficial owners. A further hurdle is that some jurisdictions allow a corporation to be named as a director.

=== Crime ===
Flag of convenience ships have long been linked to crime on the high seas. For example, in 1982, Honduras shut down its open registry operations because it had enabled "illegal traffic of all kinds and had given Honduras a bad name".

Ships registered by the Cambodia Shipping Corporation (CSC) were found smuggling drugs and cigarettes in Europe, breaking the Iraq oil embargo, and engaging in human trafficking and prostitution in Europe and Asia. In response to these activities, in 2000, Ahmad Yahya of the Cambodian Ministry of Public Works and Transport told industry publication Fairplay "We don't know or care who owns the ships or whether they're doing 'white' or 'black' business ... it is not our concern." Less than two years later, French forces seized the Cambodian-flagged, Greek-owned MV Winner for cocaine smuggling. Shortly after the seizure, Cambodian Prime Minister Hun Sen closed the registry to foreign ships, and Cambodia canceled its contract with CSC shortly thereafter.

The North Korean flag of convenience has also garnered significant scrutiny. In 2003, the North Korean freighter Pong Su reflagged to Tuvalu in the middle of a voyage shortly before being seized by Australian authorities for smuggling heroin into that country. That year, thirteen nations began monitoring vessels under the North Korean flag for "illicit cargos like drugs, missiles or nuclear weapon fuel". Following the US 2018 withdrawal from the Joint Comprehensive Plan of Action, Iran's ghost fleet is known to use flag hopping in order to smuggle oil out of the country.

=== Working conditions ===
In the accompanying material of the ILO's Maritime Labour Convention of 2006, the International Labour Organization estimated that at that time there were approximately 1,200,000 working seafarers across the world. This document goes on to say that when working aboard ships flagged to states that do not "exercise effective jurisdiction and control" over their ships that "seafarers often have to work under unacceptable conditions, to the detriment of their well-being, health and safety and the safety of the ships on which they work."

The International Transport Workers' Federation goes further, stating that flags of convenience "provide a means of avoiding labor regulation in the country of ownership, and become a vehicle for paying low wages and forcing long hours of work and unsafe working conditions. Since FOC ships have no real nationality, they are beyond the reach of any single national seafarers' trade union." They also say that these ships have low safety standards and no construction requirements, that they "do not enforce safety standards, minimum social standards or trade union rights for seafarers", that they frequently fail to pay their crews, have poor safety records, and engage in practices such as abandoning crewmen in distant ports.

=== Environmental effects ===
While flag of convenience ships have been involved with some of the highest-profile oil spills in history (such as the Maltese-flagged MV Erika, the Bahamian-flagged MV Prestige, the Marshallese-flagged Deepwater Horizon, and the Liberian-flagged SS Torrey Canyon, MV Amoco Cadiz and MV Sea Empress), the most common environmental criticism they face regards illegal fishing. These critics of the flag of convenience system argue that many of the FOC flag states lack the resources or the will to properly monitor and control those vessels. The Environmental Justice Foundation (EJF) contends that illegal, unreported and unregulated fishing (IUU) vessels use flags of convenience to avoid fisheries regulations and controls. Flags of convenience help reduce the operating costs associated with illegal fishing methods, and help illegal operators avoid prosecution and hide beneficial ownership. As a result, flags of convenience perpetuate IUU fishing which has extensive environmental, social and economic impacts, particularly in developing countries. The EJF is campaigning to end the granting of flags of convenience to fishing vessels as an effective measure to combat IUU fishing.

According to Franz Fischler, European Union Fisheries Commissioner,

The practice of flags of convenience, where owners register vessels in countries other than their own in order to avoid binding regulations or controls, is a serious menace to today's maritime world.

== Port state control ==
In 1978, a number of European countries agreed in The Hague to audit labour conditions on board vessels vis-a-vis the rules of the International Labour Organization. To this end, in 1982 the "Paris Memorandum of Understanding on Port State Control" (Paris MOU) was established, setting port state control standards for what is now twenty-six European countries and Canada.

Several other regional Memoranda of Understanding have been established based on the Paris model, including the "Memorandum of Understanding on Port State Control in the Asia-Pacific Region", typically referred to as the "Tokyo MOU", and organizations for the Black Sea, the Caribbean, the Indian Ocean, the Mediterranean, and Latin America. The Tokyo and Paris organizations generate, based on deficiencies and detentions, black-, white-, and grey-lists of flag states. The US Coast Guard, which handles port state control inspections in the US, maintains a similar target list for underperforming flag states.

PSC performance indicators (2025)
FOC as per ITF	% of world's tonnage	Paris MoU	Tokyo MoU	USCG Qualship 21
Liberia	17.4%	White list	White list	No
Panama	15.2%	Grey list	White list	No
Marshall Islands	12.5%	White list	White list	Yes
Malta	4.6%	White list	White list	Yes
Bahamas	2.9%	White list	White list	No
Cyprus	1.4%	White list	White list	No
Barbados	0.8%	White list	Grey list	Yes
Antigua and Barbuda	0.4%	White list	Grey list	No
Palau	0.3%	Black list	Black list	No
Bermuda	0.3%	White list	White list	Yes
Cameroon	0.2%	Black list	Black list	No
Cayman Islands	0.2%	White list	White list	Yes
all other FOCs	< 3%	—N/a	—N/a	—N/a

Sources: International Chamber of Shipping (ICS), Paris MoU, Tokyo MoU, USCG

Both Paris and Tokyo MoU-s maintain blacklists of low performing flags, but there are FOC and non-FOC registries among them.

Panama has a policy to reduce PSC detentions and to improve performance on Panamanian vessels.

The effectiveness of the port state control regime in correcting deficiencies is mitigated in some part by the practice of flag-hopping, in which shipowners and operators will rename their ships and acquire new vessel registrations in other jurisdictions in order to avoid detection and reduce the likelihood of being selected for port state control inspections.

== Ratification of maritime conventions ==
International regulations for the maritime industry are promulgated by agencies of the United Nations, particularly the International Maritime Organization and International Labour Organization. Flag states adopt these regulations for their ships by ratifying individual treaties. One common criticism against flags of convenience was that they allow shipowners to avoid these regulations by not ratifying important treaties or by failing to enforce them. Recent surveys (table on right side) shows that major FOC administrations comply with the international conventions. Only small percent of FOC tonnage belongs to flags, which are out of this process.

The International Chamber of Shipping (ICS) issues an annual report entitled the Shipping Industry Flag State Performance Table identifying the six "core" conventions representing a minimum level of maritime regulation, from the viewpoint of shipowners, as SOLAS, MARPOL, LL 66, STCW, MLC, and CLC/FUND92. With the exception of Eswatini, all 48 flags of convenience listed by ITF have ratified the STCW Convention, concerning standards of training, certification and watchkeeping for seafarers, and 23 of them have ratified all six. However, at least seventeen listed countries have not ratified all the remaining five conventions. To put this in context, over 50 flag states have not ratified all six conventions, including China and United States of America.

The Safety of Life at Sea (SOLAS) and Load Line (LL 66) conventions focus on shipboard safety issues. Originally developed in response to the sinking of RMS Titanic, SOLAS sets regulations on lifeboats, emergency equipment and safety procedures, including continuous radio watches. It has been updated to include regulations on ship construction, fire protection systems, life-saving appliances, radio communications, safety of navigation, management for the safe operation of ships, and other safety and security concerns. LL 66 sets standards for minimum buoyancy, hull stress, and ship's fittings, as well as establishing navigational zones where extra precautions must be taken.

The International Labour Organization Maritime Labour Convention, 2006 provides comprehensive rights and protection at work for seafarers, including requirements for minimum age, qualifications, hours of work and rest, medical care, complaint procedures, wage payments, and onboard living arrangements. The MLC replaced a number of earlier ILO Conventions including ILO147.

MARPOL and CLC/FUND92 relate to pollution. The International Convention for the Prevention of Pollution from Ships, 1973 (MARPOL), as modified by the Protocol of 1978, including Annexes I–VI" regulates pollution by ships, including oil and air pollution, shipboard sewage and garbage. The Civil Liability for Oil Pollution Damage (CLC) and International Fund for Compensation for Oil Pollution Damage (FUND92) together provide mechanisms to ensure compensation for victims of oil spills.

With the exception of Cameroon, each of the top twelve FOC registries by tonnage (see Port state control) are signatories to the major revisions of all six core maritime conventions.

== Wages ==
The United Nations Conference on Trade and Development, in its 2009 Report on Maritime Trade, states that shipowners often register their ships under a foreign flag in order to employ "seafarers from developing countries with lower wages". The Philippines and China supply a large percentage of maritime labor in general, and major flags of convenience in particular. In 2009, the flag-states employing the highest number of expatriate-Filipino seafarers were Panama, the Bahamas, Liberia and the Marshall Islands. That year, more than 150,000 Filipino sailors were employed by these four flags of convenience. In a 2006 study by the United States Maritime Administration (MARAD), sailors from the People's Republic of China comprised over 40% of the crews on surveyed ships flying the Panamanian flag, and around 10% of those flying the Liberian flag. The MARAD report referred to both China and the Philippines as "low cost" crewing sources.

The seafaring industry is often divided into two employment groups: licensed mariners including deck officers and marine engineers, and mariners that are not required to have licenses, such as able seamen and cooks, but are required to be certified. The latter group is collectively known as unlicensed mariners or ratings. Differences in wages can be seen in both groups, between "high cost" crewing sources such as the United States, and "low cost" sources such as China and The Philippines. However, salaries on flag of convenience ships are still far higher than median salaries of non-seafarers in these countries, in addition to income tax exemption of some seamen, particularly those from the Philippines.

For unlicensed mariners, 2009 statistics from the American Bureau of Labor Statistics give median earnings for able and ordinary seamen as US$35,810, varying from $21,640 (at the 10th percentile) to $55,360 (at the 90th percentile). This can be compared with 2006 statistics from the International Labour Organization, giving average yearly earnings for Filipino and Chinese able seamen around $2,000 to $3,000 per year (PHP9,900 per month and CNY3,071 per year). Among licensed mariners, American chief engineers earned a median $63,630, varying from $35,030 to $109,310 while their Filipino counterparts averaged $5,500 per year (PHP21,342 per month).

== See also ==
- Declaration recognising the Right to a Flag of States having no Sea-coast
- Tax haven
