= Ndejje =

- Map of Uganda showing the location of Ndejje
- Coordinates: 00°36′36″N 32°28′30″E
- Country: Uganda
- Region: Central Uganda
- District: Luweero District
- Elevation: 1,240 m (4,070 ft)
- Time zone: UTC+3 (EAT)

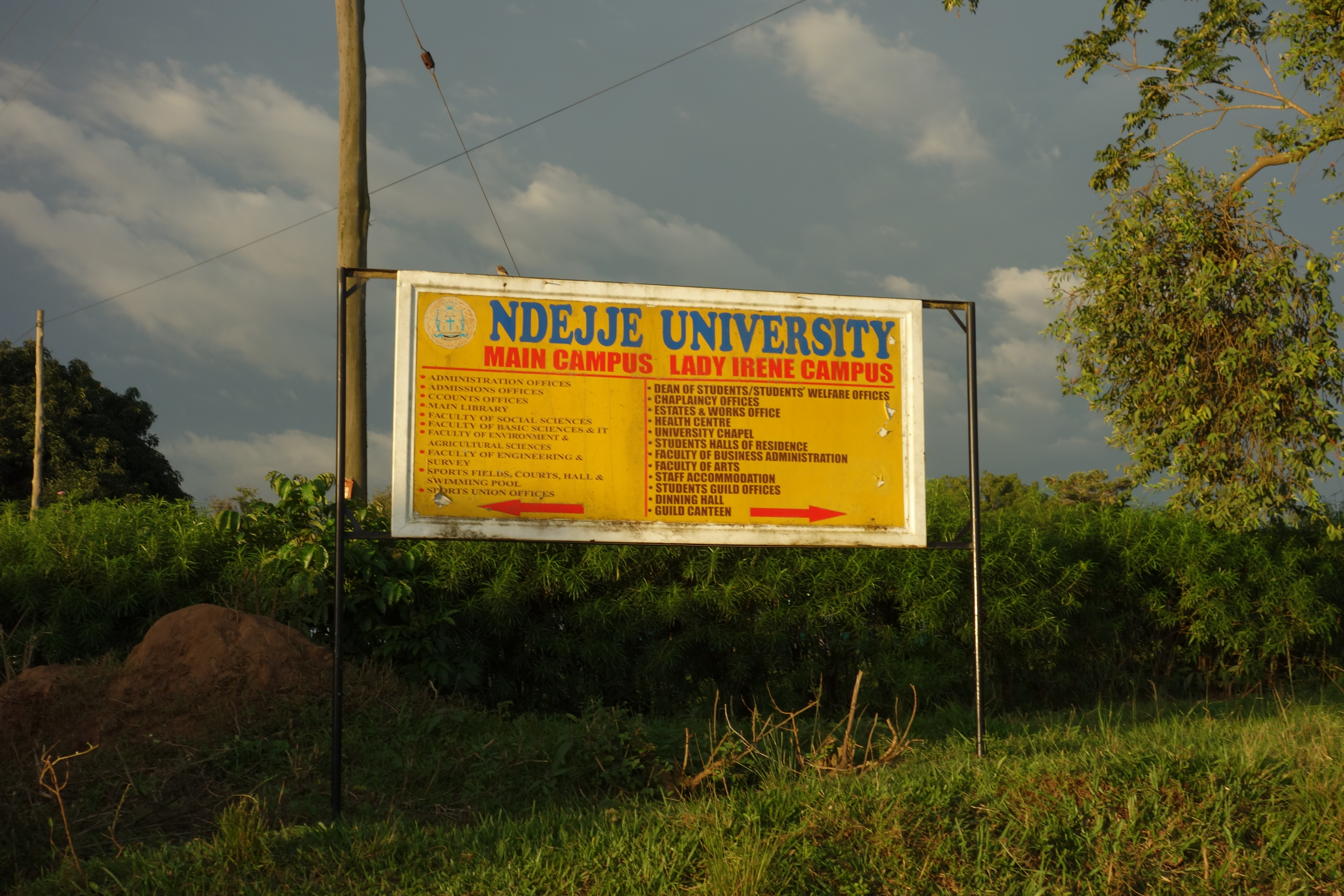
Ndejje Signpost in the areas of Ndejje

Ndejje is a hill in Central Uganda. The hill rises 1,240 metres (4,070 ft) above sea level. Ndejje also refers to the trading center that has developed along the southern slopes of Ndejje Hill.

== Location ==
Ndejje is located in Luweero District, approximately 42 kilometres (26 mi), by road, north of Kampala, Uganda's capital and largest city. This location lies approximately 8 kilometres (5.0 mi), by road, northwest of the town of Bombo, on the Kampala-Masindi Highway.

== Population ==
The exact population of Ndejje is not known at this time. However, Barnabus Iga Matovu, a journalist from the area, in 2012 gave the estimate population of Ndejje as over 10,000 (in a news article in a local newspaper). Matovu says the population has rapidly increased from that of about 1,000 people after the NRM Liberation war (1981–86) due to the rise of schools in the area specifically the university. The trading center also has attracted many people from villages around and land has become expensive.

== Points of Interest ==
The points of interest on Ndejje Hill or near its borders include the following:

- Ndejje Trading Center - A collection of shops and residential houses
- The Main Campus of Ndejje University - The university occupies two pieces of property on the hill, totaling 200 acres (81 ha).
- The Lady Irene Campus of Ndejje University - The university has two campuses on Ndejje Hill and a third campus on Namirembe Hill in southwest Kampala, Uganda's capital city.
- Ndejje Senior Secondary School - A public, mixed, boarding school founded in 1960, affiliated with the Church of Uganda.
- Nalinnya Lwantale Girls Senior Secondary School
- Ndejje Day Vocational Senior Secondary School
- Ndejje High School
- Hope Primary School

== See also ==
- Bombo
- Luweero
- Semuto
- Luweero District
- Central Region, Uganda
