= Weasua Air Transport =

IATA	ICAO	Call sign
—	WTC	WATCO
- Founded: 1993
- Ceased operations: 2006
- Hubs: Freetown
- Focus cities: Monrovia
- Destinations: 3
- Headquarters: Broad Street, Monrovia.
- Key people: Manual Curenca

Weasua Air Transport was a Liberian airline operating from 1993-2006.

== History ==
Weasua Air Transport was founded in 1993 during the Liberian civil war. The airline operated 3 Yak-40s until an attack on Spriggs Payne Airport in April 1996. One of the aircraft had its tail blown off and the other was damaged in a fire. The last aircraft operated charters between Freetown and Monrovia. The airline also operated An-24s, De Havilland DHC-5 Buffalos and smaller American and Soviet types. Some reports about the airline claimed that it operated illegally as a General Sales Agent for Air France, KLM and Kenya Airways in complete contravention of the 'Liberianization Policy' as well as Part 14 of the Liberia Civil Aviation Authority Regulations. One of Wesua's Yak-40s can be found abandoned at Roberts Field.

== Destinations ==
Country	City	Airport	Notes	Refs
Liberia	Monrovia	Spriggs Payne Airport	–	
Sierra Leone	Freetown	Lungi International Airport	Hub	

== Fleet ==
This was the fleet for its entire existence.

- 3 Yakovlev Yak-40
- 3 Antonov An-24
- 1 PZL-Mielec An-28
- 1 Britten-Norman BN-2 Islander

== Accidents and incidents ==
- A Yakovlev Yak-40 landed 5 m short of the runway at Sprigg Payne Airport after encountering windshear on the final approach. The aircraft hit the runway edge, causing the left landing gear to collapse. The aircraft skidded for another 300 m.
- A BN-2 Islander crashed on the beach following engine failure. it had nine passengers and one crew member. Only two people died.

== See also ==
- List of defunct airlines of Liberia
