= Sam Ntulume =

Ugandan businessman and corporate executive

- Born: c. 1971 (age 54–55); Uganda
- Education: Makerere University Business School; Eastern and Southern African Management Institute; Association of Chartered Certified Accountants; Institute of Certified Public Accountants of Uganda
- Occupations: Accountant, businessman and corporate executive
- Years active: 1991–present
- Title: Executive director and chief operations officer at I&M Bank Uganda

Sam Ntulume (born c. 1972), is a Ugandan accountant, businessman and executive director and chief operating officer at I&M Bank Uganda. He has been at I&M Bank Uganda, since November 2021.

== Background and education ==
Ntulume was born in Uganda c. 1972. After attending local primary and secondary schools, he was admitted to National College of Business Studies (today Makerere University Business School). He graduated with a Diploma in Business Studies.

He holds a Master of Business Administration degree, awarded by the Eastern and Southern African Management Institute, in Arusha, Tanzania. He is also a fellow of the Association of Chartered Certified Accountants of the United Kingdom, and a member of the Institute of Certified Public Accountants of Uganda.

== Career ==
At the time he joined I&M Bank Uganda, Ntulume's career stretched back nearly three decades, half of which has been in the financial services sector in Uganda and the region. His most recent position was as the executive director, Finance & Strategy at NCBA Bank Uganda Limited, another commercial bank.

Previously, he was an executive director, then managing director at NC Bank Uganda Limited, before its merger with Commercial Bank of Africa Uganda Limited, in 2020, to form NCBA Bank Uganda.

Ntulume has also been senior management positions at Stanbic Bank in both Uganda and Kenya. He was also previously employed by Total M&S Uganda and by the Uganda Revenue Authority.

== Other considerations ==
Since 2010, Ntulume sits on the board of trustees of Sanyu Babies Home, an orphanage in Kampala, Uganda's capital city. He is the board treasurer.
