= Fib =

Fib or FIB may refer to:

== Places ==
- Kingdom of Fib, now Fife, Scotland

== Arts, entertainment, and media ==
- Fib (poetry), a form of poetry
- Festival Internacional de Benicàssim, a Spanish music festival
- Folket i Bild, a Swedish news magazine

== Enterprises ==
- First International Bank (Liberia)
- First Investment Bank, a Bulgarian bank

== Medicine ==
- Fascia iliaca block
- Fibrillarin
- Fibrillation
- Fibrinogen
- Fibula

== Science and technology ==
- FiB index, or Fisheries in Balance index
- Flying inflatable boat
- Focused ion beam
- Forwarding information base
- Fluoride-ion Battery

== Sport ==
- Federation of International Bandy
- Fédération Internationale de Boules, the highest international authority of bocce sport

== Other uses ==
- Fib (lie), a form of bending the truth that is usually forgiven because it is not intended to deceive
- Barcelona School of Informatics (Catalan: Facultat d'Informàtica de Barcelona)
- Fires brigade, of the United States Army
- International Federation for Structural Concrete (French: Fédération Internationale du Béton)
- United Nations Force Intervention Brigade
- Federal Investigation Bureau, parody of the Federal Bureau of Investigation in the Grand Theft Auto video game series
