= List of banks in Liberia =

This is a list of commercial banks in Liberia, as updated in late 2024 by the Central Bank of Liberia.

== List of commercial banks ==
- Liberian Bank for Development and Investment (LBDI)
- Ecobank Liberia (Limited) (EBLL), part of Ecobank Group
- International Bank Liberia (Limited) (IBLL)
- Global Bank (Liberia) Limited (GBLL), part of Keystone Bank Group
- Sapelle International Bank Liberia Limited (SIBLL), part of Standard Chartered Group
- United Bank for Africa Liberia Limited (UBALL), part of UBA Group
- AccessBank Liberia - The Microfinance Bank
- Guaranty Trust Bank Liberia (GTBL), part of GTCO Group
- Afriland First Bank Liberia Limited (AFBLL), part of Afriland First Bank Group

== See also ==
- Economy of Liberia
- List of banks in Africa
