= MV Athelqueen (1942) =

History
- Name: Empire Benefit (1942-45); Athelqueen (1945-55); Mariverda (1955-61)
- Owner: Ministry of War Transport (1942-45); Athel Line Ltd (1945-55); Mariblanca Navigazione SA, Panama (1955-61)
- Operator: Ministry of War Transport (1942-45); Athel Line Ltd (1945-55); Chandris (England) Ltd (1955-61)
- Port of registry: (United Kingdom) Belfast (1942-45); (United Kingdom) London (1945-55); (Liberia) Monrovia (1955-61)
- Builder: Harland & Wolff, Belfast
- Yard number: 1164
- Launched: 24 November 1942
- Completed: 20 April 1943
- Out of service: 6 September 1961
- Identification: UK Official Number 168523; Code Letters BFJP (1943-45)
- Fate: Scrapped

General characteristics
- Tonnage: 8,202 GRT, 4,761 NRT; 11,900 DWT
- Length: 465 ft 6 in (141.88 m)
- Beam: 59 ft 5 in (18.11 m)
- Depth: 33 ft 8 in (10.26 m)
- Propulsion: One 4-stroke SCSA diesel engine 490 hp (370 kW)

Athelqueen was an 8,202 GRT tanker which was built by Harland & Wolff Ltd, Belfast in 1942 as Empire Benefit for the Ministry of War Transport. Postwar she was sold into merchant service and renamed Athelqueen and later Mariverda, serving until scrapped in 1961.

== Description ==
Empire Benefit was built by Harland & Wolff Ltd, Belfast. She was yard number 1164 and was launched on 24 November 1942 with completion on 20 April 1943. She was 465 feet 6 inches (141.88 m) long, with a beam of 59 feet 5 inches (18.11 m) and a depth of 33 feet 8 inches (10.26 m). Her GRT was 8,202, with a NRT of 4,761, and a DWT of 11,900.

== Career ==
Empire Benefit was placed under the management of Dodd, Thompson & Co Ltd. She was a member of a number of convoys during the Second World War.

MKS 16A

Convoy MKS 16A departed Tripoli, Libya on 29 June 1943 and arrived at Gibraltar on 6 July.

HX 253

Convoy HX 253 departed New York on 20 August 1943 and arrived at Liverpool on 4 September. Empire Benefit was due to sail with this convoy but joined the following one, HX 254.

HX 254

Convoy HX 254 departed New York on 27 August 1943 and arrived at Liverpool on 12 September. Empire Benefit was bound for Milford Haven and Falmouth.

In 1945, Empire Benefit was sold to Athel Line Ltd and renamed Athelqueen. Her port of registry was changed to London. In 1955, Athelqueen was sold to Mariblanca Navigazione SA, Panama, as she was unsuitable for transporting molasses and due for an extensive refit. Athelqueen was renamed Mariverda. She was operated under the management of Chandris (England) Ltd, and reflagged to Liberia. On 11 February 1958, Mariverda ran aground in the Suez Canal during foggy weather. She served until 1961 when she was scrapped at Kure, Japan, arriving on 6 September.

== Official Numbers and Code Letters ==
Official Numbers were a forerunner to IMO Numbers. Empire Benefit had the UK Official Number 168528 and the Code Letters BFJP.

== Propulsion ==
The ship was propelled by a four-stroke Single Cycle Single Action diesel engine which had six cylinders, 29 1/8 inches (740 mm) diameter by 59 1/16 inches (1,500 mm) stroke. It was built by Harland & Wolff Ltd, Glasgow.
