= Asinansi Nyakato =

Ugandan politician

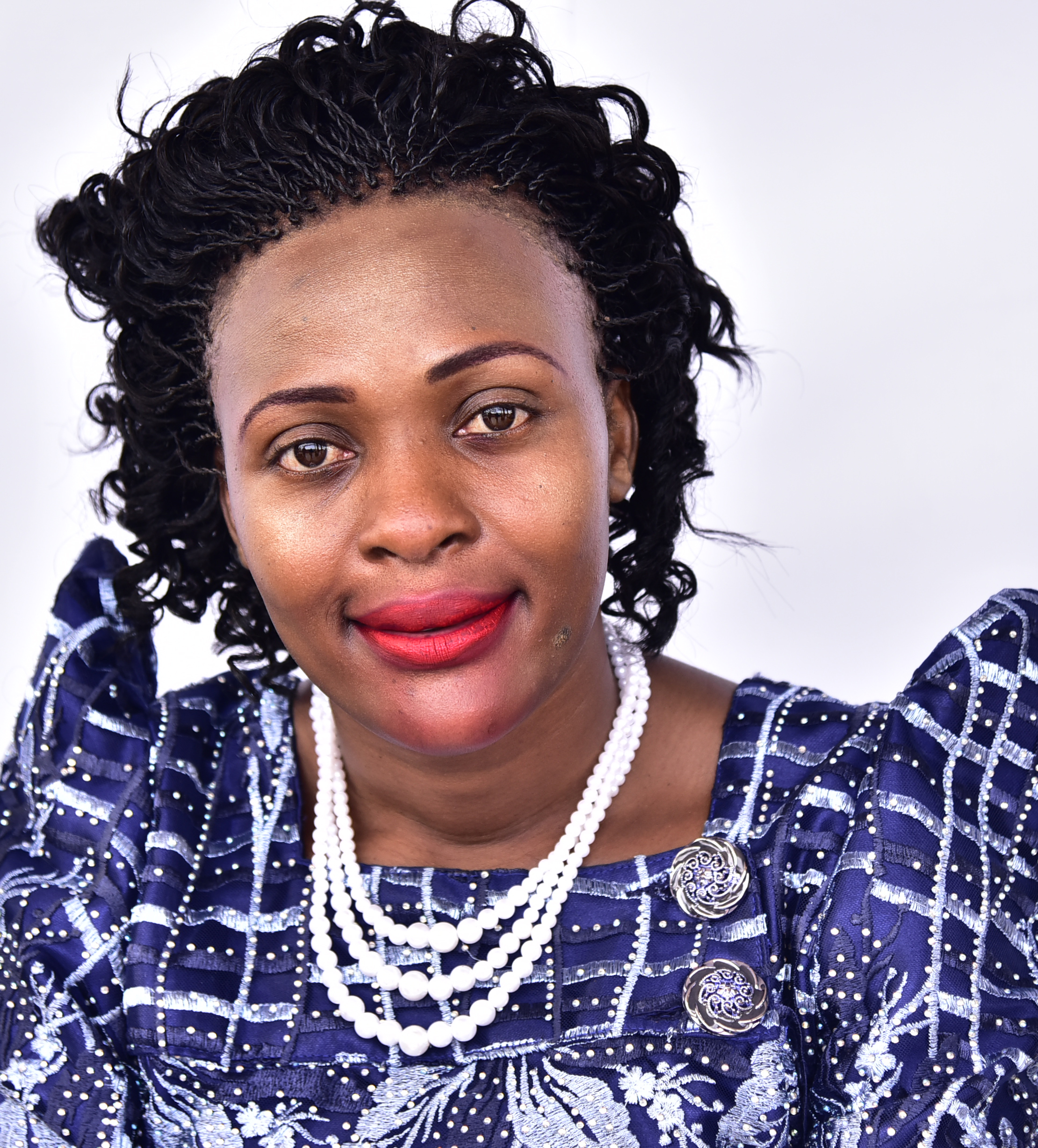
- Born: Hoima District
- Education: Ndejje University
- Occupations: politician, legislator
- Title: princess
- Political party: People's Front for Freedom

Asinansi Nyakato, also known as Kamanda, is a Ugandan politician and member of Parliament for Hoima city, in the 12th parliament for 2026 to 2031. She is affiliated to the People's Front for Freedom party (PFF).

== Early life and education ==
Nyakato is a princess of Bunyoro Kitara Kingdom. She holds a Bachelor's degree in Social Work from Ndejje University.

== Career ==
Nyakato is a joint opposition candidate. In 2011, she contested for the Hoima female parliamentary seat and emerged as runner up after losing to Ms Tophas Kaahwa Byagira. In August 2011, she joined the Parliament of Uganda where she worked as a policy analyst up to 2016. She is an FDC National Executive Member where she serves as secretary for health services. She is also the FDC Hoima Municipality general secretary. She previously served as secretary for environment in the FDC youth league. She later returned to advocate for the communities affected by the oil and gas developments in the Albertine graben.
