= Global Bank Liberia =

Liberian commercial bank

- Company type: Private
- Industry: Financial services
- Founded: 2005
- Headquarters: Monrovia, Liberia
- Key people: Rotimi Sangodeyi; Managing Director
- Products: Loans, Checking, Savings, Investments, Debit Cards
- Number of employees: 68 (2010)

Global Bank Liberia Limited (GBLL), commonly referred to as Global Bank Liberia, is a commercial bank in Liberia. It is one of the commercial banks licensed by the Central Bank of Liberia, the national banking regulator.

== Overview ==
Global Bank Liberia is a private commercial bank. It was granted a banking license by the Central Bank of Liberia on February 10, 2005. The majority shareholders of the bank were Europeans who have investment interest in Africa and have substantial investment in Liberia. In January 2009, the ownership of Global Bank Liberia Limited (GBLL) was transferred to Platinum Habib Bank (Bank PHB). The takeover increased the bank's capital by US$8.5 million to US$10 million. The new corporate entity was known as Global Bank PHB, between 2005 and 2011. Among the banking products on offer, is Internet Banking and money transfer services under the MoneyGram brand. When Bank PHB in Nigeria collapsed in August 2011, its interest in Global Bank Liberia was assumed by Keystone Bank Limited.

== Ownership ==
Global Bank Liberia Limited, is a 100% subsidiary of Keystone Bank Limited, a large financial services provider based in Nigeria, with subsidiaries in Gambia, Liberia, Sierra Leone and Uganda.

== Branch Network ==
As of September 2013, Global Bank Liberia maintains six branches, including at these locations:

1. Main Branch - 5th Street, Sinkor, Monrovia
2. Ashmun Branch - Ashmun Street, Monrovia
3. Redlight Branch - Redlight Market, Paynesville
4. Clara Town Branch - Clara Town, Monrovia
5. Buchanan Branch - Tubman Street Buchanan
6. Branch Number 6

== See also ==
- Bank PHB
- Economy of Liberia
- List of banks in Liberia
