= Susan Lakot =

Ugandan military officer

Major Susan Lakot
- Born: 7 July 1975 (age 51); Kitgum District, Uganda
- Citizenship: Uganda
- Education: Bukoyo Senior Secondary School (High School Diploma); Kyambogo University (Diploma in Secondary Education); Ndejje University (Bachelor of Education)
- Years active: 2003–present
- Known for: Teaching ability, Military matters
- Title: Member of Parliament Representing Uganda People's Defence Forces in the 10th Parliament (2016–2021)
- Spouse: Robert Abok (m. 2018)

Colonel Susan Oruni Lakot, is a Ugandan educator and military officer, who served as an elected member of parliament representing the Uganda People's Defence Forces (UPDF) in the 10th Parliament (2016–2021).

== Background and education ==
She was born on 7 July 1975, in Kitgum District, in the Northern Region of Uganda. She attended Kitgum Public Primary School, for her elementary schooling. She then went to "YY Okot Memorial College" in Kitgum, where she completed her O-Level studies. She obtained her High School certificate, after completing her A-Level education at Bukoyo Secondary School, in Iganga Town, in 1993.

She was admitted to the National Teachers College (now part of Kyambogo University), graduating in 1999, with a Diploma in Secondary Education. Ten years later, she graduated from Ndejje University with a Bachelor of Education degree.

== Career ==
According to her biography at the website of the Ugandan parliament, Susan Lakot began teaching at Bombo Army Secondary School, in 2003, as a civilian teacher. Three years later, she was promoted to the position of Deputy Head Teacher at the same school, still as a civilian.

She joined the UPDF in 2010. That same year, she was posted to the Uganda Junior Staff College, in Jinja, Jinja District, in the Eastern Region of Uganda. In 2011, she was elected to the 9th parliament (2011–2016). In 2016, she was re-elected to the 10th parliament (2016–2021).

== Family ==
Major Susan Lakot is married to Sergeant Robert Abok, an officer in the Uganda Police Force.

== See also ==
- Military of Uganda
- Flavia Byekwaso
- List of members of the tenth Parliament of Uganda
- Parliament of Uganda
- Uganda People's Defence Force
