= Olivia Nassaka Banja =

- Born: 1967 (age 58–59); Uganda
- Citizenship: Ugandan
- Occupations: Academic, education administrator
- Known for: First female Vice Chancellor of Ndejje University
- Office: Vice Chancellor of Ndejje University
- Predecessor: Eriabu Lugujjo

Academic background
- Education: University of Edinburgh

Academic work
- Discipline: Theology

Olivia Nassaka Banja (born 1967) is a Ugandan academic and education administrator. She previously served as Dean of the School of Divinity and Theology at Uganda Christian University and became Vice Chancellor of Ndejje University in 2023, becoming the university's first female vice chancellor.

== Early life and education ==
Banja was born to James Lwanga Salongo and Daisy Ndagire Nalongo. She was raised in a Christian family and received her primary education at Bat Valley Primary School before attending Nakasero Secondary School in Kampala for both her O and A-level education.

She initially intended to study law but later chose to pursue education and theology. She earned a Diploma in Education, a Bachelor of Divinity, and a Master's degree in Religious Studies, Mission and Ministry, and Theology by Research. In 2004, she completed her PhD in Theology at the University of Edinburgh.

== Career ==
Banja started her professional career as a teacher before moving into theological and academic work. In 1993, she served as curate of St Andrew's Cathedral in Mityana Diocese and became the cathedral's acting vicar the following year. She later joined Uganda Christian University (UCU) as one of its inaugural staff members, where she worked as a lecturer and female students' warden. In 2004, she was promoted to senior lecturer and took part in the development of UCU's Doctor of Ministry programme.

In 2008, she became the first female Dean of UCU's Bishop Tucker School of Divinity and Theology, serving in the position until June 2014. During her tenure, she contributed to the introduction of a revised curriculum, developed collaborative research with organizations such as World Vision and Yale University, and introduced a doctoral programme in theology. She later served as UCU's Director for Teaching and Learning before being appointed Dean of the School of Education in September 2021.

In 2023, Banja was appointed Vice Chancellor of Ndejje University, making her the first woman to hold the position. She officially took office on 1 January 2023, succeeding Professor Eriabu Lugujjo. In her role as Vice Chancellor, she has overseen the university's academic development, research, innovation, and partnerships with government, industry, and communities.

== Other responsibilities ==
Banja has been a Board Member of the Inter-Religious Council of Uganda (IRCU). She has also served as Chairperson of the Board of Governors of the Bible Society of Uganda, where she took part in overseeing the organization's strategic plans and programmes.

== See also ==
- Mary Okwakol
- Sarah Nyendwoha Ntiro
