= Satgur Air Transport =

Airline company

IATA	ICAO	Call sign
2S	TGR	SatgurAir
- Commenced operations: 2004
- Ceased operations: 2006
- Operating bases: Roberts International Airport
- Fleet size: Antonov AN-24
- Destinations: Dakar Abidjan Conakry
- Headquarters: Monrovia, Liberia

Satgur Air Transport was an airline based at Roberts International Airport, near Monrovia, Liberia. The airline, also called Satqar Air, began operations in 2004.

== Operations ==
Satgur operated Antonov AN-24s to Dakar, Abidjan, and Conakry. The airline was criticized for failing to meet basic safety requirements in 2004, but it implied that its aircraft was airworthy by responding that it "will never put the lives of passengers at risk".

In 2006 its operating certificate was revoked and it was added to the European Union list of banned air carriers.

== Code data ==
- IATA Code: 2S
- ICAO Code: TGR
- Callsign: SATGURAIR

== See also ==
- List of defunct airlines of Liberia
