= First International Bank (Liberia) =

- Type: Private
- Industry: Financial services
- Headquarters: Monrovia, Liberia
- Key people: Oluwole Sodipe; Managing Director
- Products: Loans, Checking, Savings, Investments, Debit Cards

First International Bank (Liberia) Limited (FIB) is a commercial bank in Liberia.

(FIB) also have sub branch in Nimba County Liberia.

== Overview ==
First International Bank is a leading financial services provider in Liberia. With headquarters in Monrovia, the bank has branches in the capital suburbs and in the provinces.

Our loans cover funding for fixed assets, equipment purchase, and working capital, in addition to financing acquisitions & business expansion.

== Branch Network ==
The known locations of branches of the First International Bank (Liberia) include the following locations:

1. Main Branch - Broad Street, Monrovia
2. Paynesville Branch - Redlight, Paynesville
3. Clara Town Branch - Clara Town
4. Duala Branch (MIC Building.
5. Sinkor Branch (15th Street)
6. Buchanan Branch (Robert Street)
7. Ganta Branch (Guinea Road Junction)
8. Greenville Branch (Adjacent Post Office)
9. Money Gram Outlet (Logan Town Junction)
10. Money Gram Outlet (Wroto Town)
11. Money Gram Outlet (Duport Road)
12. Money Gram Outlet (Bardnersville Junction)

== See also ==
- Economy of Liberia
- List of banks in Liberia
