= Liberian companies =

Companies in the Republic of Liberia are regulated by a variety of laws. The corporate laws of Liberia were promulgated over 50 years ago to provide an offshore jurisdiction for ship owners and the international financial community. The LISCR (Liberian International Ship & Corporate Registry) has been appointed by the government of Liberia as its agent to manage corporate registry and to act as the sole entity for foreign companies registered in Liberia. The LISCR is headquartered in Dulles, Virginia, US and has an office located in Zurich, Switzerland.

There are two income tax treaties with Sweden and Germany in force.

Additionally, Liberia as a corporate jurisdiction is on OECD’s white-list of countries that have substantially implemented tax transparency and meet the internationally agreed tax standard.

== Shipping companies ==
The Liberian Registry – the largest in the world by gross tonnage – includes over 5,000 ships of more than 244 million gross tons, which accounts for 16 percent of the world's oceangoing fleet. The Liberian fleet is one of the youngest of all nations, with an average vessel age of 12 years. According to the U.S. Maritime Administration, Liberian-flagged vessels carry more than one-third of the oil imported into the United States.

The Liberian Registry is administered by the Liberian International Ship & Corporate Registry (LISCR, LLC), a U.S. owned and operated company that provides the day-to-day management for the Republic of Liberia's (ROL) ship and corporate registry.

In addition to its regional offices in many major maritime centers of the world, the Liberian Registry is also supported by a worldwide network with over 500 Nautical Inspectors and Auditors.

The Liberian Registry is open to any ship owner in the world. In order to enter the Liberian registry, a vessel must be less than 20 years of age and must meet high safety standards.

Liberian flagged ships are able to trade anywhere in the world. There are no crew nationality restrictions and taxes on Liberian vessels are at conservative rates based on the net tonnage. Registration of vessels is eligible to Liberian entities or registered business entities incorporated under other jurisdictions and registered as a Liberian Foreign Maritime Entity.

== Documentation ==
Liberian corporations, LLCs, partnerships, and not-for-profit businesses are easily formed. No special documents are required to be submitted other than an order form confirming the details of the entity requested. They however will only accept formation instructions from a professional user of offshore corporations including ship managers, manning agents, ship owners, etc., as well as trust and company managers, lawyers, accountants, investment companies, etc. They do not accept instructions directly from individuals not engaged professionally in company management or acting as a professional advisor or lawyer.

== Subscription rights ==
The Articles of Incorporation should include at the minimum, the name of the corporation; the purpose of the corporation; the type of shares and total authorized share capital; the name of the incorporator and names of any subscribers of shares and the number of initial directors.

Directors, shareholders and other officers do not need to be registered in Liberia and thus it is not possible to obtain from the public record any form of evidence of directors, shareholders or officers. This particular feature makes the administration of a Liberian Company particularly simple for offshore trust Companies. Unfortunately it can sometimes create difficulties if a Liberian company is to enter into a contract, since the Counter-Party must follow the paper trail to ensure they are dealing with duly elected officials of the company. For this purpose, Liberian corporations can voluntarily file such information as needed to conduct their business.

== Accounts ==
Liberian companies shall keep correct and complete books and records or account and shall keep minutes of all meetings of shareholders, of actions taken on consent by shareholders, of all meetings of the board of directors, of actions taken on consent by directors and of meetings of the executive committee, if any. There is no requirement to file this information in the Public Register; instead, the corporation is responsible for the safekeeping of its records. There is no requirement to have audited accounts for a Liberian Corporation. Any decision to audit the accounts is one for the shareholders to take.

== Bank secrecy laws ==
Liberia has no special bank secrecy laws like other tax havens, but this is not a deterrent as few Liberian offshore corporations actually handle their banking transactions within Liberia's territory borders. Moreover, there is no requirement that they must bank in Liberia.

Certified copies of filed corporate records are available for order by the public.

== See also ==
- List of Liberian companies
