= Enterprise Bank Limited =

Nigerian commercial bank

- Company type: Private
- Industry: Financial services
- Predecessor: Spring Bank
- Founded: 2011
- Headquarters: 143 Ahmadu Bello Way; Victoria Island, Lagos, Nigeria
- Key people: Sir. Ogala Osoka MFR; Chairman; Mary Akpobome; Ag. Managing Director & CEO
- Products: Loans, Checking, Savings, Investments, Debit Cards, Credit Cards
- Revenue: ▲Pretax:US$70.64 million (NGN:11.3 billion) (2012)
- Total assets: US$1.63+ billion (NGN:261.1 billion) (2012)
- Website: Homepage

Enterprise Bank Limited (EBL), also known as Enterprise Bank, was a commercial bank in Nigeria. It was licensed as a commercial bank by the Central Bank of Nigeria, the country's banking regulator.

== Overview ==
Enterprise Bank was a large financial services provider in Nigeria. As of December 2012, the bank's total assets were estimated at US$1.63 billion (NGN:261.1 billion). According to the bank's website, shareholders' equity was valued at approximately US$186.5 million (NGN:29.8 billion) in August 2011.

== History ==
Enterprise Bank was established in August 2011 through the acquisition of assets and certain liabilities from the now defunct Spring Bank, which had its commercial banking license revoked. EBL obtained a commercial banking license on 5 August 2011.

== Ownership ==
As of September 2013, all the assets of Enterprise Bank Limited were 100% owned by Asset Management Company of Nigeria (AMCON), a subsidiary of the Federal Government of Nigeria. In 2015, Heritage Banking Company Limited acquired Enterprise Bank after making an investment of ₦56 billion.

== Governance ==
The chairman of the board of directors of Enterprise Bank Limited is Sir Ogala Osoka MFR. The managing director and chief executive officer of the bank is Ahmed Kuru.

== See also ==
- List of banks in Nigeria
- Central Bank of Nigeria
- Economy of Nigeria
- Spring Bank
