= Dolphin Air =

IATA	ICAO	Call sign
ZD	FDN	FLYING DOLPHIN
- Founded: 1996
- Ceased operations: 2008
- Hubs: Dubai International Airport
- Fleet size: 2
- Headquarters: Dubai, United Arab Emirates
- Key people: Abdulla Zayed Saqr Al Nahyan (Founder)

Dolphin Air was a charter airline based in Dubai, United Arab Emirates. It operated charter services within the Middle East and Pakistan. Its main base was Dubai International Airport.

== History ==
The airline started operations in 2002. It was a charter airline based in Dubai that was founded in 1996 as Santa Cruz Imperial Airlines in Liberia, acquired later by Flying Dolphin Airlines and relocated. It was reorganised by Arabian Devt Trading and Construction, taking over assets from Santa Cruz Imperial. It had 68 employees (at March 2007).

== Fleet ==
The Dolphin Air fleet consisted of the following aircraft:

- 2 Boeing 737-200
