= Finnish International Baccalaureate Society =

Finnish academic society

The Finnish International Baccalaureate Society ry. (FIBS) is a registered Finnish organisation for both IB students and IB graduates. FIBS members are students who are currently undergoing the International Baccalaureate Diploma Programme in Finland. The organisation's purpose is to advance the recognition of the IB Diploma Programme in Finnish institutes of higher education and assist and ease the placement of students into universities. FIBS further aims to uphold the student rights of every IB student, current and past and to keep in contact with all IB institutions in Finland and to achieve beneficial corporation. It is also a member of the Union of Upper Secondary School Students in Finland (SLL).

== Governing board ==
FIBS has a board that consists of a Chairperson, Vice-Chairperson and three-thirteen (3-13) board members. The Chairperson, Vice-Chairperson and the board are elected at the Annual General Assembly (GA) during the fall of each year. The GA gives every IB student who is also a registered member of FIBS and has an active Student Card from SLL the right to vote and apply to be a part of the following years board.

The current board: 2024

- Chairperson: Skyla Pihlajasaari
- Vice-Chairperson: Maija Kosunen
- Secretary: Julia Elfving
- Treasurer: Henry Hyytinen
- Events and Well-being Managers: Kavika Vasanthakumar & Jodeka Linkheswaran
- Students Rights Representatives: Htoo Ei Chal & Kavika Vasanthakumar
- Student Council and Membership Managers: Jodeka Linkheswaran & Heli Huttunen
- Business Cooperation Managers: Julia Elfving & Henry Hyytinen
- PR and Marketing Managers: Heli Huttunen & Htoo Ei Chal

== Achievements ==
So far, FIBS has managed to convince the University of Helsinki to not require the normally mandatory Swedish examination from IB students. Also, the Helsinki University of Technology allows IB students to apply with their final grades and without entrance examinations if certain criteria are fulfilled; the student had to study Math and Chemistry or Physics at Higher Level and score a minimum of 34 points. Some programs also have maximum quotas for this kind of application. Also, upon requests by FIBS and others, the International Baccalaureate Organization has decided to print umlauts and other non-ASCII characters on IB graduates' diplomas.
