= International Bank (Liberia) =

International Bank (Liberia), Limited (IBLL) is a full-service bank based in Liberia. The bank was created when the International Trust Company of Liberia created a commercial banking department in 1960. In 2000 the International Trust Company became the International Bank. It is headquartered in Monrovia with several locations throughout the country. International Bank extends a variety of banking services, including but not limited to: commercial and personal banking, commercial and personal loans, money transfer services, including wires, MoneyGram, Western Union, RIA, & Nobel, and payroll & tuition services.

Locations include Harbel, Harper, Pleebo, Kakata, Caldwell, Paynesville, Sinkor, Camp Johnson Road, Vai Town, Broad Street, and the Monrovia Post offices.

== See also ==
- Economy of Liberia
- List of banks in Liberia
