= Liberia Airways =

Liberian airline

IATA	ICAO	Call sign
n/a	LBA	LIBERIA AIRWAYS
- Ceased operations: 1998
- Headquarters: Liberia

Liberia Airways was an airline based in Liberia.

The company provided transportation assistance to United Nations High Commissioner for Refugees during civil wars in Liberia and Sierra Leone, passenger and cargo services between and within Liberia, Sierra Leone, Guinea, Guinea Bissau, Gambia, Senegal, Mauritania, Mali, Ivory Coast, Ghana, Nigeria, Niger, Burkina Faso, Benin, Cameroon, Equatorial Guinea, Gabon, Democratic Republic of the Congo, Republic of the Congo.

At its peak in 1996–1997, Liberia Airways had several hundred employees, international routes to over a dozen of West African countries, and operated a small fleet of USSR-built aircraft Antonov An-26, Antonov An-24, Mi-8.

Charles Taylor (former leader of the National Patriotic Front of Liberia (NPFL), former president of the Republic of Liberia, and convicted war criminal) played a critical personal role in the demise of the company. Due to his open animosity towards Liberia Airways given its neutral stance during the civil war, the company was forced to relocate its operational base first to Conakry, Guinea, and then Banjul, Gambia.

Liberia Airways ceased active operations by the end of 1998.

== Fleet ==
As of August 2006, the Liberia Airways fleet includes:

- 1 Antonov An-26

== See also ==
- List of defunct airlines of Liberia
