= I&M Bank Uganda =

Ugandan commercial bank

Coordinates: 0.317583°N 32.590667°E

- Company type: Subsidiary of I&M Holdings Limited
- Industry: Financial services
- Founded: 1993; 33 years ago
- Headquarters: Kampala, Uganda
- Key people: Francis Kamulegeya. Chairman; Robin Bairstow; Managing Director & CEO; Sam Ntulume; Executive Director
- Products: Banking
- Revenue: ▲Aftertax:USh 20.3 billion (2024)
- Total assets: USh 1.1 trillion (2024)
- Number of employees: 320 (2024)
- Parent: I&M Bank Group
- Website: Homepage

I&M Bank (Uganda) Limited, formerly Orient Bank is licensed by the Bank of Uganda (BOU), the central bank and national banking regulator. It was officially launched in to the Ugandan market following the completion of the acquisition of 90 percent shareholding of Orient Bank Limited. On 8 November 2021, Orient Bank was rebranded to I&M Bank (Uganda) Limited.

== Location ==
The bank's headquarters and main branch are located at Kingdom Kampala, Plot 31A-35A and 37A-39A, Nile Avenue, in the central business district of Kampala, Uganda's capital and largest city. The geographical coordinates of the bank's headquarters are: 0°19'03.3"N, 32°35'26.4"E (Latitude:0.317583; Longitude:32.590667).

== Overview ==
As of December 2024, the bank’s total assets had grown by 16 percent to UGX 1.1 trillion, up from UGX 944 billion. Shareholders' equity also increased by 10 percent, rising to UGX 219 billion from UGX 199 billion.

== History ==
The bank was founded in 1993 by a group of business people who were related by blood and marriage.

In 1996, the bank opened its second branch in the city of Jinja, about one hour's drive east of the capital Kampala. In 2002, the bank acquired Trans-Africa Bank Limited, which had been declared insolvent by the BOU.

Following a spate of Ugandan bank failures in the 1990s and early 2000s, the banking laws in Uganda were changed to bar family members from jointly owning more than 49 per cent in the same financial institution. Orient Bank was given a grace period to find a suitable investor.

In April 2009, Bank PHB Group, a Nigerian financial services group, acquired 80 per cent shareholding in Orient Bank for a cash payment of US$62 million. In August 2011, the group was itself declared insolvent by the Central Bank of Nigeria, and its assets and some liabilities were acquired by Keystone Bank Limited, which was owned by the Federal Government of Nigeria.

In July 2014, international media reported that Keystone Bank planned to divest from Orient Bank. In February 2015, Keystone Bank divested from Orient Bank by selling 42 per cent shareholding to the private equity firm 8 Miles Fund, whose shareholders include the celebrity and activist Bob Geldof. The remaining 38 per cent was sold to three individuals, namely Ketan Morjaria; one of the founders of the bank, Alemayehu Fisseha, and Zhong Shuang Quan.

== Ownership ==
As of February 2015, the shareholding of the bank was as depicted in the table below:

Orient Bank stock ownership in 2015
Rank	Name of owner	Percentage ownership
1	Ketan Morjaria	49.0
2	8 Miles Fund	42.0
3	Alemayehu Fisseha	4.5
4	Zhong Shuang Quan	4.5
	Total	100.0

== Acquisition ==
In July 2020, I&M Holdings Limited signed an agreement with the shareholders of Orient Bank Limited, to buy 90 per cent equity in the issued share capital of Orient Bank Limited. The transaction was valued in excess of KSh 2 billion (US$20 million), and was subject to regulatory approval from Uganda and Kenya.

In November 2020, the Business Daily Africa newspaper reported that I&M Holdings Limited of Kenya would pay US$33.6 million in exchange for 90 per cent shareholding in Orient Bank. After the acquisition has been concluded, the shareholding in the institution looks as illustrated in the table below.

I&M Bank Uganda stock ownership
Rank	Name of owner	Percentage ownership
1	Alemayehu Fisseha	4.5
2	Ketan Morjaria	5.5
3	I&M Bank Group	90.0
	Total	100.0

The acquisition of 90 per cent shareholding in this bank by I&M Holdings Limited was concluded on 30 April 2021 when necessary approvals were obtained from the "Central Bank of Kenya, the Bank of Uganda, the Capital Markets Authority of Kenya and the Common Market for Eastern and Southern Africa (COMESA)".

At the time it was acquired, I&M Bank Uganda, according to The East African newspaper, had a customer base of about 70,000, deposits worth KSh 18.2 billion (US$170.09 million), and a net loan book of approximately KSh 7.7 billion (US$71.96 million). At that time, the bank employed 340 members of staff, in 14 networked branches, and maintained 22 automated teller machines.

On 8 November 2021, Orient Bank rebranded to I&M Bank Uganda, following authorization by the Bank of Uganda.

In January 2022, the Business Daily Africa reported that the final price paid for the 90 per cent shares in Orient Bank had risen from KSh 3.6 billion to KSh 4.1 billion, after valuation of the quality of assets of the acquired subsidiary. (KSh 4.1 billion was about US$36.26 million on 31 January 2022). The final payment was expected to conclude in July 2022.

== Governance ==
The bank is governed by an eight-person board of directors, two of whom are executive directors and the other six are non-executive. Suleiman I. Kiggundu, Jr., one of the non-executive directors, is the chairman. Robin Bairstow is the managing director and chief executive officer. Sam Ntulume serves as the executive director.

== Branch network ==
As of May 2021, the bank had a network of branches in the central, eastern, and northern regions of Uganda. The branches of the bank included the following locations:

- Main Branch - I&M Plaza, 6/6A Kampala Road, Kampala
- Acacia Branch: Acacia Shopping Mall, Kisementi, Kololo, Kampala
- Arua Branch: 1Acacia Mall, Kisementi, Kampala
- Bweyogerere Branch: Mamerito House, Jinja Road, Bweyogerere
- Entebbe Town Branch: 29 Kampala Road, Entebbe
- Jinja City Branch: 8 Lady Alice Muloki Road, Jinja
- Kabalagala Branch: 1900 Ggaba Road, Kabalagala, Kampala
- Kawempe Branch: 78 Bombo Road, Kawempe, Kampala
- Kololo Branch: Nyonyi Gardens, 16/17 Wampeewo Avenue, Kololo, Kampala
- Ntinda Branch: Capital Shoppers Mall, Ntinda Road, Ntinda
- William Street Branch - William Street, Kampala

== See also ==
- Banking in Uganda
- Ugandan Commercial Banks
- Credit Bank
