= LoneStar Airways =

Liberian airline

| IATA | ICAO | Call sign |
|---|---|---|
| - | LOA | - |
- Ceased operations: 2006
- Fleet size: 1 Boeing 727
- Headquarters: Liberia

LoneStar Airways was an airline based in Liberia.

== History ==
It has been slow to start services and its Boeing 727 was parked at Belgrade since October 2004, but for some time was used by Aviogenex under Serbian registration of YU-AKD. The airline claims to be starting services in the West African region using Boeing 737-200 aircraft.

== Destinations ==
In 2006, Lonestar announced a list of destinations that they would start flying to regularly. These are Lagos, Accra, Abidjan, Monrovia, Freetown, Banjul and Dakar.

== See also ==
- List of defunct airlines of Liberia

== Fleet ==
The LoneStar Airways fleet consisted of one Boeing 727-200 aircraft at April 2005.
