= Air Liberia =

Liberian airline

IATA	ICAO	Call sign
NL	ALI	AIR LIBERIA
- Founded: 1974
- Ceased operations: 2006
- Hubs: Roberts International Airport & Spriggs Payne Airport
- Parent company: Managed by Hughes AirWest initially
- Headquarters: Monrovia, Liberia

Air Liberia was a domestic airline based in Liberia.

== History ==
The airline formed in 1974 following a merger between Liberian National Airlines, which was established as Liberian National Airways in 1948, and Ducor Air Transport (DATCO). The carrier ceased trading in 1990. It initially operated a fleet including Cessna 337 Skymaster, De Havilland Canada DHC-2 Beaver, and Douglas DC-3s, joined by Britten-Norman BN-2 Islander and Trislander aircraft in 1975 for scheduled services. In February 1978 a Hawker Siddeley HS 748 was purchased from the manufacturer in order to operate domestic flights. The aircraft was written off in April 1983. A Boeing 737 was used for government VIP operations.

== Accidents and incidents ==
- On 19 April 1975, Douglas DC-3 EL-AAB was damaged beyond economic repair in a take-off accident at Roberts International Airport, Harbel. All 25 people on board survived.
- On 16 April 1983, HS 748 EL-AIH was destroyed when, shortly after taking off from Khartoum Airport, an engine failed. Eight of the nine persons on board were killed.

== See also ==
- List of defunct airlines of Liberia
