= Spring Bank =

Nigerian commercial bank

Spring Bank Plc.
- Company type: Public: NSE: SPRINGBANK
- Industry: Financial services
- Founded: 2004
- Defunct: 2011
- Fate: Insolvency
- Successor: Enterprise Bank Limited
- Headquarters: 143 Ahmadu Bello Way; Victoria Island, Lagos, Nigeria
- Key people: Bernadina Sola Ayodele; Chairman; Suzanne Iroche, Group Managing Director & CEO
- Products: Loans, Checking, Savings, Investments, Debit Cards, Credit Cards
- Website: Homepage

Spring Bank Plc., also referred to as Spring Bank, was a commercial bank in Nigeria. It was one of the twenty-six (26) commercial banks licensed by the Central Bank of Nigeria, the country's banking regulator at the time.

== Overview ==
Spring Bank was a large financial services provider in Nigeria. As of June 2010, the bank's total assets were estimated at US$1.31 billion (NGN:201.3 billion). The stock of Spring Bank was listed on the Nigerian Stock Exchange, where it traded under the symbol: SPRINGBANK.

== History ==
Spring Bank was formed in December 2005 by the merger of six (6) Nigerian financial institutions, namely:

1. ACB International Bank Plc.
2. Citizens International Bank Plc.
3. Fountain Trust Bank Plc.
4. Guardian Express Bank Plc.
5. Omega Bank Plc.
6. Trans International Bank Plc.

At the time it was formed, Spring Bank had a capital base of approximately US$224 million (NGN:34.5 billion) with total assets estimated at US$988 million (NGN:152 billion).

== Failure and liquidation ==
In 2009, following an industry-wide audit of all commercial banks in the country, the Central Bank of Nigeria (CBN), the banking regulator in the country, found nine commercial banks under-capitalized and badly managed. Spring Bank was one of the troubled banks. The CBN intervened by injecting new capital to maintain solvency and appointing new management. On 5 August 2011 the CBN revoked the banking license of Spring Bank.

Enterprise Bank was formed in August 2011 by taking over the assets and some of the liabilities of the now defunct Spring Bank, whose commercial banking license was revoked. EBL was issued a commercial banking license on 5 August 2011. As of January 2012, the assets of Enterprise Bank Limited are 100% owned by Asset Management Company of Nigeria (AMCON), an arm of the Federal Government of Nigeria. In July 2012, the Federal High Court of Nigeria, in Lagos ordered that the affairs of the defunct Spring Bank Plc be wound up, since its license had been revoked.

== Governance ==
Following the intervention of the Central Bank of Nigeria in 2009, Bernadina Sola Ayodele was appointed Group Managing Director and Chief Executive Officer.

== See also ==
- List of banks in Nigeria
- Central Bank of Nigeria
- Economy of Nigeria
