= NCBA Bank Uganda =

Commercial bank in Uganda

NCBA Bank Uganda Limited
- Type: Subsidiary of NCBA Group Plc
- Industry: Financial services
- Founded: 2012; 14 years ago
- Headquarters: Twed Towers; Kafu Road Road; Kampala, Uganda
- Key people: Grace Jethro Kavuma; Chairman; Mark Muyobo; Chief Executive Officer
- Products: Loans, savings, checking, investments, debit cards, credit cards
- Revenue: ▲Aftertax:UGX:27 billion (US$7.187 million) (2023)
- Total assets: UGX:854 billion (US$227.34 million) (2023)
- Website: Homepage

NCBA Bank Uganda Limited (commonly called NCBA Bank Uganda or shortened to NCBAU) is a commercial bank in Uganda. It is one of the commercial banks licensed by the Bank of Uganda, the country's central bank and national banking regulator.

== Overview ==
NCBA Bank Uganda is a Corporate led Commercial Bank in Uganda, focusing on meeting the banking needs of Large Corporates and large corporations. As of 31 December 2023, the total assets of the bank were valued at UGX:854 billion (US$227.324 million). The bank is a wholly owned subsidiary of the NCBA Group Plc, headquartered in Nairobi, Kenya, with subsidiaries in Kenya, Tanzania, Rwanda, Ivory Coast and Uganda.

== History ==
The bank was founded in 2012 as NC Bank Uganda and received a commercial banking license from the Bank of Uganda in April 2012. The bank opened for business in May 2012.

In September 2019, the two parent companies of NC Bank Uganda and Commercial Bank of Africa (Uganda), both based in Kenya, received regulatory approval to merge their businesses, thereby merging their subsidiaries in Uganda to form NCBA Bank Uganda, effective 1 October 2019, subject to the approval of the Bank of Uganda.

In June 2020, Bank of Uganda gave consent for the merger of NC Bank Uganda with CBA Uganda. The merger process is expected to be complete by 31 September 2020. The combined bank had total assets of USh548 billion (approx. US$149 million), as of 31 March 2020.

== Management ==
Anthony Ndegwa, formerly managing director of CBA Uganda Limited, was appointed managing director of NCBA Bank Uganda, effective June 2020. In December 2020, Anthony Ndegwa left the bank and Mark Muyobo was appointed as managing director and CEO, in acting capacity.

== Branches ==
As of May 2024, the bank maintained networked branches at the following locations:

1. Nakasero Branch: Rwenzori House, Nakasero Road, Nakasero, Kampala Main Branch
2. Bugoloobi Branch: 2nd Floor, Village Mall, Bugolobi, Kampala
3. Forest Mall Branch: Forest Mall, Lugogo, Kampala.
4. Kafu Road Branch: Twed Towers, 10 Kafu Road, Nakasero, Kampala.
5. Namanve Branch - Namanve Industrial Business Park.

== See also ==
- Banking in Uganda
- List of banks in Uganda
- Economy of Uganda
