= Heritage Bank (Nigeria) =

Nigerian financial services institution

Heritage Bank Plc
- Company type: Public company by shares
- Industry: Financial services
- Founded: 2012
- Headquarters: 143 Ahmadu Bello Way, Victoria Island, Lagos, Lagos State, Nigeria
- Area served: Nigeria
- Key people: Jani Ibrahim (acting chairman); Akinola George-Taylor (managing director and chief executive officer)
- Products: Banking and financial services
- Total assets: US$1.7+ billion (NGN:483.4 billion) (Dec 2015)
- Number of employees: 4000
- Website: Homepage

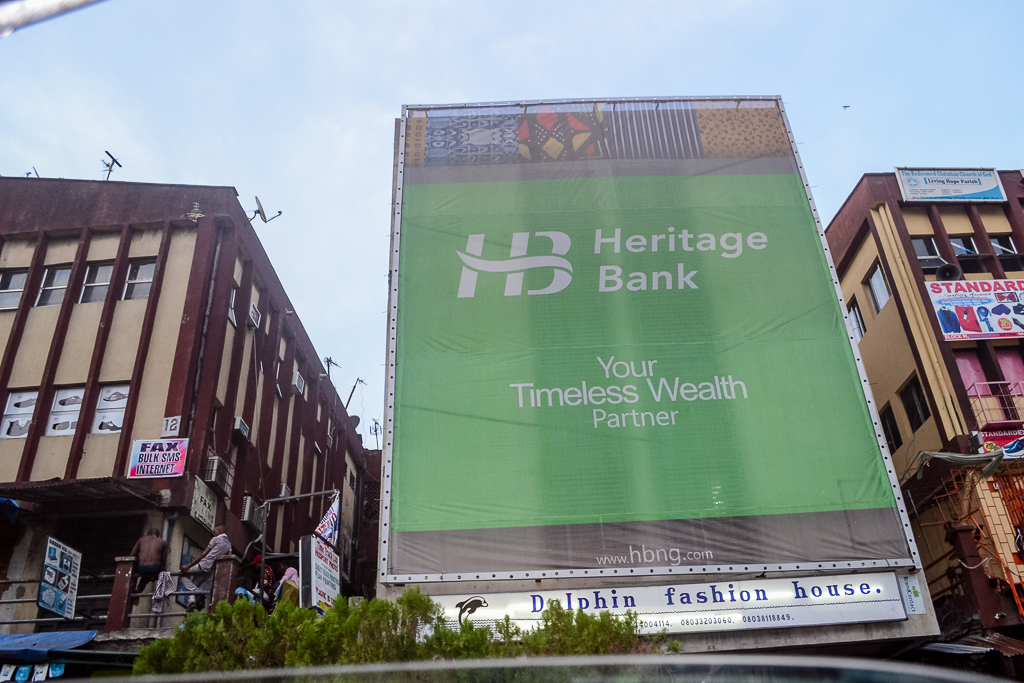
Building of Heritage Bank in Lagos Island

Heritage Bank Plc., usually called Heritage Bank, was a financial services institution. It was one of the commercial banks licensed by the Central Bank of Nigeria, the country's banking regulator, with a national operating license, that offered retail banking, corporate banking, online/internet banking, investment banking and asset management services; its head office was at 143, Ahmadu Bello way, Victoria Island, Lagos, Lagos State, Nigeria. It's banking license was revoked on Monday, June 3rd 2024.

== Overview ==
In 2012, the core investor, IEI Plc, through IEI Investments Limited, acquired the Societe Generale Bank of Nigeria license from the Central Bank of Nigeria. Having fulfilled all required criteria, the bank returned 100% of existing Societe Generale account holders’ money to their owners. Heritage Bank Plc is a large financial services provider in Nigeria. Currently licensed as a National Bank, it offers banking and financial services in the country, including the South, West, Southeast and the North. As of December 2015, the total asset valuation of the bank was estimated at US$1.7+ billion (NGN:483.4 billion). Its shareholders' equity is worth at least US$88 million (NGN:25 billion), the minimum capital requirement by the Central Bank of Nigeria, for national banks.

== History ==
The bank traces its roots to the late 1970s, when it was founded as Societe Generale Bank (Nigeria), by the late Dr. Olusola Saraki. In January 2006, the Central Bank closed down Societe Generale on account of failure to meet new minimum capital requirements of US$155 million (NGN:25 billion) for a National Bank. Societe Generale successfully challenged the closure in court. In December 2012, the Central Bank re-issued Societe Generale's banking license, but as a regional bank. Having acquired the banking license, the new ownership re-branded the bank as Heritage Banking Company Limited and opened for business under the new name on 4 March 2013.

In October 2014, Heritage Banking Company Ltd successfully met the requirements of the Asset Management Corporation of Nigeria (AMCON) and the Central Bank of Nigeria toward owning 100% shares in Enterprise Bank Ltd.

On 27 January 2015, AMCON officially transferred ownership of Enterprise Bank Ltd to Heritage Bank Plc.

== Ownership ==
As of September 2013, the bank's stock is publicly owned by the following corporate entities and individuals:

Heritage Bank Plc stock ownership
Rank	Name of owner	Percentage ownership
1	Heritage Investment Services Limited	80.0
2	Priority shareholders	9.0
3	Other minority shareholders	11.0
	Total	100.00

== Branch network ==
Headquartered in Lagos, Nigeria, Heritage Bank Plc has 127 branches and 202 automated banking centers with over 350 ATMs in all states of the federation and the Federal Capital Territory.

== Governance ==
Jani Ibrahim FNSE, FAEng., OON, MNI, a non-executive director, serves as the acting chairman of the seven-person board of directors. The managing director and chief executive officer is Akinola George-Taylor.

== Acquiring Enterprise Bank ==
In October 2014, Heritage Bank acquired 100% shareholding in Enterprise Bank Limited, a nationalized financial services provider with over 160 branches and US$1.6 billion in assets. Heritage paid AMCON US$340 million (NGN:56.1 billion), in cash, for the acquisition. Heritage Investment Services Limited, the investment arm of Heritage Banking Company Limited, was the winning bidder out of 24 Nigerian and International companies who competed for the acquisition of Enterprise Bank.

== Operating License Revoked ==
In June 2024, the Central Bank of Nigeria revoked the operating license of Heritage Bank (CBN), citing that it failed to comply with operating best practices. The Nigeria Deposit Insurance Corporation was appointed as the liquidator of the bank under Section 12 (2) of BOFIA, 2020

== See also ==
- Economy of Nigeria
- List of banks in Nigeria
