= Keystone Bank Limited =

Nigerian commercial bank

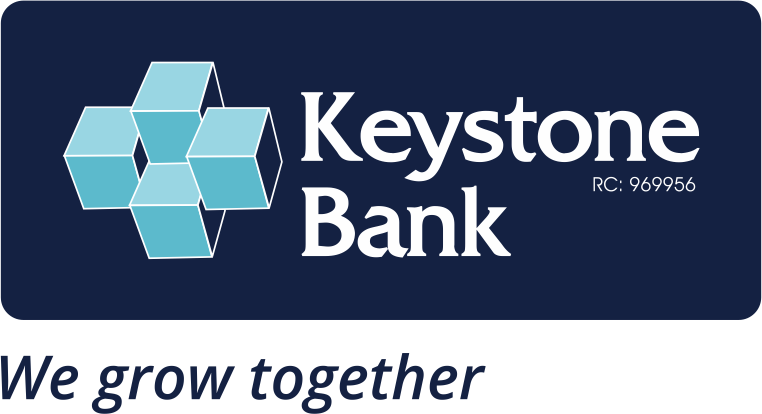
- Type: Private
- Industry: Banking
- Founded: 2011; 15 years ago
- Headquarters: Victoria Island, Lagos, Nigeria
- Key people: Hassan Imam (Managing director and CEO); Nnenna Anyim Okoro (Executive director)
- Products: Loans, credit cards, savings, investments, online banking
- Total assets: US$ 1.916 billion / NGN 307.5 billion
- Website: www.keystonebankng.com

Keystone Bank Limited, is a commercial bank in Nigeria. The bank is one of the commercial banks licensed by the Central Bank of Nigeria, the national banking regulator.

== Overview ==
Keystone Bank offers banking services to large corporations, public institutions, small to medium enterprises (SMEs) and individuals. The bank is a large financial services provider in Nigeria. As of December 2012, the bank's total assets were valued at US$1.916 billion (NGN:307.5 billion), with shareholders' equity valued at about US$213.3 million (NGN:34.23 billion).

== History ==
On Friday 5 August 2011, Keystone Bank Limited was issued a commercial banking license by the Central Bank of Nigeria (CBN). On the same day, CBN revoked the banking license of Bank PHB. Keystone Bank assumed the assets and some liabilities of the now defunct Bank PHB.

On 22 March 2017, Asset Management Company of Nigeria announced that Keystone bank had been sold to investors for 25 billion naira ($81.5 million). It was sold to Sigma Golf-Riverbank consortium.

On February 11, 2025, the Lagos State Special Offences Court ordered the forfeiture of 6.3 billion units of ordinary shares in Keystone Bank Limited to the Federal Government of Nigeria. The decision followed a guilty plea by Sigma Golf Nigeria Limited in a ₦20 billion fraud case filed by the Economic and Financial Crimes Commission (EFCC).

== Ownership ==
Effexctive 11 February 2025, the bank's shares are 100 percent owned by the Federal Government of Nigeria.

== Keystone Bank Group ==
The bank together with its onshore and offshore subsidiaries, constitute the Keystone Bank Group. The bank's subsidiaries include the following:

- Global Bank Liberia – Monrovia, Liberia
- Keystone Insurance – Lagos, Nigeria

== Branch network ==
According to its website, the bank maintains a network of over 150 business offices and locations in all the states of Nigeria.

Some of its products offered to the public includes; QuickSave/ QuickSave Plus, Paytime Accounts, Partner Plus, Active Dom/Dom Extra, Growbiz Account, Future Account, NIDA etc.

== Governance ==
As of October 2026, the chairperson of the bank is Ada Chukwudozie Npom. The managing director and chief executive officer of the bank is Hassan Imam. Both sit on the 13-person Board of Directors.

== Awards ==
The Bank was awarded Retail Bank of the Year at the African Industrial and Development Conference and Awards (AIDCA) in 2024.

It got the Nigeria’s Most Innovative Retail Bank of the year, and the Africa’s Best Customer Service Provider respectively in 2018 at the International Bankers' Award Ceremony.

== See also ==
- Economy of Nigeria
- Orient Bank
- List of banks in Nigeria
