= 2016 African Rally Championship =

36th season of motorsport event

2016 African Rally season

Seasons
- ← 2015 2017 →

The 2016 African Rally Championship was the 36th season of the African Rally Championship (ARC), the FIA regional zone rally championship for the African continent. The season began on February 11 in the Côte d'Ivoire, and ended on November 13 in Madagascar, after seven events.

For the second year running a Kenyan driver claimed the title. Mitsubishi Lancer driver Don Smith won the title in dominant fashion, taking victory in Tanzania and finishing second in five other rallies, wrapping up the title early, leading to no African Championship competitors entering the series finale in Madagascar. Star of the championship was Zambian driver Muna Singh Jr., winning in South Africa, Zambia and Rwanda. Singh was unable to finish any other rally and was overcome by Smith's consistency. Fellow Zambian driver Ismail Shermohamed was third in the title, taking victory in Uganda.

== Event calendar and results ==
The 2016 African Rally Championship was as follows:

Round	Rally name	Podium finishers				Statistics			
Round	Rally name	Rank	Driver	Car	Time	Stages	Length	Starters	Finishers
1	(Ivory Coast) Rallye Bandama - Côte d'Ivoire (11–13 February)	1	(Ivory Coast) Gary Chaynes	Mitsubishi Lancer Evolution IX	2:24:44.7	12	238.31 km	27	14
1	(Ivory Coast) Rallye Bandama - Côte d'Ivoire (11–13 February)	2	(France) Marc Molinié	Mitsubishi Lancer Evolution VII	2:36:49.1	12	238.31 km	27	14
1	(Ivory Coast) Rallye Bandama - Côte d'Ivoire (11–13 February)	3	(France) Loïc Malherbe	Subaru Impreza STi N10	2:43:45.8	12	238.31 km	27	14
2	Sasol Rally South Africa (22–23 April)	1	(South Africa) Leeroy Poulter	Toyota Yaris S2000	2:30:02.0	14	221.55 km	27	19
2	Sasol Rally South Africa (22–23 April)	2	(South Africa) Giniel de Villiers	Toyota Yaris S2000	2:32:24.7	14	221.55 km	27	19
2	Sasol Rally South Africa (22–23 April)	3	(South Africa) Guy Botterill	Toyota Etios R2	2:43:41.7	14	221.55 km	27	19
3	Zambia International Rally (27–29 May)	1	(Zambia) Jassy Singh	Subaru Impreza STi N14	2:14:50			29	19
3	Zambia International Rally (27–29 May)	2	(Zambia) Muna Singh, Jr.	Subaru Impreza STi N14	2:15:01			29	19
3	Zambia International Rally (27–29 May)	3	(Zambia) Zubair Essa	Subaru Impreza STi N16	2:21:51			29	19
4	Oryx Energies Rally of Tanzania (9–10 July)	1	(Tanzania) Randeep Singh Birdi	Mitsubishi Lancer Evolution IX	2:15:25		248.71 km	26	12
4	Oryx Energies Rally of Tanzania (9–10 July)	2	(Tanzania) Jamil Khan	Mitsubishi Lancer Evolution X	2:17:36		248.71 km	26	12
4	Oryx Energies Rally of Tanzania (9–10 July)	3	(Tanzania) Gerard Miller	Mitsubishi Lancer Evolution IX	2:17:39		248.71 km	26	12
5	Rwanda Mountain Gorilla Rally (12–14 August)	1	(Burundi) Valery Bukera	Subaru Impreza STi N12	1:48:01	14	201.06 km	23	13
5	Rwanda Mountain Gorilla Rally (12–14 August)	2	(Zambia) Muna Singh, Jr.	Subaru Impreza STi N14	1:49:06	14	201.06 km	23	13
5	Rwanda Mountain Gorilla Rally (12–14 August)	3	(Uganda) Hassan Alwi	Subaru Impreza STi N14	1:54:43	14	201.06 km	23	13
6	V-Power Pearl of Africa Uganda Rally (16–18 September)	1	(Uganda) Hassan Alwi	Subaru Impreza STi N14	2:41:03.5	9	232.76 km	44	20
6	V-Power Pearl of Africa Uganda Rally (16–18 September)	2	(Uganda) Arthur Blick	Subaru Impreza STi N10	2:41:53.6	9	232.76 km	44	20
6	V-Power Pearl of Africa Uganda Rally (16–18 September)	3	(Cyprus) Christakis Fitidis	Mitsubishi Lancer Evolution X	2:48:58.0	9	232.76 km	44	20
7	Rallye International de Madagascar (11–13 November)	1	(Madagascar) Tahina Razafinjoelina	Subaru Impreza STi N10	3:13:28	14	193.75 km	34	9
7	Rallye International de Madagascar (11–13 November)	2	(Madagascar) Herivonjy Solofonirina	Foton Tunland	3:20:02	14	193.75 km	34	9
7	Rallye International de Madagascar (11–13 November)	3	(Madagascar) Tovo Rakotojohary	Renault Clio 16S	3:24:43	14	193.75 km	34	9

== Championship standings ==
The 2016 African Rally Championship points are as follows:

Pos.	Driver	Vehicle	(Ivory Coast) BAN	(South Africa) RSA	(Zambia) ZAM	(Tanzania) TAN	(Rwanda) RMG	(Uganda) PoA	(Madagascar) MAD	Total
1	(Kenya) Don Smith	Mitsubishi Lancer Evolution X	2	2	2	1	2	2		115
2	(Zambia) Muna Singh, Jr.	Subaru Impreza STi N14		1	1	Ret	1	Ret		75
3	(Zambia) Ismail Shermohamed	Toyota Run-X; Ford Fiesta R2		4	Ret		3	1		55
4	(Ivory Coast) Gary Chaynes	Mitsubishi Lancer Evolution IX	1							25
5	(Uganda) Abdul Ssempebwa	Subaru Impreza WRX STi					4	Ret		12

Key
Colour	Result
Gold	Winner
Silver	2nd place
Bronze	3rd place
Green	Points finish
Blue	Non-points finish
Blue	Non-classified finish (NC)
Purple	Did not finish (Ret)
Black	Excluded (EX)
Black	Disqualified (DSQ)
White	Did not start (DNS)
White	Cancelled (C)
Blank	Withdrew entry from the event (WD)
