= 2019 African Rally Championship =

39th season of motorsport event

The 2019 African Rally Championship was the 39th season of the African Rally Championship (ARC), the FIA regional zone rally championship for the African continent. The season began on February 21 in the Côte d'Ivoire, and ended on October 10 in Rwanda, after seven events.

Skoda Fabia driver Manvir Singh Baryan won his third consecutive title. Baryan again won three of the seven rallies, taking victory in the Rallye Côte d'Ivoire, Zambia International Rally and Pearl of Africa Uganda Rally. Baryan dominated the title, winning with 201 points compared to Zambian Ford driver Leeroy Gomes 88 points. Baryan's title extended the run of Kenyan success to five consecutive years.

Kenyan Mitsubishi driver and winner of the Safari Rally, Baldev Chager was third in the championship on 56 points, six points ahead of South African Toyota driver Hergen Fekken. Fekken won the Rally of South Africa. Baryan wrapped up the title early in August after winning the Pearl of Africa Uganda Rally. The two subsequent rallies in Tanzania and Rwanda were won by local drivers who were not chasing the African title.

== Event calendar and results ==
There were seven rallies in the 2019 African Rally Championship. The only change from the 2018 schedule was the Safari Rally that moved from March to July:

Round	Rally name	Podium finishers				Statistics			
Round	Rally name	Rank	Driver	Car	Time	Stages	Length	Starters	Finishers
1	(Ivory Coast) Rallye Bandama - Côte d'Ivoire (21–23 February)	1	(Kenya) Manvir Singh Baryan	Škoda Fabia R5	2:51:30.28	13	268.80 km	31	17
1	(Ivory Coast) Rallye Bandama - Côte d'Ivoire (21–23 February)	2	(Ivory Coast) Maxime Abondio	Mitsubishi Lancer Evolution IX	3:08:12.04	13	268.80 km	31	17
1	(Ivory Coast) Rallye Bandama - Côte d'Ivoire (21–23 February)	3	(France) Bernard Piallat	Can-Am Maverick X3	3:09:04.67	13	268.80 km	31	17
2	Rally of South Africa (26–27 April)	1	(South Africa) Hergen Fekken	Toyota Etios R4	2:19:30.1	15	193.59 km	20	14
2	Rally of South Africa (26–27 April)	2	(Kenya) Manvir Singh Baryan	Škoda Fabia R5	2:20:09.0	15	193.59 km	20	14
2	Rally of South Africa (26–27 April)	3	(South Africa) Guy Botterill	Toyota Etios R2	2:27:18.3	15	193.59 km	20	14
3	Gomes Zambia International Rally (7–9 June)	1	(Kenya) Manvir Singh Baryan	Škoda Fabia R5	2:21:37.0	18	194.42 km	24	15
3	Gomes Zambia International Rally (7–9 June)	2	(Zambia) Leeroy Gomes	Ford Fiesta R5	2:23:27.0	18	194.42 km	24	15
3	Gomes Zambia International Rally (7–9 June)	3	(Kenya) Onkar Rai	Škoda Fabia R5	2:24:13.0	18	194.42 km	24	15
4	(Kenya) Safari Rally (5–7 July)	1	(Kenya) Baldev Chager	Mitsubishi Lancer Evolution X	2:44:50.0	14	262.93 km	48	29
4	(Kenya) Safari Rally (5–7 July)	2	(Kenya) Carl Tundo	Mitsubishi Lancer Evolution X	2:45:23.6	14	262.93 km	48	29
4	(Kenya) Safari Rally (5–7 July)	3	(Kenya) Manvir Singh Baryan	Škoda Fabia R5	2:56:23.8	14	262.93 km	48	29
5	Pearl of Africa Uganda Rally (2–4 August)	1	(Kenya) Manvir Singh Baryan	Škoda Fabia R5	2:02:30.1	10	210.98 km	45	20
5	Pearl of Africa Uganda Rally (2–4 August)	2	(Uganda) Yasin Nasser	Subaru Impreza WRX STi 4 D	2:16:07.8	10	210.98 km	45	20
5	Pearl of Africa Uganda Rally (2–4 August)	3	(Uganda) Arthur Blick	Mitsubishi Lancer Evolution X	2:16:11.7	10	210.98 km	45	20
6	Oryx Energies Rally of Tanzania (13–15 September)	1	(Tanzania) Dharam Pandya	Subaru WRX STI	2:29:00.8	10	201.60 km	16	8
6	Oryx Energies Rally of Tanzania (13–15 September)	2	(Tanzania) Tufail Tufail	Subaru Impreza GC8	2:35:19.3	10	201.60 km	16	8
6	Oryx Energies Rally of Tanzania (13–15 September)	3	(Tanzania) Mandeep Singh Dhani	Subaru Impreza STi N10	2:37:40.2	10	201.60 km	16	8
7	Rwanda Mountain Gorilla Rally (4–6 October)	1	(Rwanda) Jean-Claude Gakwaya	Subaru Impreza STi N11	1:35:09	9	138.76 km	10	6
7	Rwanda Mountain Gorilla Rally (4–6 October)	2	(Belgium) Jean-Jean Giesen	Toyota Celica	1:45:24	9	138.76 km	10	6
7	Rwanda Mountain Gorilla Rally (4–6 October)	3	(Burundi) Christian Remezo	Toyota Celica	1:52:00	9	138.76 km	10	6

== Championship standings ==
The 2019 African Rally Championship points are as follows:

Pos.	Driver	Vehicle	(Ivory Coast) BAN	(South Africa) RSA	(Zambia) ZAM	(Kenya) SAF	(Uganda) PoA	(Tanzania) TAN	(Rwanda) RMG	Total
1	(Kenya) Manvir Singh Baryan	Škoda Fabia R5	1	2	1	3	1			201
2	(Zambia) Leeroy Gomes	Ford Fiesta R5		4	2	4				88
3	(Kenya) Baldev Chager	Mitsubishi Lancer Evolution X			6	1				56
4	(South Africa) Hergen Fekken	Toyota Etios R4		1						50
4	(Kenya) Carl Tundo	Mitsubishi Lancer Evolution X			5	2				50
6	(Ivory Coast) Cyril Bottari	Subaru Impreza STi N12B	2							36
7	(Kenya) Onkar Rai	Škoda Fabia R5			3	Ret				30
8	(Tanzania) Dharam Pandya	Subaru WRX STI			Ret			1		25
9	(Uganda) Yasin Nasser	Subaru Impreza WRX STi 4 D				8	2			24
9	(South Africa) Ismail Shermohammed	Toyota Yaris S2000		5						24
9	(Zambia) Muna Singh Jnr	Subaru Impreza STi N16			4					24
12	(Tanzania) Altaaf Munge	Mitsubishi Lancer Evolution X						2		18
13	(Cyprus) Christakis Fitidis	Mitsubishi Lancer Evolution X				13	3			17
13	(Zambia) Jassy Singh	Subaru Impreza STi N14				5				17
13	(Kenya) Tejveer Rai	Mitsubishi Lancer Evolution X			9	7				17
16	(Rwanda) Giancarlo Davite	Mitsubishi Lancer Evolution X				6			Ret	16
17	(Zambia) Kleevan Gomes	Mitsubishi Lancer Evolution IX			7					14
18	(Uganda) Abdul Katete	Subaru Impreza				Ret	4			12
18	(Zambia) Siddarth Joshi	Mitsubishi Lancer Evolution IX			8					12
20	(Uganda) Duncan Mubiru	Mitsubishi Lancer Evolution X Subaru Impreza WRX STi 4 D				9	5			10
20	(Kenya) Minesh Rathod	Mitsubishi Lancer Evolution IX				10				10
22	(South Africa) Guy Botterill	Toyota Etios R2; Toyota Etios R4		3	10					8
23	(Kenya) Nzioka Waita	Mitsubishi Lancer Evolution IX				11				7
24	(Kenya) Izhar Mirza	Mitsubishi Lancer Evolution X				14				6
25	(Kenya) Jonathan Somen	Ford Escort Mk.II				12				5
26	(Kenya) Hardev Sira	Ford Escort Mk.I				15				1

Key
Colour	Result
Gold	Winner
Silver	2nd place
Bronze	3rd place
Green	Points finish
Blue	Non-points finish
Blue	Non-classified finish (NC)
Purple	Did not finish (Ret)
Black	Excluded (EX)
Black	Disqualified (DSQ)
White	Did not start (DNS)
White	Cancelled (C)
Blank	Withdrew entry from the event (WD)
