= Rwanda Mountain Gorilla Rally =

International rallying event

The Rwanda Mountain Gorilla Rally, known originally as the Fraternity Rally, is an international rallying event organised by the Rwanda Automobile Club. The rally is based in the Rwandan capital of Kigali. The event is a round of the African Rally Championship and the Rwandan National Rally Championship.

The Fraternity Rally was first run in 1999 as motorsport re-established itself after the Genocide against the Tutsi. It began as a cross-border rally that began in Kampala, Uganda before finishing in Kigali. The rally became part of the African championship the following year, restoring a Rwandan presence to the African championship absent since 1988. Over time the Ugandan portion of the event faded and the rally was renamed the Rwanda Mountain Gorilla Rally 2002.

Burundi driver Rudy Cantanhede is the most successful driver in the rallies history with three wins to his credit. Italian born local driver Giancarlo Davite has two wins to his credit. All bar two events have been won by drivers of Subaru Imprezas.

== List of winners ==
Sourced in part from:

Year	Winner	Car
Fraternity Rally
2000	(Uganda) Charles Muhanji	Subaru Impreza WRX
2001	(South Africa) Schalk Burger Sr.	Subaru Impreza WRX
Rwanda Mountain Gorilla Rally
2002	(South Africa) Johnny Gemmell	Subaru Impreza WRX
2003	(Spain) Fernando Rueda	Mitsubishi Lancer Evo VI
2004	(Burundi) Rudy Cantanhede	Mitsubishi Lancer Evo III
2005	(Uganda) Riyaz Kurji	Subaru Impreza WRX
2006	(Uganda) Riyaz Kurji	Subaru Impreza WRX
2007	(Zimbabwe) Conrad Rautenbach	Subaru Impreza WRX
2008	(Burundi) Rudy Cantanhede	Subaru Impreza WRX
2009	(Rwanda) Giancarlo Davite	Subaru Impreza WRX STi
2010	(Burundi) Rudy Cantanhede	Subaru Impreza WRX
2011	(Madagascar) Jean-Yves Ranarivelo	Subaru Impreza WRX STi
2012	(Cyprus) Elefter Mitraros	Subaru Impreza WRX STi
2013	(Rwanda) Giancarlo Davite	Subaru Impreza WRX
2014	(Zambia) Mohammed Essa	Subaru Impreza WRX STI
2015	(Kenya) Jaspreet Singh Chatthe	Mitsubishi Lancer Evo X
2016	(Burundi) Valery Bukera	Subaru Impreza STi N12
2017	(Kenya) Manvir Singh Baryan	Škoda Fabia R5
2018	(Italy) Giancarlo Davite	Mitsubishi Lancer Evo X R4
2019	(Rwanda) Jean-Claude Gakwaya	Subaru Impreza STi N10
2021	(Kenya) Carl Tundo	Volkswagen Polo GTI R5
2022	(Kenya) Karan Patel	Ford Fiesta R5
2023	(Kenya) Karan Patel	Ford Fiesta R5
2024	(Kenya) Karan Patel	Škoda Fabia R5
2025	(Kenya) Samman Singh Vohra	Škoda Fabia Rally2 evo
2026	(Kenya) Karan Patel	Škoda Fabia R5
