= 2018 African Rally Championship =

38th season of motorsport event

The 2018 African Rally Championship was the 38th season of the African Rally Championship (ARC), the FIA regional zone rally championship for the African continent. The season began on February 23 in the Côte d'Ivoire, and ended on October 7 in Rwanda, after seven events.

Skoda Fabia driver Manvir Singh Baryan won his second consecutive title. Baryan again won four of the seven rallies, taking victory in South Africa, Zambia, Uganda and Tanzania. Baryan won the title by 56 points over Mitsubishi Lancer driver, Italian-Kenyan Piero Cannobio who had only two top-three finishes amongst ARC competitors. Baryan's second title was the fourth consecutive title won by Kenyan drivers.

== Event calendar and results ==
There were seven rallies in the 2018 African Rally Championship. The only change from the 2017 schedule was the previously season-ending Zambia International Motor Rally moved from October to June, becoming the fourth round of the championship:

Round	Rally name	Podium finishers				Statistics			
Round	Rally name	Rank	Driver	Car	Time	Stages	Length	Starters	Finishers
1	(Ivory Coast) Rallye Bandama - Côte d'Ivoire (23–25 February)	1	(Ivory Coast) Gary Chaynes	Mitsubishi Lancer Evolution X	2:20:59.9	12	231.25 km	34	15
1	(Ivory Coast) Rallye Bandama - Côte d'Ivoire (23–25 February)	2	(France) Jeremie Warnia	Yamaha YXZ 1000R	2:28:07.2	12	231.25 km	34	15
1	(Ivory Coast) Rallye Bandama - Côte d'Ivoire (23–25 February)	3	(France) Stéphane Peterhansel	Yamaha YXZ 1000R	2:30:28.3	12	231.25 km	34	15
2	(Kenya) Safari Rally (16–18 March)	1	(Kenya) Carl Tundo	Mitsubishi Lancer Evolution X	1:55:05.8	9	187.61 km	35	13
2	(Kenya) Safari Rally (16–18 March)	2	(Kenya) Baldev Chager	Mitsubishi Lancer Evolution X	2:04:34.2	9	187.61 km	35	13
2	(Kenya) Safari Rally (16–18 March)	3	(Uganda) Jas Mangat	Mitsubishi Lancer Evolution X	2:05:27.3	9	187.61 km	35	13
3	(South Africa) York Rally (19–21 April)	1	(Kenya) Manvir Singh Baryan	Škoda Fabia R5	2:47:34.9	15	220.50 km	30	17
3	(South Africa) York Rally (19–21 April)	2	(South Africa) Guy Botterill	Toyota Etios R2	2:50:57.9	15	220.50 km	30	17
3	(South Africa) York Rally (19–21 April)	3	(South Africa) Matthew Vacy-Lyle	Toyota Etios R2	2:56:16.6	15	220.50 km	30	17
4	Gomes Zambia International Rally (22–24 June)	1	(Kenya) Manvir Singh Baryan	Škoda Fabia R5	2:38:26	16	218.54 km	23	14
4	Gomes Zambia International Rally (22–24 June)	2	(Zambia) Muna Singh, Jr.	Subaru Impreza STi N14	2:43:47	16	218.54 km	23	14
4	Gomes Zambia International Rally (22–24 June)	3	(Tanzania) Ahmed Huwel	Ford Fiesta Proto	2:46:07	16	218.54 km	23	14
5	Pearl of Africa Uganda Rally (20–22 July)	1	(Kenya) Manvir Singh Baryan	Škoda Fabia R5	2:26:03.5	10	210.98 km	46	22
5	Pearl of Africa Uganda Rally (20–22 July)	2	(Uganda) Ronald Sebuguzi	Mitsubishi Lancer Evolution X	2:30:11.6	10	210.98 km	46	22
5	Pearl of Africa Uganda Rally (20–22 July)	3	(Uganda) Jas Mangat	Mitsubishi Lancer Evolution X	2:37:05.1	10	210.98 km	46	22
6	Oryx Energies Rally of Tanzania (31 August–2 September)	1	(Kenya) Manvir Singh Baryan	Škoda Fabia R5	1:42:16	8	207.28 km	27	15
6	Oryx Energies Rally of Tanzania (31 August–2 September)	2	(Tanzania) Randeep Singh Birdi	Mitsubishi Lancer Evolution IX	1:48:49	8	207.28 km	27	15
6	Oryx Energies Rally of Tanzania (31 August–2 September)	3	(Tanzania) Kleevan Gomes	Mitsubishi Lancer Evolution IX	1:53:25	8	207.28 km	27	15
7	Rwanda Mountain Gorilla Rally (5–7 October)	1	(Belgium) Giancarlo Davite	Mitsubishi Lancer Evolution X	2:00:07.0	11	178.60 km	16	10
7	Rwanda Mountain Gorilla Rally (5–7 October)	2	(Belgium) Rudy Cantanhede	Mitsubishi Lancer Evolution IX	2:02:14.1	11	178.60 km	16	10
7	Rwanda Mountain Gorilla Rally (5–7 October)	3	(Rwanda) Jean-Claude Gakwaya	Subaru Impreza STi N11	2:12:16.0	11	178.60 km	16	10

== Championship standings ==
The 2018 African Rally Championship points are as follows:

Pos.	Driver	Vehicle	(Ivory Coast) BAN	(Kenya) SAF	(South Africa) YOR	(Zambia) ZAM	(Uganda) PoA	(Tanzania) TAN	(Rwanda) RMG	Total
1	(Kenya) Manvir Singh Baryan	Škoda Fabia R5		Ret	1	1	1	1		100
2	(Italy) Piero Cannobio	Mitsubishi Lancer Evolution IX; Mitsubishi Lancer Evolution X	2	13	Ret	5	Ret	3		44

Key
Colour	Result
Gold	Winner
Silver	2nd place
Bronze	3rd place
Green	Points finish
Blue	Non-points finish
Blue	Non-classified finish (NC)
Purple	Did not finish (Ret)
Black	Excluded (EX)
Black	Disqualified (DSQ)
White	Did not start (DNS)
White	Cancelled (C)
Blank	Withdrew entry from the event (WD)
