= 2006 African Rally Championship =

International rally championship

The 2006 African Rally Championship season (ARC) was an international rally championship organized by the FIA. The champion was Belgian driver Patrick Emontspool.

== Calendar ==
| Date | Event | Winner |
|---|---|---|
| February 17–19 | Rally of Tanzania | (Belgium) Patrick Emontspool |
| March 24–26 | Safari Rally Kenya | (Kenya) Azar Anwar |
| April 21–23 | Pearl of Africa Uganda Rally | (Uganda) Riyaz Kurji |
| May 26–28 | Rally of South Africa | (Belgium) Patrick Emontspool |
| June 23–25 | Dunlop Zimbabwe Challenge Rally | (Zimbabwe) Jamie Whyte |
| July 12–23 | Zambia International Rally | (Zimbabwe) Richard Robinson |
| September 1–3 | Rwanda Mountain Gorilla Rally | (Uganda) Riyaz Kurji |
| November 24–26 | (Ivory Coast) Rallye Bandama Côte d'Ivoire | (Belgium) Patrick Emontspool |

== Points ==
| # | Driver | Car | Event | | | | | | | | Points |
| # | Driver | Car | TAN (Tanzania) | SAF (Kenya) | UGA (Uganda) | RSA (South Africa) | ZBW (Zimbabwe) | ZAM (Zambia) | RUA (Rwanda) | CDI (Ivory Coast) | Points |
|---|---|---|---|---|---|---|---|---|---|---|---|
| 1. | (Belgium) Patrick Emontspool | Subaru | 10 | 0 | 0 | 4 | 4 | 6 | 6 | 10 | 40 |
| 2. | (Uganda) Riyaz Kurji | Subaru | 0 | 0 | 10 | 0 | 0 | 0 | 10 | 0 | 20 |
| 3. | (Zimbabwe) Richard Robinson | Mitsubishi | 3 | 1 | 8 | 0 | 0 | 8 | 0 | 0 | 20 |
| 4. | (Zimbabwe) Jamie Whyte | Mitsubishi | 0 | 3 | 0 | 1 | 8 | 5 | 0 | 0 | 17 |
| 5. | (Kenya) Azar Anwar | Mitsubishi | 0 | 10 | 5 | 0 | 0 | 0 | 0 | 0 | 15 |
| 6. | (Zambia) Paul Monge | Subaru | 8 | 0 | 1 | 0 | 0 | 3 | 0 | 0 | 12 |
| 7. | (Zambia) Muna Singh | Subaru | 0 | 0 | 3 | 0 | 6 | 0 | 0 | 0 | 9 |
| | (Tanzania) Omar Bakhresa | Subaru | 5 | 0 | 4 | 0 | 0 | 0 | 0 | 0 | 9 |
| 9. | (Tanzania) Pano Calavrias | Subaru | 4 | 0 | 2 | 0 | 0 | 0 | 0 | 0 | 6 |
| 10. | (Uganda) Emmanuel Katto | Subaru | 0 | 4 | 0 | 0 | 0 | 0 | 0 | 0 | 4 |
