= 2014 African Rally Championship =

34th season of motorsport event

2014 African Rally season

Seasons
- ← 2013 2015 →

The 2014 African Rally Championship was the 34th season of the African Rally Championship (ARC). This championship was the FIA regional zone rally championship for the African continent. The season began March 14 in Côte d'Ivoire, and ended November 9 in Madagascar, after eight events.

After a season long battle, Côte d'Ivoire driver Gary Chaynes won the championship by a single point from Zambian driver Mohamed Essa.

== Event calendar and results ==
The 2014 African Rally Championship was as follows:

Round	Rally name	Podium finishers				Statistics			
Round	Rally name	Rank	Driver	Car	Time	Stages	Length	Starters	Finishers
1	(Ivory Coast) Rallye Bandama Cote d'Ivoire (14–16 March)	1	(Ivory Coast) Gary Chaynes	Mitsubishi Lancer Evolution IX	2:12:31.3	11	241.25 km	25	15
1	(Ivory Coast) Rallye Bandama Cote d'Ivoire (14–16 March)	2	(Ivory Coast) Moriféré Soumaoro	Mitsubishi Lancer Evolution X	2:13:04.8	11	241.25 km	25	15
1	(Ivory Coast) Rallye Bandama Cote d'Ivoire (14–16 March)	3	(France) Marc Molinié	Mitsubishi Lancer Evolution VII	2:19:49.6	11	241.25 km	25	15
2	(South Africa) Sasol Rally (11–12 April)	1	(South Africa) Leeroy Poulter	Toyota Yaris S2000	2:13:42.4	14	202.35 km	44	32
2	(South Africa) Sasol Rally (11–12 April)	2	(South Africa) Enzo Kuun	Ford Fiesta S2000	2:15:28.9	14	202.35 km	44	32
2	(South Africa) Sasol Rally (11–12 April)	3	(South Africa) Hergen Fekken	Toyota Yaris S2000	2:21:39.4	14	202.35 km	44	32
3	Zambia International Rally (16–18 May)	1	(Zambia) Mohammed Essa	Subaru Impreza WRX STI	3:03:00			21	12
3	Zambia International Rally (16–18 May)	2	(Kenya) Jaspreet Singh Chatthe	Mitsubishi Lancer Evolution X	3:05:38			21	12
3	Zambia International Rally (16–18 May)	3	(Ivory Coast) Gary Chaynes	Mitsubishi Lancer Evolution X	3:07:47			21	12
4	Rally of Tanzania (13–15 June)	1	(Kenya) Jaspreet Singh Chatthe	Mitsubishi Lancer Evolution X	2:09:19	14	211.88 km	19	8
4	Rally of Tanzania (13–15 June)	2	(Tanzania) Rajpal Singh Dhani	Subaru Impreza WRX	2:18:40	14	211.88 km	19	8
4	Rally of Tanzania (13–15 June)	3	(Tanzania) Tufail Tufail	Subaru Impreza WRX	2:23:46	14	211.88 km	19	8
5	Rwanda Mountain Gorilla Rally (18–20 July)	1	(Zambia) Mohammed Essa	Subaru Impreza WRX STI	2:57:24			18	8
5	Rwanda Mountain Gorilla Rally (18–20 July)	2	(Ivory Coast) Gary Chaynes	Mitsubishi Lancer Evolution X	3:06:31			18	8
5	Rwanda Mountain Gorilla Rally (18–20 July)	3	(Uganda) Duncan Mubiru	Subaru Impreza WRX STI	3:09:12			18	8
6	Pearl of Africa Uganda Rally (15–17 August)	1	(Kenya) Rajbir Rai	Mitsubishi Lancer Evolution X	3:02:45	10	271.76 km	36	23
6	Pearl of Africa Uganda Rally (15–17 August)	2	(Ivory Coast) Gary Chaynes	Mitsubishi Lancer Evolution X	3:02:47	10	271.76 km	36	23
6	Pearl of Africa Uganda Rally (15–17 August)	3	(Zambia) Mohammed Essa	Subaru Impreza WRX STI	3:03:18	10	271.76 km	36	23
7	Kenya Safari Rally (12–14 September)	1	(Kenya) Baldev Chager	Mitsubishi Lancer Evolution X	2:47.13	13	224.34 km	61	35
7	Kenya Safari Rally (12–14 September)	2	(Kenya) Carl Tundo	Proton Satria Neo	2:48.48	13	224.34 km	61	35
7	Kenya Safari Rally (12–14 September)	3	(Kenya) Manvir Singh Baryan	Subaru Impreza WRX STi	2:52.23	13	224.34 km	61	35
8	Rallye International de Madagascar (7–9 November)	1	(Madagascar) Mamy Patrick Solofonirina	Mitsubishi Lancer Evolution X	2:59:43	16	209.10 km	34	18
8	Rallye International de Madagascar (7–9 November)	2	(Zambia) Mohammed Essa	Subaru Impreza WRX STI	3:05:33	16	209.10 km	34	18
8	Rallye International de Madagascar (7–9 November)	3	(Madagascar) Rivo Aina Randrianarivony	Subaru Impreza WRX STI	3:06:55	16	209.10 km	34	18

== Championship standings ==
The 2014 African Rally Championship points were as follows:

Pos.	Driver	Vehicle	(Ivory Coast) BAN	(South Africa) RSA	(Zambia) ZAM	(Tanzania) TAN	(Rwanda) RMG	(Uganda) PoA	(Kenya) SAF	(Madagascar) MAD	Total
1	(Ivory Coast) Gary Chaynes	Mitsubishi Lancer Evo IX	1	2	3	Ret	2	1	Ret	2	119
2	(Zambia) Mohamed Essa	Subaru Impreza WRX STI		1	1	Ret	1	2		1	118
3	(Kenya) Jaspreet Singh Chatthe	Mitsubishi Lancer Evo X	Ret	3	2	1		Ret	Ret		58
4	(Kenya) Manvir Singh Baryan	Subaru Impreza WRX STI						3	1		40
5	(Italy) Giancarlo Davite	Subaru Impreza WRX STI	3	Ret	4	Ret	Ret	4			39
6	(Ivory Coast) Moriféré Soumaoro	Mitsubishi Lancer Evo X	2								18
6	(Uganda) Haji Abdu Sempebwa	Subaru Impreza WRX				2	Ret	Ret			18
8	(Zambia) Kenneth Mukosa	Subaru Impreza WRX STI		4							12

Key
Colour	Result
Gold	Winner
Silver	2nd place
Bronze	3rd place
Green	Points finish
Blue	Non-points finish
Blue	Non-classified finish (NC)
Purple	Did not finish (Ret)
Black	Excluded (EX)
Black	Disqualified (DSQ)
White	Did not start (DNS)
White	Cancelled (C)
Blank	Withdrew entry from the event (WD)
