= 2017 African Rally Championship =

37th season of motorsport event

The 2017 African Rally Championship was the 37th season of the African Rally Championship (ARC), the FIA regional zone rally championship for the African continent. The season began on February 10, 2017 in the Côte d'Ivoire, and ended on October 22, 2017 in Zambia, after seven events.

The championship was won for the first time by Skoda Fabia driver Manvir Singh Baryan. Baryan won four of the seven rallies in the championship, winning in Uganda, Rwanda, Tanzania and Zambia after the first three rallies of the season were won by drivers not contesting the championship. Baryan won the title by 35 points over Mitsubishi Lancer driver Leeroy Gomes. Gomes' best performance was a second place points finish at the York Rally in South Africa which was dominated by non-point scoring local drivers. Baryan's victory was the first time a Skoda driver has won the ARC and the first new manufacturer to claim the drivers title since Subaru driver Satwant Singh won in 1996.

== Event calendar and results ==
The 2017 African Rally Championship was as follows:

Round	Rally name	Podium finishers				Statistics			
Round	Rally name	Rank	Driver	Car	Time	Stages	Length	Starters	Finishers
1	(Ivory Coast) Rallye Bandama - Côte d'Ivoire (10–12 February)	1	(Ivory Coast) Moriféré Soumaoro	Mitsubishi Lancer Evolution X	2:32:01.6	12	248.22 km	30	8
1	(Ivory Coast) Rallye Bandama - Côte d'Ivoire (10–12 February)	2	(Ivory Coast) Maxime Abondio	Mitsubishi Lancer Evolution IX	2:40:49.1	12	248.22 km	30	8
1	(Ivory Coast) Rallye Bandama - Côte d'Ivoire (10–12 February)	3	(France) Loïc Malherbe	Subaru Impreza STi	2:48:10.8	12	248.22 km	30	8
2	(Kenya) Safari Rally (17–18 March)	1	(Finland) Tapio Laukkanen	Subaru Impreza WRX STi R4	1:54:12	9	201.54 km	45	30
2	(Kenya) Safari Rally (17–18 March)	2	(Kenya) Ian Duncan	Mitsubishi Lancer Evolution X	1:54:34	9	201.54 km	45	30
2	(Kenya) Safari Rally (17–18 March)	3	(Kenya) Carl Tundo	Mitsubishi Lancer Evolution X	1:56:18	9	201.54 km	45	30
3	(South Africa) York Rally (21–22 April)	1	(South Africa) Japie Van Niekerk	Ford Fiesta S2000	2:24:50.3	14	205.27 km	25	15
3	(South Africa) York Rally (21–22 April)	2	(South Africa) Guy Botterill	Toyota Etios R2	2:31:32.2	14	205.27 km	25	15
3	(South Africa) York Rally (21–22 April)	3	(South Africa) AC Potgieter	Volkswagen Polo R2	2:35:38.4	14	205.27 km	25	15
4	V-Power Pearl of Africa Uganda Rally (30 June–2 July)	1	(Kenya) Manvir Singh Baryan	Škoda Fabia R5	2:09:13	11	231.75 km	51	20
4	V-Power Pearl of Africa Uganda Rally (30 June–2 July)	2	(Cyprus) Christakis Fitidis	Mitsubishi Lancer Evolution X	2:19:04	11	231.75 km	51	20
4	V-Power Pearl of Africa Uganda Rally (30 June–2 July)	3	(Belgium) Giancarlo Davite	Mitsubishi Lancer Evolution X	2:19:51	11	231.75 km	51	20
5	Oryx Energies Rally of Tanzania (4–6 August)	1	(Kenya) Manvir Singh Baryan	Škoda Fabia R5	2:21:35	8	280.34 km	26	13
5	Oryx Energies Rally of Tanzania (4–6 August)	2	(Tanzania) Ahmed Huwel	Ford Fiesta Proto	2:27:52	8	280.34 km	26	13
5	Oryx Energies Rally of Tanzania (4–6 August)	3	(Tanzania) Harinder Singh Deere	Subaru Impreza STi N12	2:32:49	8	280.34 km	26	13
6	Rwanda Mountain Gorilla Rally (8–9 September)	1	(Kenya) Manvir Singh Baryan	Škoda Fabia R5	1:55:10	14	203.95 km	16	9
6	Rwanda Mountain Gorilla Rally (8–9 September)	2	(Belgium) Giancarlo Davite	Mitsubishi Lancer Evolution X	2:00:07	14	203.95 km	16	9
6	Rwanda Mountain Gorilla Rally (8–9 September)	3	(Burundi) Valery Bukera	Subaru Impreza STi N12	2:00:21	14	203.95 km	16	9
7	Gomes Pembe Zambia International Rally (21–22 October)	1	(Kenya) Manvir Singh Baryan	Škoda Fabia R5	2:08:12	10	183.80 km		12
7	Gomes Pembe Zambia International Rally (21–22 October)	2	(Zambia) Muna Singh, Jr.	Subaru Impreza STi R4	2:11:27	10	183.80 km		12
7	Gomes Pembe Zambia International Rally (21–22 October)	3	(Zambia) Muna Singh	Mitsubishi Lancer Evolution IX	2:15:21	10	183.80 km		12

== Championship standings ==
The 2017 African Rally Championship points are as follows:

Pos.	Driver	Vehicle	(Ivory Coast) BAN	(Kenya) SAF	(South Africa) YOR	(Uganda) PoA	(Tanzania) TAN	(Rwanda) RMG	(Zambia) ZAM	Total
1	(Kenya) Manvir Singh Baryan	Škoda Fabia R5		3		1	1	1	1	115
2	(Zambia) Leeroy Gomes	Mitsubishi Lancer Evolution X	Ret	6	2	4	3	4	3	80
3	(Cyprus) Christakis Fitidis	Mitsubishi Lancer Evolution X		12		2	2		4	48
4	(Zambia) Kleevan Gomes	Mitsubishi Lancer Evolution IX		8	4	5	4	Ret	Ret	38

Key
Colour	Result
Gold	Winner
Silver	2nd place
Bronze	3rd place
Green	Points finish
Blue	Non-points finish
Blue	Non-classified finish (NC)
Purple	Did not finish (Ret)
Black	Excluded (EX)
Black	Disqualified (DSQ)
White	Did not start (DNS)
White	Cancelled (C)
Blank	Withdrew entry from the event (WD)
