= Rally of Tanzania =

The Rally of Tanzania is an international rallying event organised by the Automobile Association of Tanzania. The rally is based in the port city of Dar es Salaam and travels south-west to Pugu hills for its competition stages. The event is a round of the African Rally Championship and the Tanzanian National Rally Championship.

The event was first run in 2001 as a largely amateur event and was not held again until 2004 when a considerably more ambitions event was held. The rally became part of the African championship in 2005, becoming the opening round of the season. 2013 saw a calendar reshuffle to mid-season as well as a location shift from Bagamoyo to the Pugu Hills.

Zimbabwean driver James Whyte is the only driver to have scored more than one victory after winning back-to-back in 2009 and 2010.

== List of winners ==
Sourced in part from:

Year	Winner	Car
2001	(Tanzania) Pat Comtoise	Land Rover 110 Series
2002 - 2003	Not held	
2004	(Tanzania) Omar Bakhresa	Subaru Impreza WRX
2005	(Uganda) Riyaz Kurji	Mitsubishi Lancer Evo VI
2006	(Belgium) Patriek Emontspool	Subaru Impreza WRX STi
2007	(Japan) Hideaki Miyoshi	Mitsubishi Lancer Evo IX
2008	(Zambia) Muna Singh	Subaru Impreza WRX STi
2009	(Zimbabwe) James Whyte	Subaru Impreza WRX STi
2010	(Zimbabwe) James Whyte	Subaru Impreza WRX STi
2011	(Madagascar) Jean-Yves Ranarivelo	Subaru Impreza WRX STi
2012	(Zambia) Mohammed Essa	Subaru Impreza WRX STi
2013	(Uganda) Jas Mangat	Mitsubishi Lancer Evo IX
2014	(Kenya) Jaspreet Singh Chatthe	Mitsubishi Lancer Evo X
2015	(Tanzania) Gerard Miller	Mitsubishi Lancer Evo IX
2016	(Zambia) Jassy Singh	Subaru Impreza WRX STi
2017	(Kenya) Manvir Singh Baryan	Škoda Fabia R5
2018	(Kenya) Manvir Singh Baryan	Škoda Fabia R5
2019	(Tanzania) Dharam Pandya	Subaru WRX STI
2020	Not held	
2021	(Kenya) Carl Tundo	Volkswagen Polo GTI R5
2022	(Kenya) Karan Patel	Ford Fiesta R5
2023	(Uganda) Jas Mangat	Hyundai i20 R5
2024	Canecelled	
2025	(Kenya) Karan Patel	Škoda Fabia R5
