= 2007 African Rally Championship =

International rally championship

The 2007 African Rally Championship season (ARC) was an international rally championship organized by the FIA. The champion was Zimbabwean driver Conrad Rautenbach.

== Calendar ==
Date	Event	Winner
February 9-11	Rally of Tanzania	(Japan) Hideaki Miyoshi
march 9-11	KCB Safari Rally Kenya	(Zimbabwe) Conrad Rautenbach
April 13-15	Pearl of Africa Uganda Rally	(Zimbabwe) Conrad Rautenbach
May 4-6	Rwanda Mountain Gorilla Rally	(Zimbabwe) Conrad Rautenbach
May 24-27	Zulu Rally South Africa	(Zimbabwe) Conrad Rautenbach
July 13-15	Dunlop Zimbabwe Challenge Rally	(Zimbabwe) Conrad Rautenbach
August 17-19	Zambia International Rally	(Zambia) Muna Singh

== Points ==
#	Driver	Event							Points
#	Driver	TAN (Tanzania)	SAF (Kenya)	UGA (Uganda)	RWA (Rwanda)	RSA (South Africa)	ZWE (Zimbabwe)	Zam (Zambia)	Points
1.	(Zimbabwe) Conrad Rautenbach	6	16	15	16	16	16	0	85
2.	(Zambia) Muna Singh	0	8	8	12	12	12	16	68
3.	(Japan) Hideaki Miyoshi	16	10	10	8	0	0	0	44
4.	(South Africa) Lola Verlaque	7	0	0	0	0	8	12	27
5.	(Kenya) Asad Anwar	10	5	0	0	0	0	0	15
6.	(Belgium) Patrick Emontspool	5	4	0	5	0	0	0	14
7.	(Tanzania) Issa Mohamed	3	3	0	0	0	0	0	6
8.	(Uganda) Emmanuel Katto	0	2	3	0	0	0	0	5
9.	(Tanzania) Omar Bakressa	1	0	0	0	0	0	0	1
	(Kenya) Anwar Pandya	0	1	0	0	0	0	0	1
