= 2013 African Rally Championship =

33rd season of motorsport event

Seasons
- ← 2012 2014 →

The 2013 African Rally Championship is the 33rd season of the African Rally Championship (ARC). This Championship is the FIA regional rally championship for the African continent. The season began March 1 in Côte d'Ivoire, and ended approximately on November 9 in Madagascar, after eight events.

Ugandan driver Jas Mangat leads the championship by eight points over Zambian driver Mohamed Essa and ten over Zambian driver Jassy Singh. Mangat won the Tanzania Rally, was third in the Zambia International Rally and was the second ARC competitor to finish in the Safari Rally. Essa won the Zambia Rally and was the first ARC driver to finish the Safari Rally. Singh has two second places in the ARC from rallies in South Africa and Tanzania. The points victors of Rallye Bandama Cote d'Ivoire and Rally South Africa have had no other finishes.

== Race calendar and results ==
The 2013 African Rally Championship is as follows:

Round	Rally name	Podium finishers				Statistics			
Round	Rally name	Rank	Driver	Car	Time	Stages	Length	Starters	Finishers
1	(Ivory Coast) Rallye Bandama Cote d'Ivoire (5–6 April)	1	(Ivory Coast) Bakary Fane	Subaru Impreza WRX STI	2:17:27			17	6
1	(Ivory Coast) Rallye Bandama Cote d'Ivoire (5–6 April)	2	(Ivory Coast) Kévin Ligonnet	Mitsubishi Lancer Evo VI	2:17:50			17	6
1	(Ivory Coast) Rallye Bandama Cote d'Ivoire (5–6 April)	3	(Ivory Coast) Eric Pages	Mitsubishi Lancer Evo X	2:21:31			17	6
2	Rally South Africa (18–20 April)	1	(South Africa) Mark Cronje	Ford Fiesta S2000	2:00:46.6			41	33
2	Rally South Africa (18–20 April)	2	(United Kingdom) Matthew Wilson	Ford Fiesta S2000	2:01:55.8			41	33
2	Rally South Africa (18–20 April)	3	(South Africa) Leeroy Poulter	Toyota Yaris S2000	2:03:44.2			41	33
3	Zambia International Rally (17–19 May)	1	(Zambia) Mohamed Essa	Subaru Impreza WRX STI	3:08:35	16	249.86 km	14	7
3	Zambia International Rally (17–19 May)	2	(Rwanda) Giancarlo Davite	Mitsubishi Lancer Evo X	3:15:22	16	249.86 km	14	7
3	Zambia International Rally (17–19 May)	3	(Uganda) Jas Mangat	Subaru Impreza WRX STI	3:19:53	16	249.86 km	14	7
4	Tanzania Rally (14–16 June)	1	(Uganda) Jas Mangat	Mitsubishi Lancer Evo X	2:22:22	15	218.02 km	20	6
4	Tanzania Rally (14–16 June)	2	(Tanzania) Gerard Miller	Mitsubishi Lancer Evo IX	2:25:37	15	218.02 km	20	6
4	Tanzania Rally (14–16 June)	3	(Zambia) Jassy Singh	Subaru Impreza WRX STI	2:28:17	15	218.02 km	20	6
5	Kenya Safari Rally (5–7 July)	1	(Kenya) Baldev Chager	Mitsubishi Lancer Evo IX	2:51:03			74	36
5	Kenya Safari Rally (5–7 July)	2	(Kenya) Azar Anwar	Mitsubishi Lancer Evo VIII	3:01:09			74	36
5	Kenya Safari Rally (5–7 July)	3	(Kenya) Quentin Mitchell	Subaru Impreza WRX STi	3:02:36			74	36
6	Pearl of Africa Uganda Rally (16–18 August)	1	(Uganda) Jas Mangat	Mitsubishi Lancer Evo X	2:02:08	11	229 km	38	18
6	Pearl of Africa Uganda Rally (16–18 August)	2	(Kenya) Frank Tundo	Mitsubishi Lancer Evo IX	2:08:18	11	229 km	38	18
6	Pearl of Africa Uganda Rally (16–18 August)	3	(Uganda) Ponsiano Lwakataka	Subaru Impreza WRX STi	2:16:32	11	229 km	38	18
7	Rwanda Mountain Gorilla Rally (20–22 September)	1	(Rwanda) Giancarlo Davite	Subaru Impreza WRX	3:02:07	15	282.60 km	17	12
7	Rwanda Mountain Gorilla Rally (20–22 September)	2	(Rwanda) Eleftor Mitraros	Mitsubishi Lancer Evo X	3:26:41	15	282.60 km	17	12
7	Rwanda Mountain Gorilla Rally (20–22 September)	3	(Rwanda) Christakis Fitidis	Subaru Impreza WRX	3:28:36	15	282.60 km	17	12
8	International Madagascar Rally (8–9 November)	1	(Madagascar) Olivier Ramiandrisoa	Subaru Impreza WRX STi	2:48:41	12	222.00 km	41	17
8	International Madagascar Rally (8–9 November)	2	(Madagascar) Guillaume Andrianjafy	Mitsubishi Lancer Evo IX	2:54:28	12	222.00 km	41	17
8	International Madagascar Rally (8–9 November)	3	(Madagascar) Guillot Mac	Subaru Impreza WRX STi	3:02:21	12	222.00 km	41	17

== Championship standings ==
The 2013 African Rally Championship points are as follows:

Position	Driver	Vehicle	(Ivory Coast) BAN	(South Africa) RSA	(Zambia) ZAM	(Tanzania) TAN	(Kenya) SAF	(Uganda) PoA	(Rwanda) RMG	(Madagascar) MAD	Total
1	(Zambia) Jassy Singh	Subaru Impreza WRX STI		2	4	2	Ret	2	3	1	106
2	(Uganda) Jas Mangat	Mitsubishi Lancer Evo X			3	1	2	1		Ret	83
3	(Rwanda) Giancarlo Davite	Mitsubishi Lancer Evo X Subaru Impreza WRX STI	Ret	3	2	Ret	Ret	Ret	1		58
4	(Zambia) Mohamed Essa	Subaru Impreza WRX STI		Ret	1	Ret	1				50
5	(Ivory Coast) Eric Pages	Mitsubishi Lancer Evo X	1								25
5	(South Africa) Jan Habig	Ford Fiesta S2000		1							25
7	(Rwanda) Christakis Fitidis	Mitsubishi Lancer Evo X							2		18

Key
Colour	Result
Gold	Winner
Silver	2nd place
Bronze	3rd place
Green	Points finish
Blue	Non-points finish
Blue	Non-classified finish (NC)
Purple	Did not finish (Ret)
Black	Excluded (EX)
Black	Disqualified (DSQ)
White	Did not start (DNS)
White	Cancelled (C)
Blank	Withdrew entry from the event (WD)
