= 2008 African Rally Championship =

International rally championship

The 2008 African Rally Championship season (ARC) was an international rally championship organized by the FIA. The champion was Japan driver Hideaki Miyoshi.

== Calendar ==
Date	Event	Winner
February 8-10	Rally of Tanzania	(Zambia) Muna Singh
April 25-27	Pearl of Africa Uganda Rally	(Zimbabwe) James Whyte
June 27-29	KCB Safari Rally Kenya	(Japan) Hideaki Miyoshi
July 18-20	Zambia International Rally	(Japan) Hideaki Miyoshi
August 22-24	Dunlop Zimbabwe Challenge Rally	(Japan) Hideaki Miyoshi

== Points ==
#	Driver	Points
1.	(Japan) Hideaki Miyoshi	41
2.	(Zimbabwe) James Whyte	31
3.	(Zambia) Muna Singh	24
4.	(South Africa) Jon Williams	16
5.	(Kenya) Peter Horsey	13
6.	(South Africa) Lola Verlaque	12
	(Kenya) Alfir Khan	12
8.	(Kenya) Don Smith	8
10.	(Tanzania) Navraj Hans	6
	(Kenya) Azar Anwar	6
