= 2009 African Rally Championship =

International rally championship

The 2009 African Rally Championship season was the 29th season of the African Rally Championship. The season consisted of five rallies, beginning on February 20, with the Rally of Tanzania, and ending on August 30 with the conclusion of the Zimbabwe Challenge Rally. Zimbabwe's James Whyte won the championship, winning two of the five rallies during the season.

== Calendar ==
Date	Event	Winner
February 20–22	Rally of Tanzania	(Zimbabwe) James Whyte
April 3–5	KCB Safari Rally Kenya	(Zimbabwe) James Whyte
May 1–3	Pearl of Africa Uganda Rally	(Zambia) Muna Singh
July 3–5	Zambia International Rally	(Zambia) Muna Singh
August 28–30	Zimbabwe Challenge Rally	(Zambia) Oliver Costa

== Standings ==
#	Driver	Points
1	(Zimbabwe) James Whyte	38
2	(Zambia) Muna Singh	29
3	(Uganda) Emmanuel Katto	20
4	(Rwanda) Oliver Costa	19.5
5	(Zambia) Mohammed Essa	19.5
6	(Kenya) Don Smith	7
7	(Burundi) Valery Bukera	5
8	(South Africa) Lola Verlaque	5
9	(Kenya) Peter Horsey	2
10	(Uganda) Jas Mangat	1
11	(Kenya) Izhar Mirza	0.5
