= African Rally Championship =

Annual rallying championship series in Africa

- Category: Group Rally2
- Country: Africa
- Inaugural season: 1981
- Drivers' champion: (Kenya) Karan Patel
- Makes' champion: Ford
- Official website: Official site

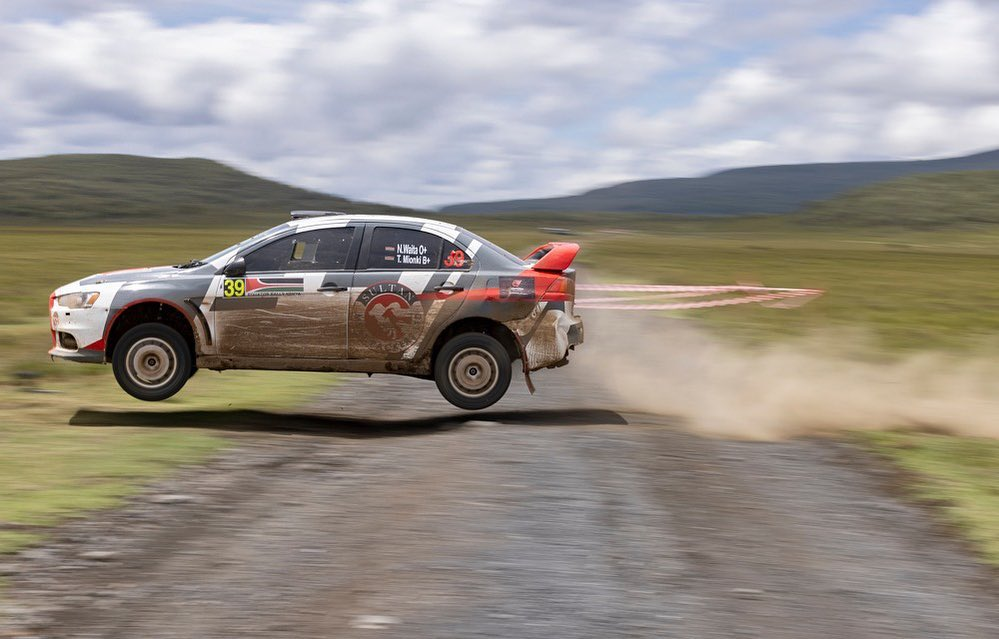
Mitsubishi Lancer Evo X R4 at the 2021 Equator Rally Kenya

The African Rally Championship (ARC) is an international automobile rally championship run under the auspices of the FIA.

== History ==
The championship was first held in 1981 and won by Shekhar Mehta. The most successful driver in the championship's history is Zambian driver Satwant Singh with eight championships. The reigning 2023 champions are Kenyans Karan Patel and Navigator Tauseef Khan.

The championship has been held across the African continent, including the island of Madagascar, although few events are held in or north of the Sahara. The championship has frequently incorporated World Rally Championship events, particularly Africa's two most popular rallies, the Safari Rally in Kenya and the Ivory Coast Rally in the Ivory Coast. It is most popular in former British colonies.

Presently, the African rally championship events are held in Burundi, Zambia, Kenya, Uganda, Tanzania, and Rwanda. The event in the Ivory Coast was left off the 2024 calendar due to very low cross-border entry. This is mostly due to the cost and the vast distances competitors have to travel to attend the event. Logistical challenges are also adding a huge cost to participation.

== Events ==
- Rally of Tanzania
- Pearl of Africa Rally (Uganda)
- Safari Rally (Kenya)
- Zimbabwe Challenge: Not Currently on the Championship Calendar
- Zambia International Motor Rally
- Rwanda Mountain Gorilla Rally
- Equator Rally (Kenya)
- Mountain Gorilla Rally (Rwanda)
- Rallye Côte d'Ivoire
- Rally South Africa - Not Currently on the Championship Calendar
- Tara Rally (Namibia): Not Currently on the Championship Calendar
- Rallye International de Madagascar - Not Currently on the Championship Calendar
- Burundi International Rally: Joining the 2023 FIA African Rally Championship

== Champions ==
Season	Driver	Car
1981	(Kenya) Shekhar Mehta	Nissan
1982	(West Germany) Walter Röhrl	Opel
1983	(Ivory Coast) Alain Ambrosino	Peugeot
1984	(Kenya) David Horsey	Peugeot
1985	(Rwanda) Luc Requile	Opel/Mitsubishi
1986	(Ivory Coast) Alain Ambrosino	Nissan
1987	(Ivory Coast) Alain Ambrosino	Nissan
1988	(Zambia) Satwant Singh	Toyota
1989	(Zambia) Satwant Singh	Volkswagen
1990	(Burundi) Walter Costa	Peugeot
1991	(Zambia) Satwant Singh	Toyota
1992	(Italy) Aldo Riva	Audi
1993	(Zambia) Satwant Singh	Toyota
1994	(Zimbabwe) Abe Smit	Audi
1995	(Namibia) Fritz Flachberger	Ford
1996	(Zambia) Satwant Singh	Subaru
1997	(Zambia) Satwant Singh	Subaru
1998	(Zambia) Satwant Singh	Subaru
1999	(Uganda) Charles Muhangi	Subaru
2000	(Zambia) Satwant Singh	Subaru
2001	(South Africa) Schalk Burger	Subaru
2002	(South Africa) John Gemmel	Subaru
2003	(Spain) Fernando Rueda	Mitsubishi
2004	(Zambia) Muna Singh	Subaru
2005	(Zambia) Muna Singh	Subaru
2006	(Belgium) Patrick Emontspool	Subaru
2007	(Zimbabwe) Conrad Rautenbach	Subaru
2008	(Japan) Hideaki Miyoshi	Mitsubishi
2009	(Zimbabwe) James Whyte	Subaru
2010	(Zimbabwe) James Whyte	Subaru
2011	(Zimbabwe) Conrad Rautenbach	Subaru
2012	(Zambia) Mohamed Essa	Subaru
2013	(Zambia) Jassy Singh	Subaru
2014	(Ivory Coast) Gary Chaynes	Mitsubishi
2015	(Kenya) Jaspreet Singh Chatthe	Mitsubishi
2016	(Kenya) Don Smith	Subaru
2017	(Kenya) Manvir Baryan	Škoda
2018	(Kenya) Manvir Baryan	Škoda
2019	(Kenya) Manvir Baryan	Škoda
2020	Cancelled due to COVID-19 pandemic	
2021	(Kenya) Carl "Flash" Tundo	Volkswagen Polo
2022	(Zambia) Leeroy Gomes	Ford
2023	(Kenya) Karan Patel	Ford
2024	(Kenya) Karan Patel	Škoda
2025	(Uganda) Yasin Nasser	Ford
