= Rally of South Africa =

The York Rally South Africa, is an international rallying event organised by the South African Motorsport Club based in the Mpumalanga Province in South Africa. The event is a round of the African Rally Championship and the South African Rally Championship.

The event was first ran in 1992 as a round of the South African championship with local drivers dominating the event's history. The event turned international in 2011 upon South Africa's re-entry to the African Rally Championship. Multiple South African champion Jan Habig is the most successful driver in the rally's history with six wins over an eight-year period from 1999 to 2006, all in Volkswagen Polos. Enzo Kuun and Serge Damseaux each have four wins.

The rally was known as the Sasol Rally for 25 years, via a sponsorship arrangement with Sasol. In 2017 York Timbers took over sponsorship of the rally.

== List of winners ==
Sourced in part from:

Year	Winner	Car
1992	(South Africa) Sarel van der Merwe	Ford Laser
1993	(South Africa) Sarel van der Merwe	Ford Laser
1994	(South Africa) Enzo Kuun	Ford Laser
1995	(South Africa) Serge Damseaux	Toyota Conquest
1996	(South Africa) Serge Damseaux	Toyota Conquest
1997	(South Africa) Enzo Kuun	Daewoo Cielo
1998	(South Africa) Serge Damseaux	Toyota Conquest
1999	(South Africa) Jan Habig	Volkswagen Polo
2000	(South Africa) Jan Habig	Volkswagen Polo
2001	(South Africa) Jan Habig	Volkswagen Polo
2002	(South Africa) Enzo Kuun	Volkswagen Polo
2003	(South Africa) Jan Habig	Volkswagen Polo
2004	(South Africa) Jan Habig	Volkswagen Polo
2005	(South Africa) Serge Damseaux	Volkswagen Polo
2006	(South Africa) Jan Habig	Volkswagen Polo
2007	(South Africa) Johnny Gemmell	Toyota RunX
2008	(South Africa) Enzo Kuun	Volkswagen Polo
2009	(South Africa) Johnny Gemmell	Toyota Auris
2010	(South Africa) Enzo Kuun	Volkswagen Polo
2011	(South Africa) Leeroy Poulter	Toyota Auris
2012	(South Africa) Mark Cronje	Ford Fiesta S2000
2013	(South Africa) Mark Cronje	Ford Fiesta S2000
2014	(South Africa) Leeroy Poulter	Toyota Yaris S2000
2015	(South Africa) Mark Cronje	Ford Fiesta S2000
2016	(South Africa) Leeroy Poulter	Toyota Yaris S2000
2017	(South Africa) Japie Van Niekerk	Ford Fiesta S2000
2018	(Kenya) Manvir Singh Baryan	Škoda Fabia R5
