= Satwant Singh (rally driver) =

Zambian businessman and entrepreneur

Satwant Singh is a Zambian rally driver, and 8-time winner of the African Rally Championship.

A businessman and entrepreneur, Singh is an established figure of motor sport in Central and Southern Africa.

Born on 3 March 1943 he is the youngest of his siblings. Eldest sister Gurdeep and followed brother Guru Singh.

Family: Lee-Anne Singh nee Piers met Satwant in 1974 in Lusaka through her brother, Adrian Piers, who served for Satwant in 1973 for the East African Safari Rally when he finished seventh, the highest-placed private entry. Their romance was fraught with many battles on several levels cultural, societal, age and family. Despite all odds they did get married have two daughters Prethi and Mandeep, and 2 grandchildren.

Satwant's siblings: Gurdeep has two children Raju and Pappu Saran who also rallied. Guru Singh has three children Rammy, Tinky and Muna Singh all with notable careers in Rallying.

== Past achievements ==
- 8 times FIA African Continent Rally Champion - 1988, 1989, 1991, 1993, 1996, 1997, 1998, 2000
- Awarded the “Order of Distinguished Services” (ODS) by the Head of State (Zambia) for outstanding sporting performance.
- Awarded the “Outstanding Contribution to Sport” by the National Sports Council of Zambia
- Zambian National Rally Champion - 1972, 1975, 1986, 1987, 1988, 1989, 1991, 1992, 1995, 1998
- Rothmans of Pall Mall Sportsman of the Year - 1972, 1987, 1988, 1989, 1993, 1997
- Rothmans of Pall Mall International Sportsman of the Year - 1996
- Orbitsports Man of the Month - April & October 1976

== International attainments ==
East African Safari Rally

1. 1976 13th overall Datsun 180B Dave Haworth - Highest placed private entry, Class winner
2. 1973 7th overall Colt Galant John Mitchell - Outstanding Performance Award
3. 1972 Datsun 1200 - Meritorious Performance Award

Zimbabwe Challenge

1. 1998
2. 1997
3. 1996 3rd overall Subaru Impreza S. Thatthi
4. 1995 2nd overall Hyundai Accent Jim Redmond
5. 1993 2nd overall Toyota Celica Supee Soin
6. 1991 2nd overall Mitsubishi VR4 Mike Doughty
7. 1990 1st overall VW Golf GTi S. Thatthi
8. 1989 2nd overall VW Golf GTi S. Thatthi
9. 1988 1st overall Opel Manta S. Thatthi
10. 1987 1st overall Opel Manta S. Thatthi
11. 1985 1st overall Opel Manta Supee Soin
12. 1984 5th overall Fiat 131 Jim Pilling

Zambia Int Rally

1. 2000 1st overall Subaru Impreza S. Thatthi
2. 1998 1st overall
3. 1997 1st overall Subaru Impreza S.Thatthi
4. 1996 1st overall Hyundai Elantra Jim Redmond
5. 1995 1st overall Hyundai Accent E. Gangat
6. 1994 1st overall VW Golf GTi L.A. Singh
7. 1993 2nd overall Toyota Celica E. Gangat
8. 1992 2nd overall VW Golf GTi M. Verjee
9. 1991 1st overall VW Golf GTi S. Thatthi
10. 1989 1st overall VW Golf GTi S. Thatthi
11. 1988 2nd overall Opel Manta L.A. Singh
12. 1987 2nd overall Opel Manta Thee Soin
13. 1986 1st overall Opel Manta Chris Jennings
14. 1985 1st overall Opel Manta Guy Hall
15. 1975 1st overall Datsun 1600SSS Dave Haworth
16. 1974 1st overall Datsun 1600SSS John Mitchell
17. 1970 2nd overall Datsun 1600SSS John Mitchell
18. 1969 3rd overall Peugeot 404 John Mitchell

Castrol Rally SA

1. 2000
2. 1998
3. 1997 10th overall Subaru Impreza S. Thatthi
4. 1996 12th overall Hyundai Elantra S. Thatthi
5. 1994 3rd overall Toyota Celica Richard Leeke
6. 1993 4th overall Toyota Celica Richard Leeke

PMC Rally SA

1. 1997 12th overall Subaru Impreza S. Thatthi
2. 1996 12th overall Subaru Impreza S. Thatthi

Safari du Zaïre

1. 1991 2nd overall VW Golf GTi S. Voukovich
2. 1987 Best Sportsman Award Opel Manta Guy Hall
3. 1986 Meritorious Award Opel Manta Guy Hall

Rallye du Burundi

1. 1997 1st overall Subaru Impreza S.Thatthi
2. 1993 1st overall Toyota Celica Luc Verhulst
3. 1991 1st overall Mitsubishi VR4 L.Verhulst
4. 1990 1st overall VW Golf GTi Luc Verhulst
5. 1989 1st overall VW Golf GTi Luc Verhulst
6. 1988 1st overall VW Golf GTi Luc Verhulst

Rallye du Rwanda

1. 2000 2nd overall Subaru Imprezza M. Goma
2. 1989 1st overall VW Golf GTi Luc Verhulst
3. 1988 2nd overall VW Golf GTi Luc Verhulst

Total Tara Namibia

1. 2000 2nd overall Subaru Impreza M. Goma
2. 1998
3. 1997 10th overall Subaru Impreza S.Thatthi
4. 1994 4th overall VW Golf GTi K. Pretorious
5. 1991 2nd overall VW Golf GTi S. Thatthi

Equator Rally Kenya

1. 2000 6th overall Subaru Impreza M.Verjee
2. 1998 3rd overall
3. 1997 6th overall Subaru Impreza S. Thatthi
4. 1996 1st overall Subaru Impreza S. Thatthi
5. 1993 3rd overall Toyota Celica S. Thatthi
6. 1991 3rd overall Mitsubishi VR4 S. Thatthi

Tanzania Thousand

1. 1973 2nd overall Datsun 1600SSS John Mitchell
2. 1972 3rd overall Datsun 1600SSS John Mitchell
3. 1971 6th overall Datsun 1200 John Mitchell
4. 1969 2nd overall Peugeot 404 Guru Singh

Pearl of Africa Rally Uganda

1. 2nd overall Subaru Impreza M.Goma

Sporting positions
Preceded by Alain Ambrosino	African Rally Champion; 1988 & 1989	Succeeded by Walter Costa
Preceded by Walter Costa	African Rally Champion; 1991	Succeeded by Aldo Riva
Preceded by Aldo Riva	African Rally Champion; 1993	Succeeded by Abe Smit
Preceded by Fritz Flachberger	African Rally Champion; 1996, 1997 & 1998	Succeeded by Charles Muhangi
Preceded by Charles Muhangi	African Rally Champion; 2000	Succeeded by Schalk Burger
