= Rallye International de Madagascar =

The Rallye International de Madagascar is an international rallying event organised by the Federation du Sport Auto-Moto de Madagascar. The rally, Madagascar's biggest annual motorsport event is based in the Madagascan capital of Antananarivo. The event is a round of the African Rally Championship and the Madagascan National Rally Championship.

The rally, the oldest event still running in African, began in 1951 as the Rally du Sud. It was renamed the Rallye Shell de Madagascar in 1953, then the Grand rallye International de Madagascar in 1970. Political instability which in turn led to the collapse of the Madagascan economy saw the rally suspended after the 1972 event. The Grand Rallye de Madagascar returned briefly from 1986 to 1990 before the collapse of the military government saw another period of suspension.

1997 saw the Rallye International de Madagascar return again only briefly until 2001. 1997 was the first and only time the rally was won by a female driver and a female co-driver, "Mimi" and "Yoyo" in a Peugeot 106 Kit Car. Another rally was held in 2003 before it returned in 2010 as a candidate rally for the African Rally Championship. Its success saw the event graduate to ARC status for 2010.

The French influence over the event is strong. French colonial rule of Madagascar ended in 1960 but the first local driver to win the event was not until 1966. French cars likewise have dominated the event with Citroën, Peugeots and Renaults dominating the results, still providing winning cars right up until 1999 despite the influence of the Japanese manufacturers on the sport globally. One of the odd traditions of Madagascar rallying is competitors are commonly referred to by nicknames and pseudonyms rather than their actual names. "Joda", otherwise known as Jean-Yves Ranarivelo is the most successful driver in the rallies history with five victories spread between 1990 and the first African championship event in 2011.

== List of winners ==
Sourced in part from:

| Year | Winner | Car |
Rallye du Sud
| 1951 | (France) Chantrel | Peugeot 203 |
| 1952 | (France) Chantrel | Peugeot 203 |
Rallye Shell de Madagascar
| 1953 | (France) Bigeon | Land Rover |
| 1954 | (France) de Villeneuve | Jeep |
| 1955 | (France) Castere | Citroën 2CV |
| 1956 | (France) Chantrel | Peugeot 403 |
| 1957 | Not held | |
| 1958 | (France) Patry | Citroën ID19 |
| 1959 | (France) Chantrel | Peugeot 403 |
| 1960 | (France) de Lagiroday | Porsche |
| 1961 | Not held | |
| 1962 | (France) Duclos | Renault Dauphine |
| 1963 | (France) Duclos | Citroën DS19 |
| 1964 | (France) Obeniche | Saab 96 |
| 1965 | (France) Duclos | Austin Cooper S |
| 1966 | (Madagascar) Ramaroson | Austin Cooper S |
| 1967 | (Madagascar) Mahaison | Peugeot 404 |
| 1968 | (Madagascar) Andriantsoa | Renault 16 TS |
| 1969 | (France) Noudeu | Fiat 125S |
Grand Rallye International de Madagascar
| 1970 | (Madagascar) Nivelle | Citroën DS21 |
| 1971 | (Madagascar) Ramanantsoa | Peugeot 504 |
| 1972 - 1985 | Not held | |
Grand Rallye de Madagascar
| 1986 | (Madagascar) "Rafala" | Peugeot 504 |
| 1987 | (Madagascar) "Dofa" | Renault 18 TS |
| 1988 | (Madagascar) "Bebe" | Peugeot 504 |
| 1989 | (Madagascar) Frères Rakotondrabesa | Peugeot 504 |
| 1990 | (Madagascar) Jean-Yves "Joda" Ranarivelo | Opel Ascona |
| 1991 - 1996 | Not held | |
Rallye International de Madagascar
| 1997 | (Madagascar) "Mimi" | Peugeot 106 Kit Car |
| 1998 | (Madagascar) Faly "Roses" Andrianafetra | Peugeot 106 Kit Car |
| 1999 | (Madagascar) Jean-Yves "Joda" Ranarivelo | Renault Clio |
| 2000 | (Madagascar) "Razakaboana" | Nissan Pulsar GTI-R |
| 2001 | (Madagascar) Jean-Yves "Joda" Ranarivelo | Subaru Impreza WRX |
| 2002 | Not held | |
| 2003 | (Madagascar) Mamy Hubert "Mamy Kely" Rajoelison | Toyota Celica GT-Four |
| 2004 - 2009 | Not held | |
| 2010 | (Madagascar) Jean-Yves "Joda" Ranarivelo | Subaru Impreza WRX STi |
| 2011 | (Madagascar) Jean-Yves "Joda" Ranarivelo | Subaru Impreza WRX STi |
| 2012 | (Madagascar) Mamy Patrick "Boom" Solofonirina | Mitsubishi Lancer Evo X |
| 2013 | (Madagascar) Olivier Ramiandrisoa | Subaru Impreza WRX STi |
| 2014 | (Madagascar) Mamy Patrick "Boom" Solofonirina | Mitsubishi Lancer Evo X |
| 2015 | (Madagascar) Mamy Patrick "Boom" Solofonirina | Mitsubishi Lancer Evo X |
| 2016 | (Madagascar) Tahina Razafinjoelina | Subaru Impreza STi N10 |
| 2017 | (Madagascar) Lahatra Aina "Sefo Kely" Rajaonalisoa | Subaru Impreza |
| 2018 | (Madagascar) Tahina Razafinjoelina | Subaru Impreza STi R4 |
| 2019 | (Madagascar) Rivo Aina Randrianarivony | Subaru Impreza STi R4 |
| 2020 | (Madagascar) Rivo Aina Randrianarivony | Subaru Impreza STi R4 |
| 2021 | (Madagascar) Frederic Rabekoto | Subaru Impreza STi R4 |
| 2022 | (Madagascar) Frederic Rabekoto | Subaru Impreza STi R4 |
Grand Rallye de Madagascar
| 2023 | (Madagascar) Faniry Rasoamaromaka | Peugeot 208 T16 |

Note: Nicknames, instead of full names, are used in official results in Malagasy rallying. For rallies from 2001 to today, nicknames are not listed in this table if they are the same as the driver's first name.
