= 2015 African Rally Championship =

35th season of motorsport event

The 2015 African Rally Championship was the 35th season of the African Rally Championship (ARC), the FIA regional zone rally championship for the African continent. The season began March 6 in the Côte d'Ivoire, and ended on November 8 in Madagascar, after seven events.

Jaspreet Singh Chatthe became the first Kenyan driver since David Horsey in 1984 to win the African championship when he won the Pearl of Africa Rally, securing the championship a round early. Singh Chatthe won three of the seven events – as well as a fourth class win at the Sasol Rally; the event being won overall by Mark Cronje – and won the championship by forty-six points of Jassy Singh from Zambia. Third place in the drivers' championship went to Ugandan driver Abdul Ssempebwa, a further twenty-one points in arrears. Aside from Singh Chatthe's victories, Gary Chaynes won the event in the Côte d'Ivoire and Mamy Patrick Solofonirina won in Madagascar, while no ARC-eligible competitors finished in Tanzania – the event was won by Gerard Miller.

== Event calendar and results ==
The 2015 African Rally Championship was as follows:

Round	Rally name	Podium finishers				Statistics			
Round	Rally name	Rank	Driver	Car	Time	Stages	Length	Starters	Finishers
1	(Ivory Coast) Rallye Bandama Côte d'Ivoire (6–8 March)	1	(Ivory Coast) Gary Chaynes	Mitsubishi Lancer Evolution IX	1:57:28.9	12	205.78 km	23	14
1	(Ivory Coast) Rallye Bandama Côte d'Ivoire (6–8 March)	2	(France) Marc Molinié	Mitsubishi Lancer Evolution VII	2:02:30.2	12	205.78 km	23	14
1	(Ivory Coast) Rallye Bandama Côte d'Ivoire (6–8 March)	3	(Lebanon) Ali Jaber	Mitsubishi Lancer Evolution IX	2:07:04.4	12	205.78 km	23	14
2	(South Africa) Sasol Rally (17–18 April)	1	(South Africa) Mark Cronje	Ford Fiesta S2000	2:26:12.2	15	204.88 km	26	21
2	(South Africa) Sasol Rally (17–18 April)	2	(South Africa) Leeroy Poulter	Toyota Yaris S2000	2:29:56.0	15	204.88 km	26	21
2	(South Africa) Sasol Rally (17–18 April)	3	(South Africa) Gugulethu Zulu	Volkswagen Polo S2000	2:33:02.0	15	204.88 km	26	21
3	Zambia International Rally (15–17 May)	1	(Kenya) Jaspreet Singh Chatthe	Mitsubishi Lancer Evolution X	2:40:13	16	233.11 km	25	14
3	Zambia International Rally (15–17 May)	2	(Zambia) Jassy Singh	Subaru Impreza WRX STi	2:43:27	16	233.11 km	25	14
3	Zambia International Rally (15–17 May)	3	(Zambia) Mohammed Essa	Subaru Impreza WRX STi	2:43:46	16	233.11 km	25	14
4	Rally of Tanzania (12–14 June)	1	(Tanzania) Gerard Miller	Mitsubishi Lancer Evolution IX	2:32:41	16	238.39 km	31	17
4	Rally of Tanzania (12–14 June)	2	(Tanzania) Jamil Khan	Subaru Impreza	2:33:45	16	238.39 km	31	17
4	Rally of Tanzania (12–14 June)	3	(Uganda) Duncan Mubiru	Subaru Impreza WRX STi	2:40:46	16	238.39 km	31	17
5	Rwanda Mountain Gorilla Rally (31 July–2 August)	1	(Kenya) Jaspreet Singh Chatthe	Mitsubishi Lancer Evolution X	1:52:19	12	211.00 km	20	11
5	Rwanda Mountain Gorilla Rally (31 July–2 August)	2	(Zambia) Jassy Singh	Subaru Impreza WRX STi	1:52:42	12	211.00 km	20	11
5	Rwanda Mountain Gorilla Rally (31 July–2 August)	3	(Burundi) Valery Bukera	Subaru Impreza WRX STi	2:03:15	12	211.00 km	20	11
6	Pearl of Africa Uganda Rally (28–30 August)	1	(Kenya) Jaspreet Singh Chatthe	Mitsubishi Lancer Evolution X	2:35:55	12	214.67 km	36	17
6	Pearl of Africa Uganda Rally (28–30 August)	2	(Uganda) Andrew Kananura	Subaru Impreza WRX STi	2:47:37	12	214.67 km	36	17
6	Pearl of Africa Uganda Rally (28–30 August)	3	(Uganda) Duncan Mubiru	Subaru Impreza WRX STi	2:49:57	12	214.67 km	36	17
7	Rallye International de Madagascar (6–8 November)	1	(Madagascar) Mamy Patrick Solofonirina	Mitsubishi Lancer Evolution X	2:39:45	9	196.65 km	39	10
7	Rallye International de Madagascar (6–8 November)	2	(Madagascar) Tinahenintsoa Rakotomiarana	Subaru Impreza WRX	2:59:10	9	196.65 km	39	10
7	Rallye International de Madagascar (6–8 November)	3	(Madagascar) Hariandry Razakaboana	Subaru Impreza WRX STi	3:10:46	9	196.65 km	39	10

== Championship standings ==
The 2015 African Rally Championship points are as follows:

Pos.	Driver	Vehicle	(Ivory Coast) BAN	(South Africa) RSA	(Zambia) ZAM	(Tanzania) TAN	(Rwanda) RMG	(Uganda) PoA	(Madagascar) MAD	Total
1	(Kenya) Jaspreet Singh Chatthe	Mitsubishi Lancer Evolution X		1	1	Ret	1	1		100
2	(Zambia) Jassy Singh	Subaru Impreza WRX STi		2	2	Ret	2	Ret		54
3	(Uganda) Abdul Ssempebwa	Subaru Impreza WRX STi					3	2		33
4	(Zambia) Muna Singh, Jr.	Subaru Impreza WRX STi		3	3	Ret				30
5	(Ivory Coast) Gary Chaynes	Mitsubishi Lancer Evolution IX	1							25
5	(Madagascar) Mamy Patrick Solofonirina	Mitsubishi Lancer Evolution X							1	25

Key
Colour	Result
Gold	Winner
Silver	2nd place
Bronze	3rd place
Green	Points finish
Blue	Non-points finish
Blue	Non-classified finish (NC)
Purple	Did not finish (Ret)
Black	Excluded (EX)
Black	Disqualified (DSQ)
White	Did not start (DNS)
White	Cancelled (C)
Blank	Withdrew entry from the event (WD)
