= Alain Ambrosino =

French rally driver (born 1951)

Personal information
- Nationality: (France) French
- Born: 15 June 1951 (age 75); Casablanca, Morocco

World Rally Championship record
- Years active: 1974 – 1990
- Co-driver: (Ivory Coast) Jean-Jacques Regnier (Ivory Coast) Jean-Robert Bureau (France) Robert Schneck (France) Jean-François Fauchille (France) Daniel Le Saux
- Rallies: 18
- Championships: 0
- Rally wins: 1
- Podiums: 3
- Stage wins: 2
- Total points: 103
- First rally: 1974 Press-on-Regardless Rally
- First win: 1988 Rallye Côte d'Ivoire

Alain Ambrosino (born 15 June 1951 in Casablanca, Morocco) is a French rally driver, who won the Rallye Côte d'Ivoire in 1988, a round of the World Rally Championship.

== Career ==
Ambrosino did most of his rallying on the African continent, winning the African Rally Championship three times, in 1983, 1986 and 1987. However, the first World Rally Championship event he contested was the Press-on-Regardless Rally in the United States in 1974, from which he retired. He finished the following year's Rallye du Maroc in 11th position.

It was on the Rallye Côte d'Ivoire where he enjoyed the most success on the world stage. He finished third in 1980 and again in 1985 before winning it in 1988. This result was made possible due to the lack of manufacturer entries in the event.

== WRC victories ==
| # | Event | Season | Co-driver | Car |
|---|---|---|---|---|
| 1 | (Ivory Coast) 20ème Marlboro Rallye Côte d'Ivoire | 1988 | Daniel Le Saux | Nissan 200SX |

Sporting positions
| Preceded by Walter Röhrl | African Rally Champion; 1983 | Succeeded by David Horsey |
| Preceded by Luc Requile | African Rally Champion; 1986 & 1987 | Succeeded by Satwant Singh |
