= Jannie Habig =

South African rally driver

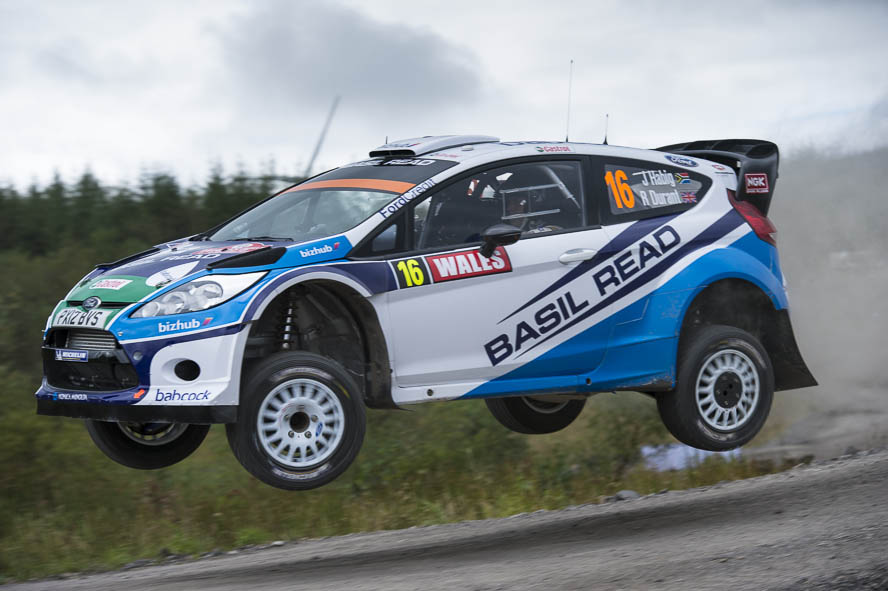
- Jannie Habig at Rally GB in 2012

Personal information
- Nationality: (South Africa) South African

World Rally Championship record
- Years active: 1994, 1996, 1998, 2012
- Co-driver: (South Africa) Douglas Judd (United Kingdom) Robbie Durant
- Teams: M-Sport Ford WRT
- Rallies: 4
- Championships: 0
- Rally wins: 0
- Podiums: 0
- Stage wins: 0
- Total points: 3
- First rally: 1994 RAC Rally
- Last rally: 2012 Rally GB

Jannie "Jan" Habig is a South African rally driver and six-time champion in the South African National Rally Championship. He competed in the 2012 WRC season at Rally GB, having scored points there in 1994, as well as being ranked the first of the ARC-registered drivers in Rally South Africa 2013. He is South Africa's third most successful rally driver.

Habig's co-driver is now Richard Paisley since 2011. Before then, it was Douglas Judd who navigated him to six South African titles.

Sporting positions
Preceded by Serge Damseaux	SA Rally Champion; 1997	Succeeded by Serge Damseaux
Preceded by Serge Damseaux	SA Rally Champion; 1999	Succeeded by Serge Damseaux
Preceded by Serge Damseaux	SA Rally Champion; 2001-2002	Succeeded by Serge Damseaux
Preceded by Serge Damseaux	SA Rally Champion; 2005	Succeeded by Enzo Kuun
Preceded by Enzo Kuun	SA Rally Champion; 2007	Succeeded by Hergen Fekken
