= Zambia International Motor Rally =

The Zambia International Motor Rally, also known as Safari Zambia and Zambia Rally, is an international rallying event organised by the Zambia Motorsports Association. The rally is based in the Zambian capital of Lusaka and travels north of the capital to Chisamba for its competition stages. The event is a round of the African Rally Championship and the Zambian Rally Championship.

The event, one of the oldest in Africa, was first founded in 1969 by the Lusaka Motor Club with John Ireland as Clerk of the Course, who was then ZMSA Competition Secretary, it gained a reputation for being tough and for its formative years was some 2000 miles in length. Apart from a break from 1977 to 1984 during an economic crisis the event has been held continuously. The event is one of the veteran rallies of the African Rally Championship.

Zambian motorsport legend Satwant Singh has dominated the event, winning 14 times, his first in 1972, his most recent in 2002. This included a five-year consecutive streak in the 1990s. Foreign drivers have taken several victories, the first in 1987 to Zimbabwean driver Bill Rautenbach. His son Conrad is the most recent in 2011. While Super 2000 cars have moved in on several FIA zone events in recent years they only have a single victory, Conrad Rautenbach's second win in 2011 as Group N Subarus and Mitsubishis continue to hold sway over the results.

== List of winners ==
Sourced in part from:

Year	Winner	Car
1969	(Zambia) Mike Bond	Datsun 1600
1970	(Zambia) Mike Bond	Datsun 1600
1971	(Zambia) Peter Alexander	Datsun 1600
1972	(Zambia) Satwant Singh	Datsun 1600
1973	(Zambia) Guru Singh	Datsun 710
1974	(Zambia) Satwant Singh	Datsun 1600
1975	(Zambia) Satwant Singh	Datsun 1600
1976	(Zambia) Guru Singh	Fiat 131
1977 - 1984	Not held	
1985	(Zambia) Satwant Singh	Opel Manta 400
1986	(Zambia) Satwant Singh	Opel Manta 400
1987	(Zimbabwe) Bill Rautenbach	Audi Quattro
1988	(Kenya) Manjit Sandhu	Volkswagen Golf GTi
1989	(Zambia) Satwant Singh	Volkswagen Golf GTi
1990	(Burundi) Walter Costa	Peugeot 205 GTi
1991	(Zambia) Satwant Singh	Volkswagen Golf GTi
1992	(Italy) Aldo Riva	Audi 90 Quattro
1993	(Italy) Aldo Riva	Audi Coupé S2
1994	(Zambia) Satwant Singh	Volkswagen Golf GTi
1995	(Zambia) Satwant Singh	Hyundai Accent WRC
1996	(Zambia) Satwant Singh	Hyundai Accent WRC
1997	(Zambia) Satwant Singh	Subaru Impreza WRX
1998	(Zambia) Satwant Singh	Subaru Impreza WRX
1999	(Zimbabwe) Hannes Cruger	Toyota Conquest
2000	(Zambia) Satwant Singh	Subaru Impreza WRX
2001	(Zambia) Muna Singh	Subaru Impreza WRX
2002	(Zambia) Satwant Singh	Subaru Impreza WRX
2003	(South Africa) Fernando Rueda	Mitsubishi Lancer Evo VI
2004	(Zimbabwe) Jess Watson	Mitsubishi Lancer Evo VI
2005	(Zimbabwe) Jess Watson	Mitsubishi Lancer Evo VI
2006	(Zimbabwe) Conrad Rautenbach	Subaru Impreza WRX
2007	(Zambia) Muna Singh	Subaru Impreza WRX
2008	(Japan) Hideaki Miyoshi	Mitsubishi Lancer Evo IX
2009	(Zambia) Muna Singh	Subaru Impreza WRX STi
2010	(Zambia) Muna Singh	Subaru Impreza WRX STi
2011	(Zimbabwe) Conrad Rautenbach	Ford Fiesta S2000
2012	(Zambia) Mohammed Essa	Subaru Impreza WRX STi
2013	(Zambia) Mohammed Essa	Subaru Impreza WRX STi
2014	(Zambia) Mohammed Essa	Subaru Impreza WRX STi
2015	(Kenya) Jaspreet Singh Chatthe	Mitsubishi Lancer Evo X
