= Toyota Etios =

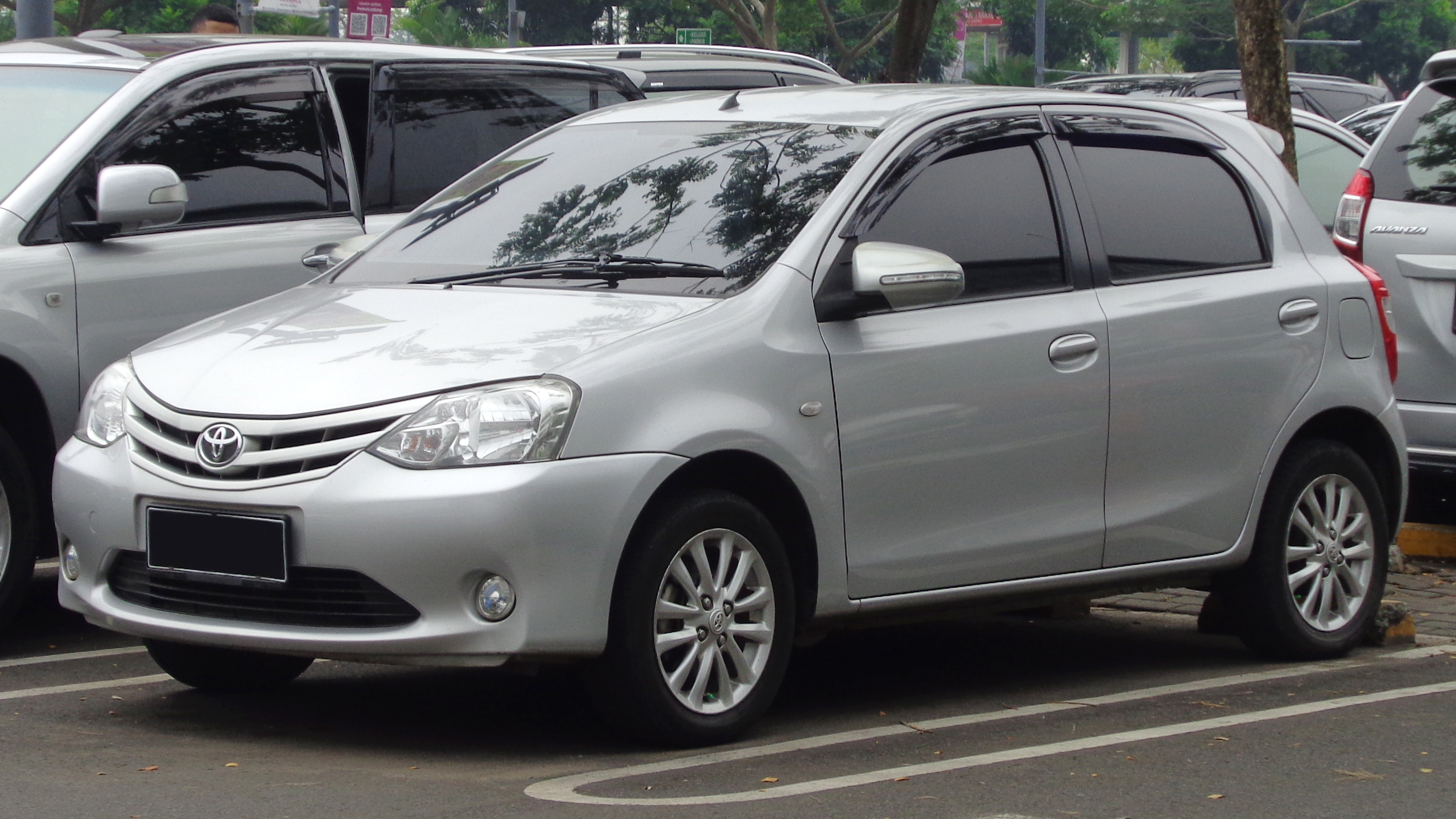
- 2013 Toyota Etios Valco 1.2 E (NGK10; pre-facelift, Indonesia)

Overview
- Manufacturer: Toyota
- Model code: AK10
- Production: November 2010 – April 2020 (saloon, India); June 2011 – April 2020 (hatchback, India); March 2013 – October 2017 (Indonesia); September 2012 – August 2023 (Brazil)
- Assembly: India: Bidadi, Karnataka (TKM); Brazil: Sorocaba, São Paulo; Indonesia: Karawang, West Java (TMMIN — Plant 2)
- Designer: Masayuki Yamaji, Koichi Suga and Kenji Kido

Body and chassis
- Class: Subcompact car
- Body style: 4-door saloon/sedan; 5-door hatchback
- Layout: Front-engine, front-wheel-drive
- Platform: Toyota EFC platform

Powertrain
- Engine: Petrol: 1197 cc 3NR-FE I4 (NGK10); 1329 cc 1NR-FBE I4 (NGK11); 1496 cc 2NR-FE I4 (NGK12/15); 1496 cc 2NR-FBE I4 (NGK12/15); Diesel: 1364 cc 1ND-TV turbodiesel I4 (NUK10/15, India)
- Power output: 59 kW (79 hp; 80 PS) (3NR-FE); 65 kW (87 hp; 88 PS) (1NR-FBE); 66–75 kW (89–101 hp; 90–102 PS) (2NR-FE/2NR-FBE); 50 kW (67 hp; 68 PS) (1ND-TV)
- Transmission: 5-speed manual; 6-speed manual; 4-speed automatic (South America)

Dimensions
- Wheelbase: 2,550 mm (100.4 in) (saloon); 2,460 mm (96.9 in) (hatchback)
- Length: 4,265–4,370 mm (167.9–172.0 in) (saloon); 3,775–3,885 mm (148.6–153.0 in) (hatchback)
- Width: 1,695 mm (66.7 in)
- Height: 1,510 mm (59.4 in)

Chronology
- Successor: Toyota Yaris saloon (XP150) (saloon, India); Toyota Agya GR Sport (A350) (Indonesia); Toyota Glanza/Starlet (Liva/hatchback, India/Africa)

The Toyota Etios is a subcompact car consisting a line of four-door saloon/sedan and five-door hatchback produced by the Japanese automaker Toyota from 2010 to 2023. The saloon version was launched in December 2010 and the hatchback version (with additional "Liva" and "Valco" suffixes in India and Indonesia respectively) followed in June 2011. The vehicle is built on the EFC platform.

The Etios has been produced in India (between 2010 and 2020), Brazil (since 2012, export only since 2021) and Indonesia (between 2013 and 2017). It has also been exported to other countries such as South Africa and several markets in the Americas.

The name Etios was derived from Greek word ethos (ἦθος), meaning 'spirit', 'character' and 'ideals'. The Liva suffix was derived from the development concept phrase "live your life", while Valco was coined from terms value and comfort.

== Overview ==
The Etios Concept saloon with 1.5-litre petrol engine and Etios Concept hatchback with 1.2-litre petrol engine were unveiled in 10th Auto Expo automobile show in New Delhi.

During the development phase, the Etios was codenamed "EFC" (Entry Family Car). Originally, the Etios was planned to be built on the Yaris platform, however a low-cost platform derived from the NBC platform called the EFC platform was used instead. Aimed as the rival to the Dacia/Renault Logan, the vehicle was centered around India and Brazil as the manufacturing base. Toyota invested $350 million building a second plant in India to produce the Etios, with an initial annual production capacity of around 100,000 vehicles. The actual commercial production started in December 2010. In May 2012, the Etios series reached total sales of 100,000 units in India. By 2013, the Indian version was localised to more than 90% of its parts.

As of 2022, the Etios sedan has the largest boot in its segment in Argentina (562 litres). It is bigger than the one in the Toyota Corolla (470 litres).

Since its introduction, the Etios has been updated three times, in March 2013, November 2014 and September 2016. No changes to the overall design were made, but there were changes to the interiors, front fascia and taillamps.

Indian production stopped in March 2020 there as the Bharat Stage 6 went into effect in April. Since Toyota had no interest to upgrade the Etios to meet the updated emissions standards, it was replaced by the more upmarket XP150 series Yaris saloon and the Suzuki Baleno-based Glanza hatchback as Toyota's subcompact car offering in the country. The Etios was also discontinued in Brazil in April 2021 with 620,000 units made in Brazil up to March 2021. The production continues for export markets until mid-2023. The XP150 series Yaris would assume the role of Toyota's entry-level car in the region.

== Etios Cross ==
The Etios Cross is a crossover-inspired version based on the Liva. It was launched in 2014.

== Engines ==
For the Indian market, the petrol engines and transmissions were made locally at Toyota Kirloskar Auto Parts (TKAP), Bidadi, Karnataka, India.

=== Petrol (India) ===
| Model | Engine | Power | Torque | 0–100 km/h (0–62 mph) | Top speed | Transmission | Fuel consumption | Octane rating [(R+M)/2] |
|---|---|---|---|---|---|---|---|---|
| 1.2 L 3NR-FE | 1,197 cc (73.0 cu in) I4 DOHC 16V | 59 kW (79 hp; 80 PS) @ 5,600 rpm | 104 N⋅m (77 lb⋅ft) @ 3,100 rpm | 14.1 s | 174 km/h (108 mph) | 5-speed manual | 17.7 km/L (50 mpg_{‑imp}; 42 mpg_{‑US}) | 91 or higher |
| 1.5 L 2NR-FE | 1,496 cc (91.3 cu in) I4 DOHC 16V | 66 kW (89 hp; 90 PS) @ 5,600 rpm | 132 N⋅m (97 lb⋅ft) @ 3,000 rpm | 10.6 s | 187 km/h (116 mph) | 5-speed manual | 16.7 km/L (47 mpg_{‑imp}; 39 mpg_{‑US}) | 87 or higher |

=== Diesel (India) ===
| Model | Engine | Power | Torque | 0–100 km/h (0–62 mph) | Top speed | Transmission | Fuel consumption | Cetane number |
|---|---|---|---|---|---|---|---|---|
| 1.4 L 1ND-TV | 1,364 cc (83.2 cu in) I4 SOHC 8V | 50 kW (67 hp; 68 PS) @ 3,800 rpm | 170 N⋅m (125 lb⋅ft) @ 1,800 – 2,400 rpm | 13.9 s | 166 km/h (103 mph) | 5-speed manual | 23.6 km/L (67 mpg_{‑imp}; 56 mpg_{‑US}) | 50 or higher |

=== Flex-fuel ===
The saloon and hatchback models sold in Brazil are built with a flexible-fuel engine optimised to run with ethanol blends from E20/E25 to neat hydrous ethanol (E100).

== Safety ==
The Indian-market Etios and Etios Liva come with an immobiliser and door ajar warning as standard across all trims with dual SRS airbags, ABS and EBD available only on the G+, V and VX trims. Without ABS, it had earned a 4-star adult occupant and 3-star child occupant safety rating from Global NCAP 1.0 (similar to Latin NCAP 2013) in 2016.

Global NCAP 1.0 test results (India) Toyota Etios (*) – 2 Airbags (2016, similar to Latin NCAP 2013)
| Test | Score | Stars |
|---|---|---|
| Adult occupant protection | 13.00/17.00 | 4 /5 stars |
| Child occupant protection | 20.02/49.00 | 2 /5 stars |

The Brazilian Etios in its most basic Latin American market configuration with 2 airbags had earned a 4-star adult occupant and 2-star child occupant safety rating from Latin NCAP 1.0 in 2012.

Latin NCAP 1.0 test results Toyota Etios + 2 Airbags (2012, based on Euro NCAP 1997)
| Test | Points | Stars |
|---|---|---|
| Adult occupant: | 12.87/17.0 | 4 /5 stars |
| Child occupant: | 17.38/49.00 | 2 /5 stars |

In 2019, both parameters earned 4-star Latin NCAP 2.0 safety rating for the newer version in its most basic Latin American market configuration with 2 airbags.

Latin NCAP 2.0 test results Toyota Etios + 2 Airbags (2019, based on Euro NCAP 2008)
| Test | Points | Stars |
|---|---|---|
| Adult occupant: | 25.42/34.0 | 4 /5 stars |
| Child occupant: | 40.00/49.00 | 4 /5 stars |

== Gallery ==
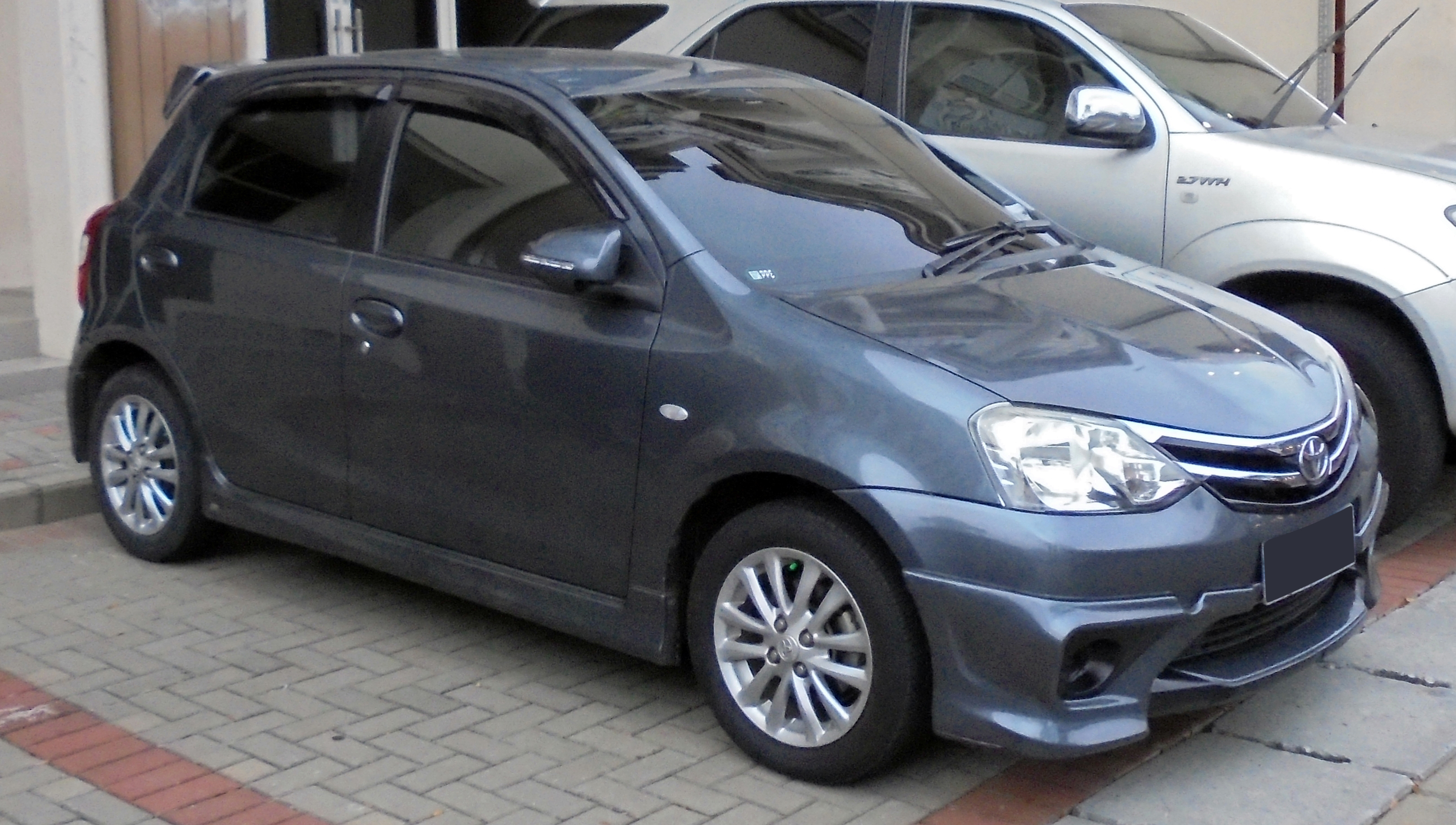
2015 Etios Valco 1.2 TOM'S (NGK10; pre-facelift, Indonesia)

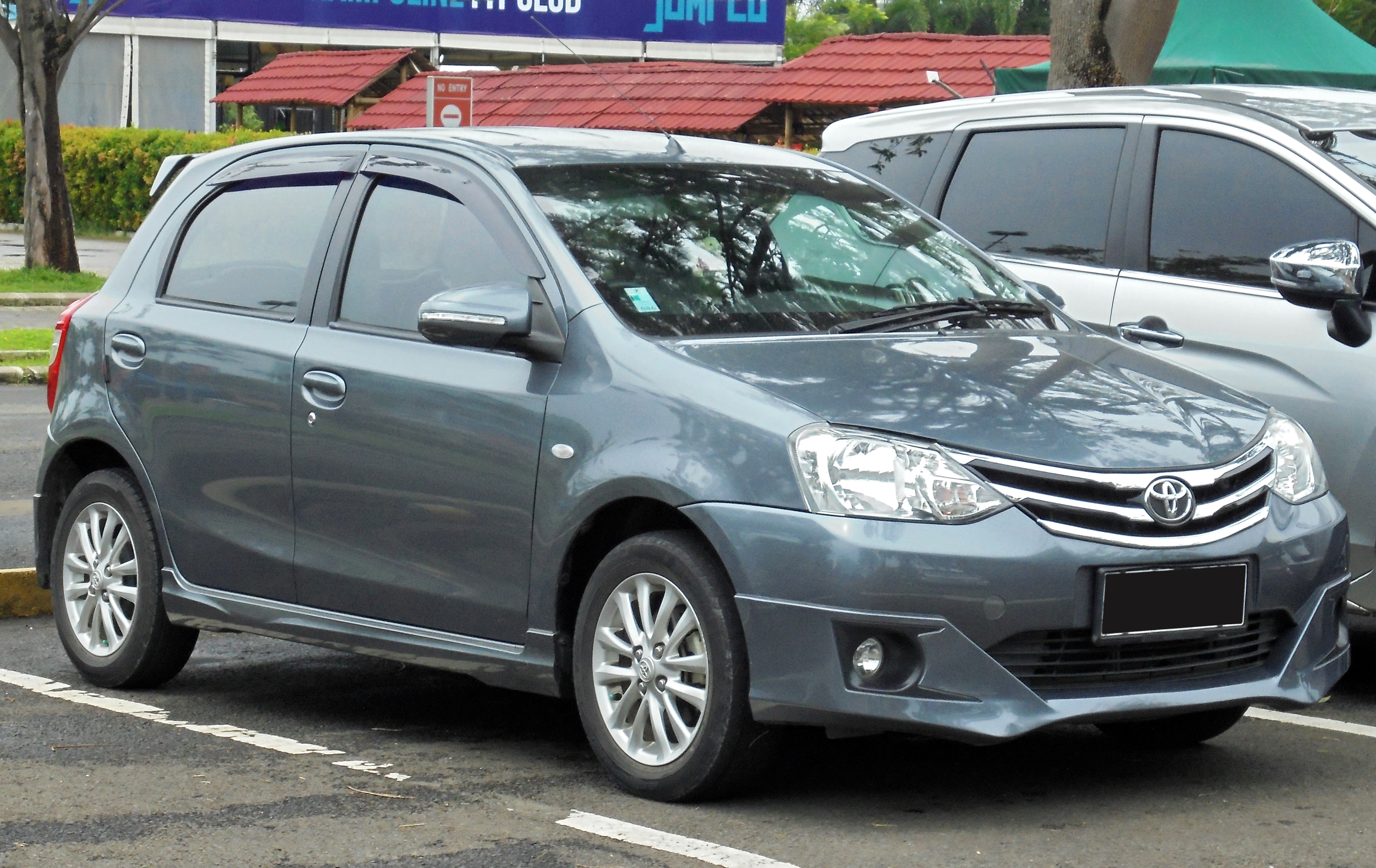
2014 Etios Valco 1.2 G (NGK10; pre-facelift, Indonesia)

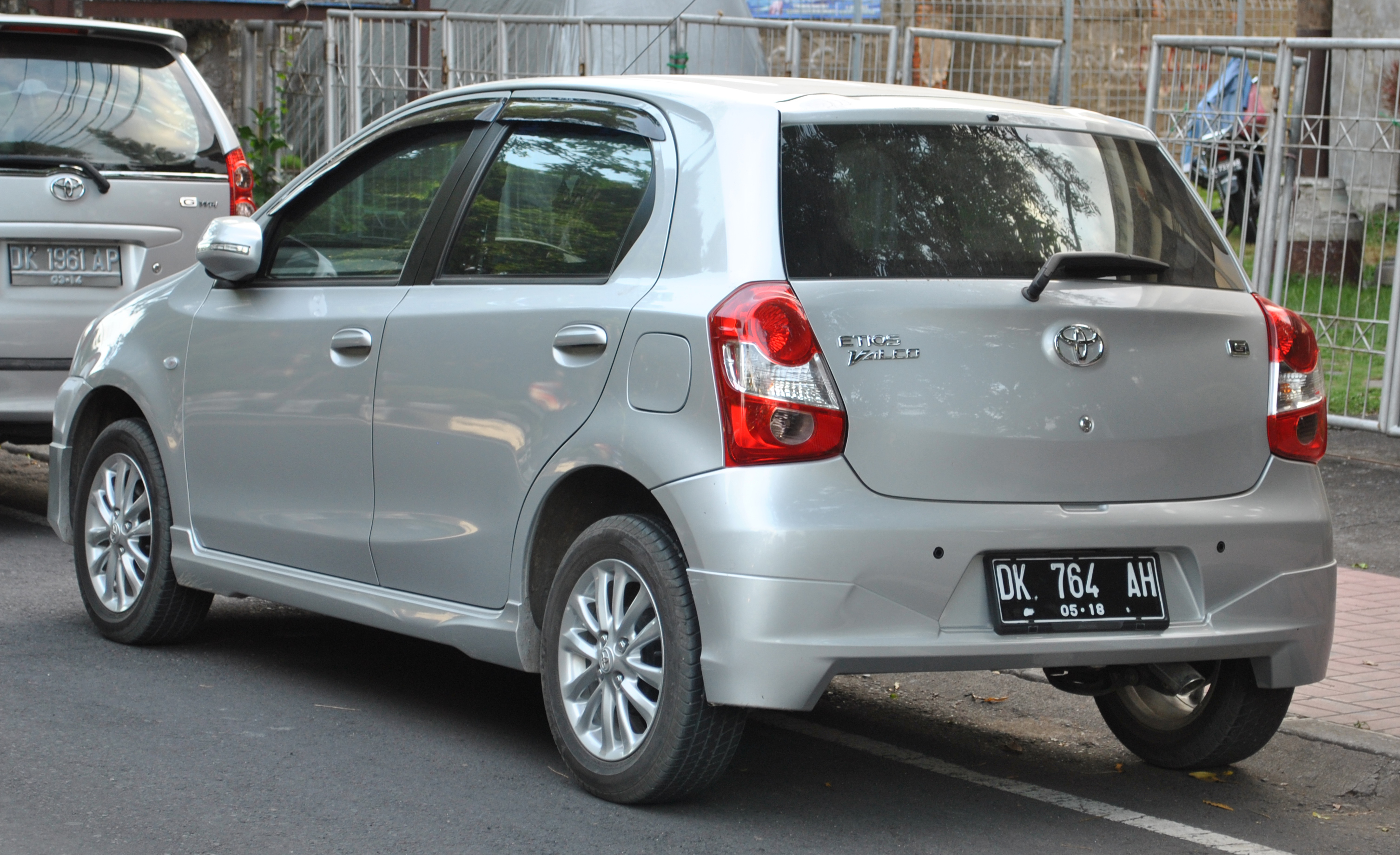
2013 Etios Valco 1.2 G (NGK10; pre-facelift, Indonesia)

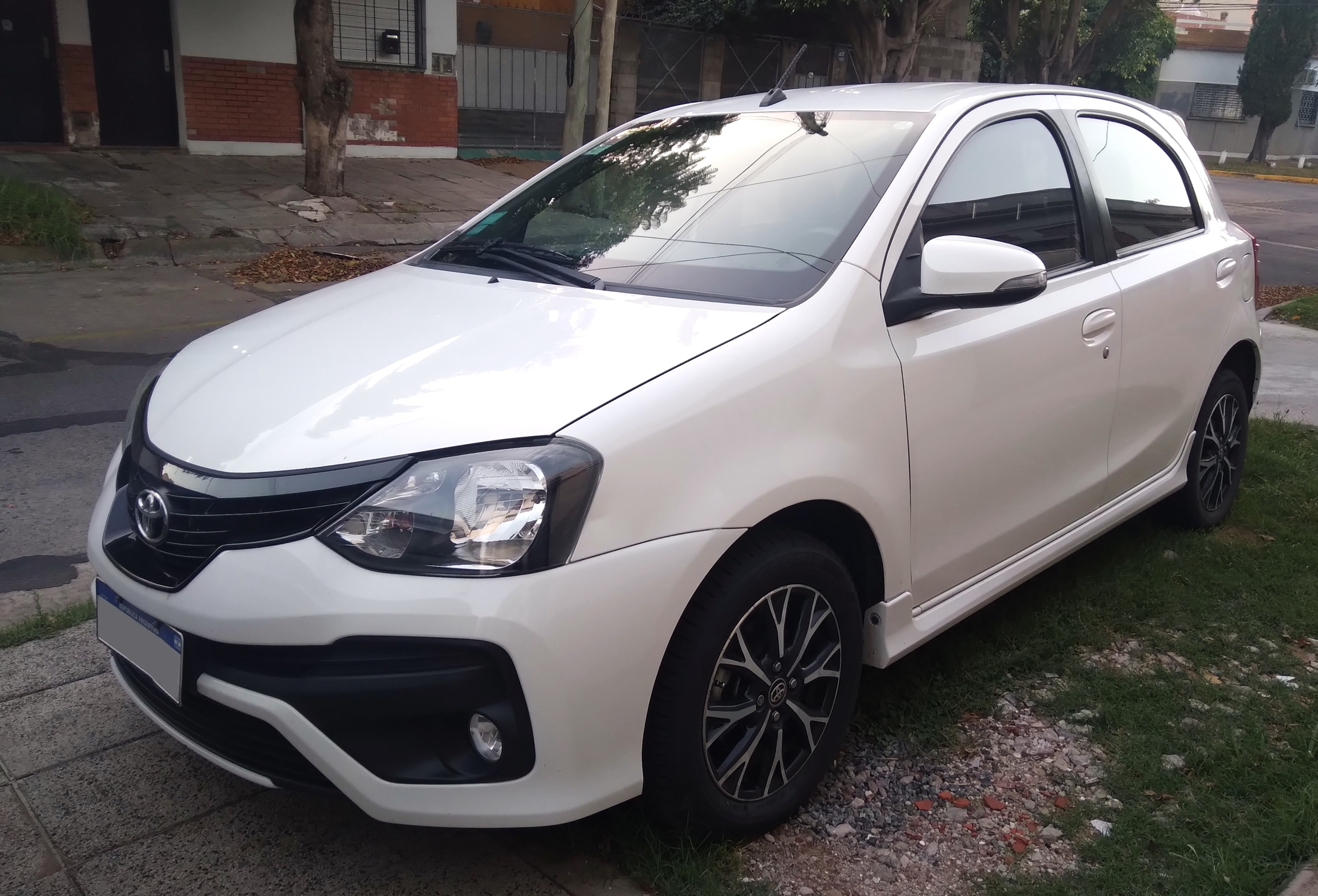
2018 Toyota Etios 1.5 XLS (facelift, Argentina)

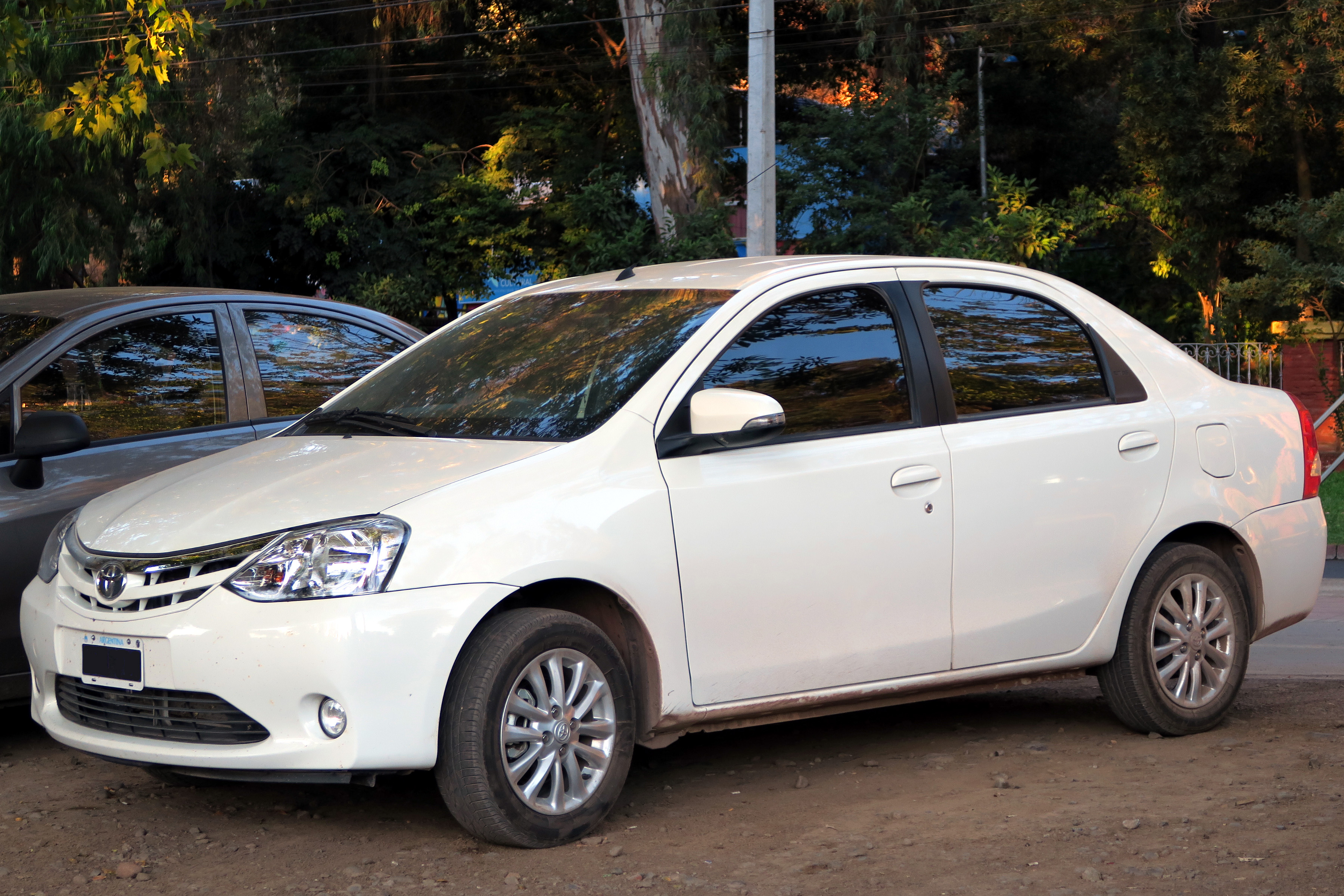
Etios saloon (pre-facelift)

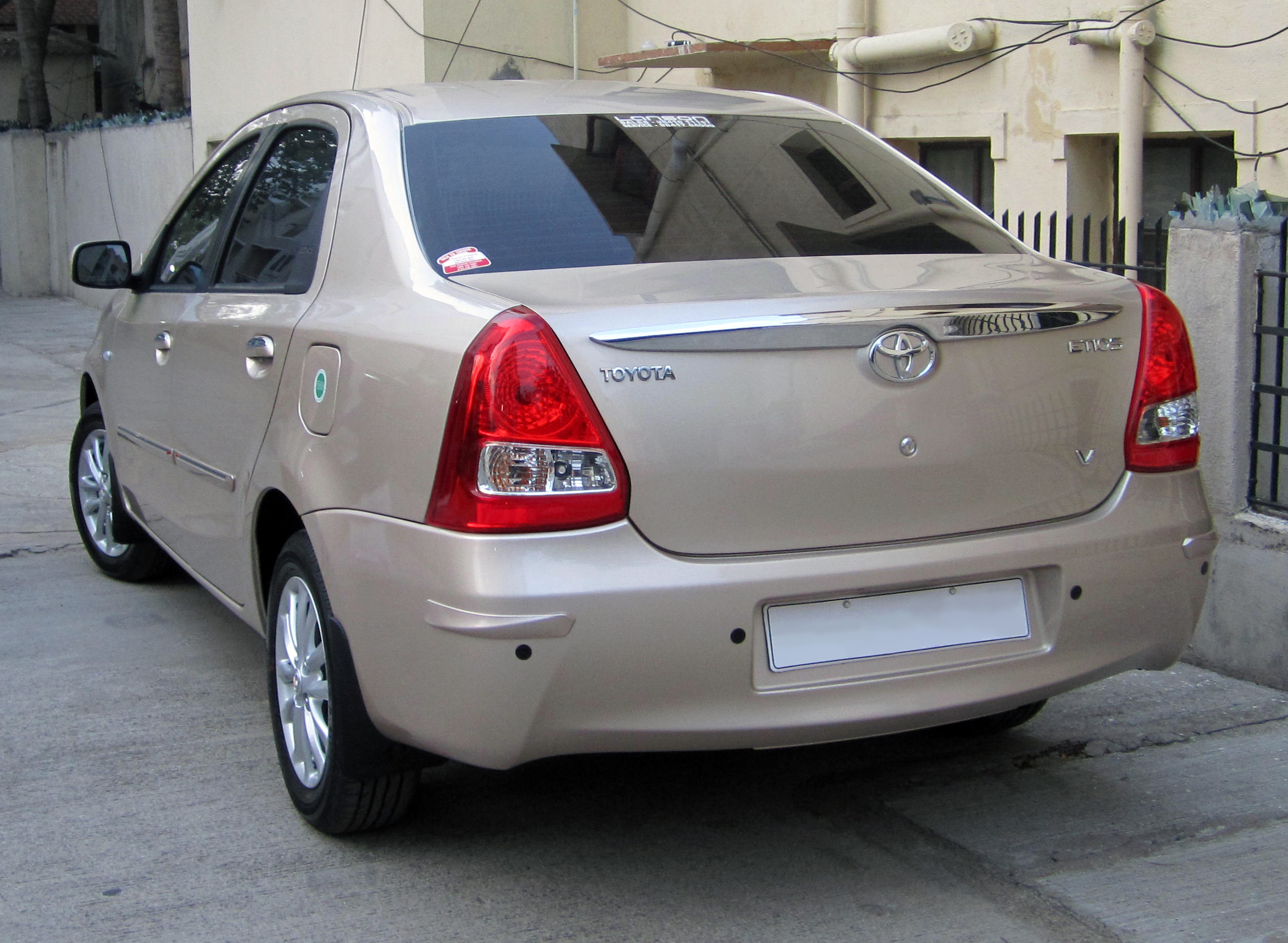
Etios saloon (pre-facelift)

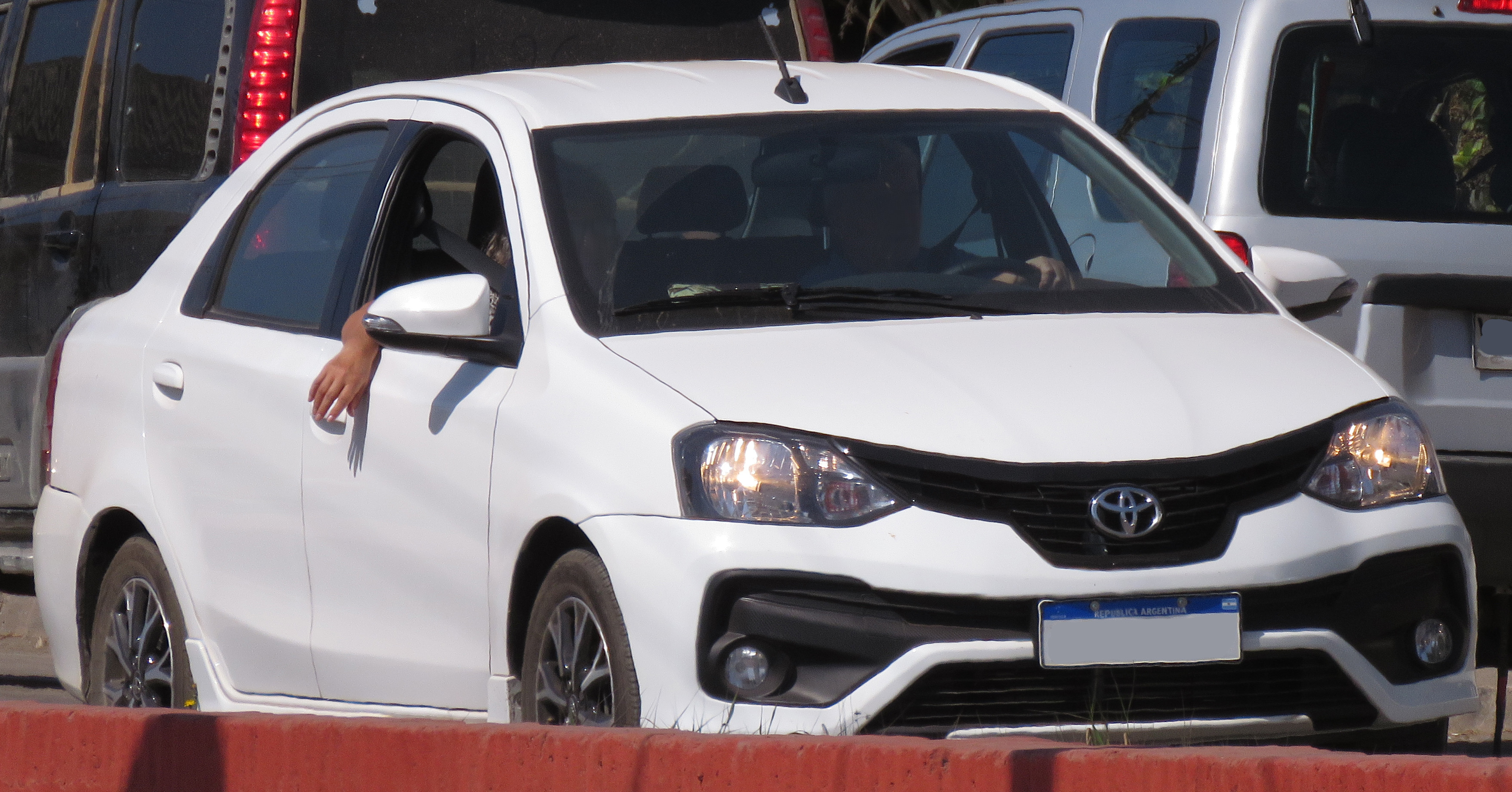
Etios saloon (facelift)

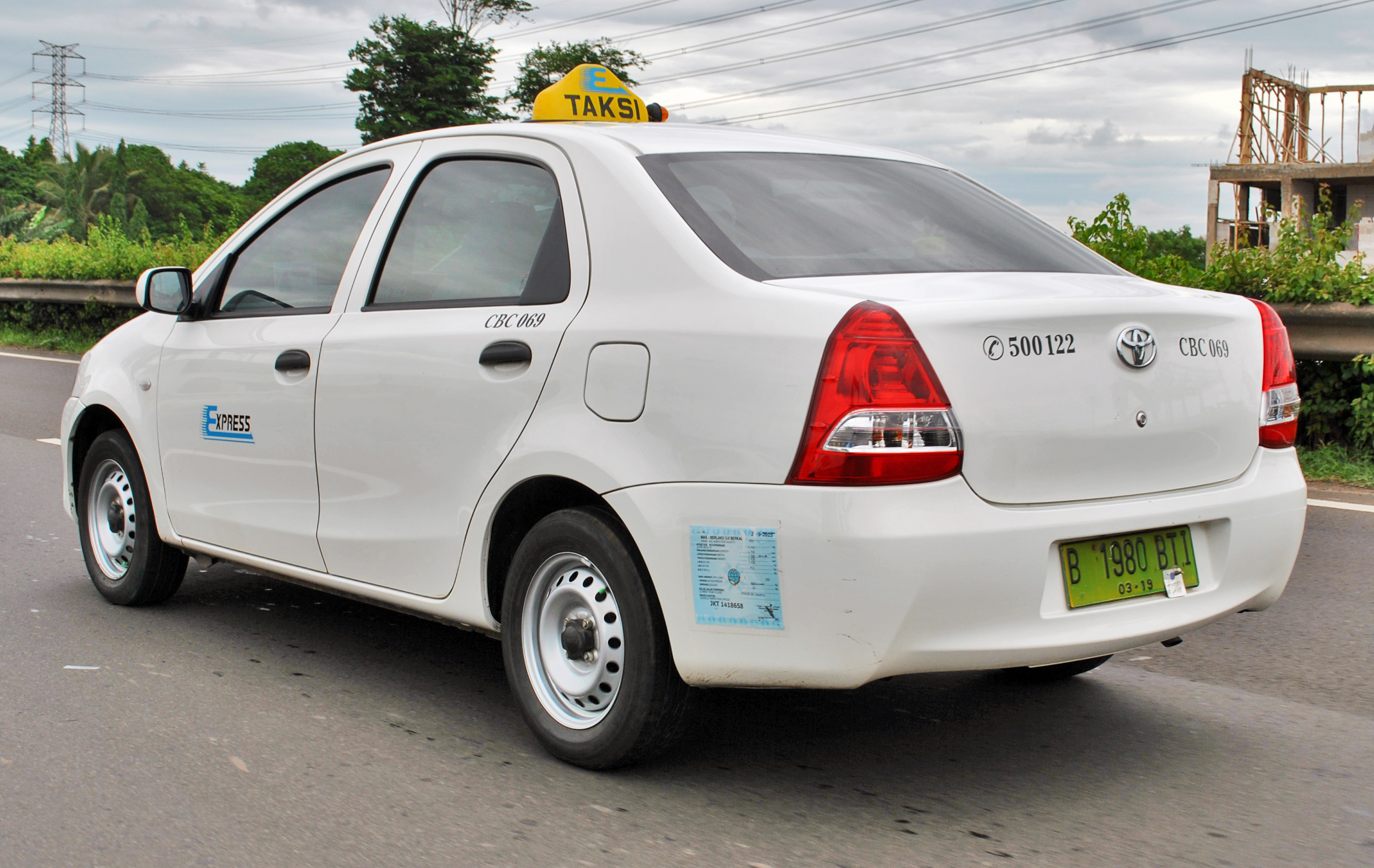
Etios saloon used as a taxicab in Indonesia

== Sales ==
| Year | India | Brazil | Argentina | Indonesia† | South Africa |
|---|---|---|---|---|---|
| 2011 | 63,573 | | | | |
| 2012 | 73,831 | 6,972 | | | |
| 2013 | 59,982 | 62,040 | 3,332 | 12,747 | |
| 2014 | 48,742 | 66,420 | 20,135 | 10,041 | |
| 2015 | 54,650 | 60,941 | 20,858 | 5,633 | 16,270 |
| 2016 | 46,393 | 67,769 | 23,898 | 3,444 | 12,768 |
| 2017 | 37,633 | 73,387 | 32,522 | 665 | 14,686 |
| 2018 | 36,998 | 49,058 | 32,008 | | 10,410 |
| 2019 | 26,319 | 32,268 | 15,736 | | |
| 2020 | | 14,007 | 9,947 | | |
| 2021 | | 2,811 | 14,058 | | |
| 2022 | | | 17,639 | | |

† Not including the imported sedan which was used for taxis

== Motorsport ==
Toyota India started a one-make racing series in India called the Etios Motor Racing. The series started in 2012 and witnessed an overwhelming response from the Indian youngsters, there were 3,300 applicants. After a 3-round selection procedure, Toyota held 2 rounds of exhibition races in 2012, one at a purpose built race track in Chennai called the Sriperumbudur race track and other in the form of ROC (Race of Champions) in Gurgaon. The 25 selected drivers competed in the main championship held in the later half of 2013. The cars are prepared by Red Rooster Performance based in Bangalore and designed by Toyota Racing Development (TRD).

=== Etios R5 ===
Toyota Etios R5
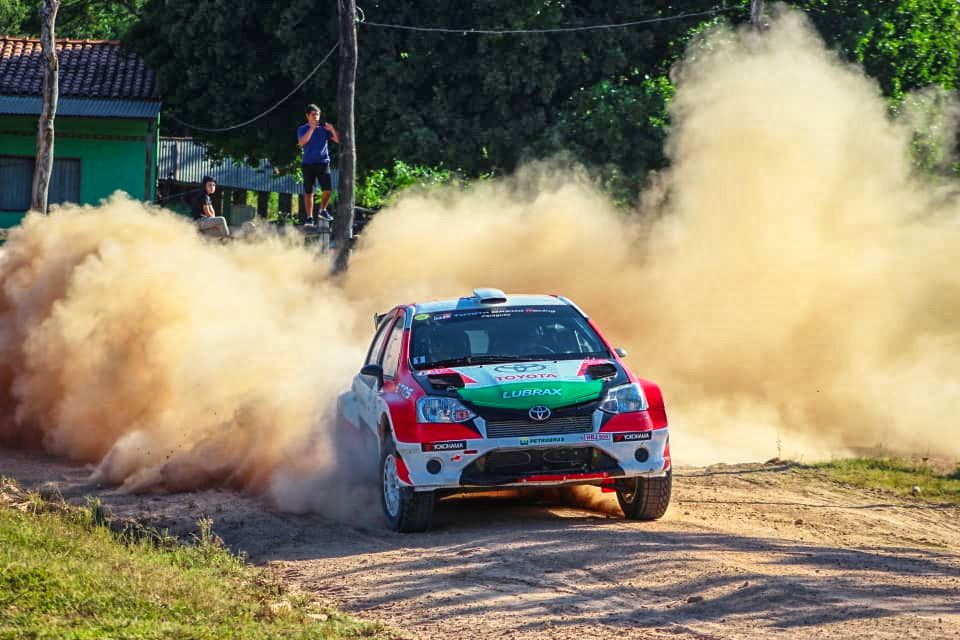
- An Etios R5 in 2020
- Category: R5
- Constructor: Toyota Gazoo Racing Paraguay
- Successor: Toyota GR Yaris Rally2

Technical specifications
- Engine: De-stroked 2ZZ-GE 1.6 L (97.6 cu in) I4 turbocharged
- Weight: 1,230 kg (2,711.7 lb)

Competition history
- Debut: (Paraguay) 2016 Petrobras Rally Trans Itapúa

The Etios R5 is a R5 rally car built by Toyota Gazoo Racing Paraguay. It is based upon the Etios road car and was launched in 2016.

== See also ==
- List of Toyota vehicles
