= Leeroy Poulter =

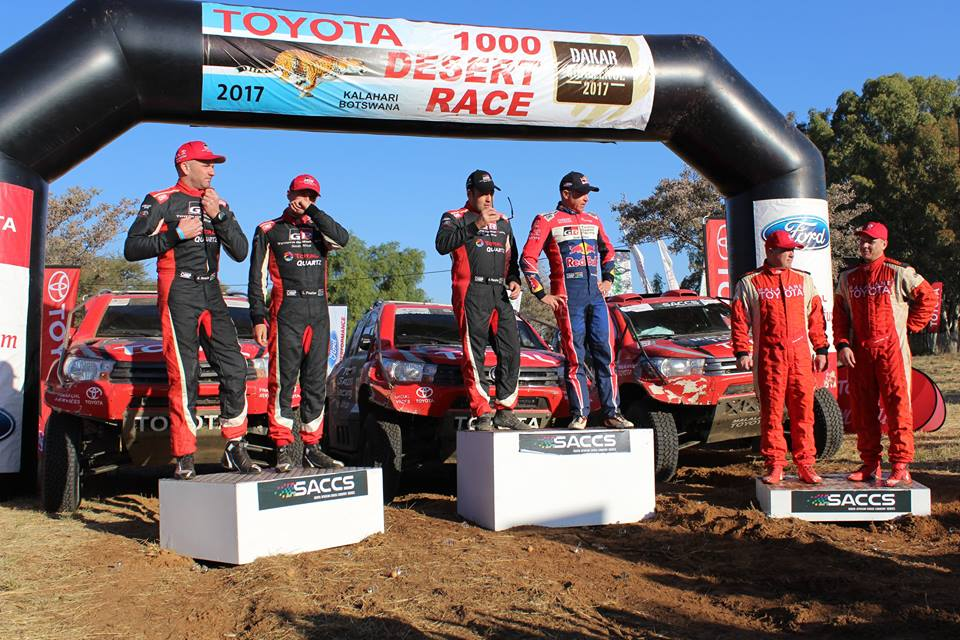
- Leeroy Poulter (2nd) and other winners, Botswana 1000km desert race 2017 Jwaneng.

Personal information
- Born: 8 March 1981 Johannesburg, South Africa

Cycling career
- Sport: Cycling
- Role: Driver

Leeroy Poulter (born 1981) is a Toyota racing team driver who has made his first appearance on Motor-Sport in the year 2014.

== Early years ==
Poulter was born in Johannesburg, South Africa on 6 March 1981 and started his love of motocross at the age of six. He turned to karting at the age of 16 years, and began to be known both nationally and at the European karting championship.

== Dakar career ==
Poulter first competed in the Dakar Rally in 2014.

Poulter is noted throughout his career for being ambitious to be in the top-five since he started participating in the race. He always made sure not to be carried away by other competitors, in that way he always strived for top-five. Poulter is a defending South African cross country racing champion, having won the title with one round to spare in 2015, and following up with a second title in 2016. He has packed three decades of motorsport into his life, starting with motor-cross in the late 1980s, Since then, he has been active in local and global karting championships, raced production cars on the track and won multiple championships. He also won the 2016 South African National Rally Championship for Toyota Gazoo Racing SA, and competes in the Dakar Rally for the same team. In 2016, he finished in the fifth place overall, and currently leads FIA in the South African championship.

== Gallery ==
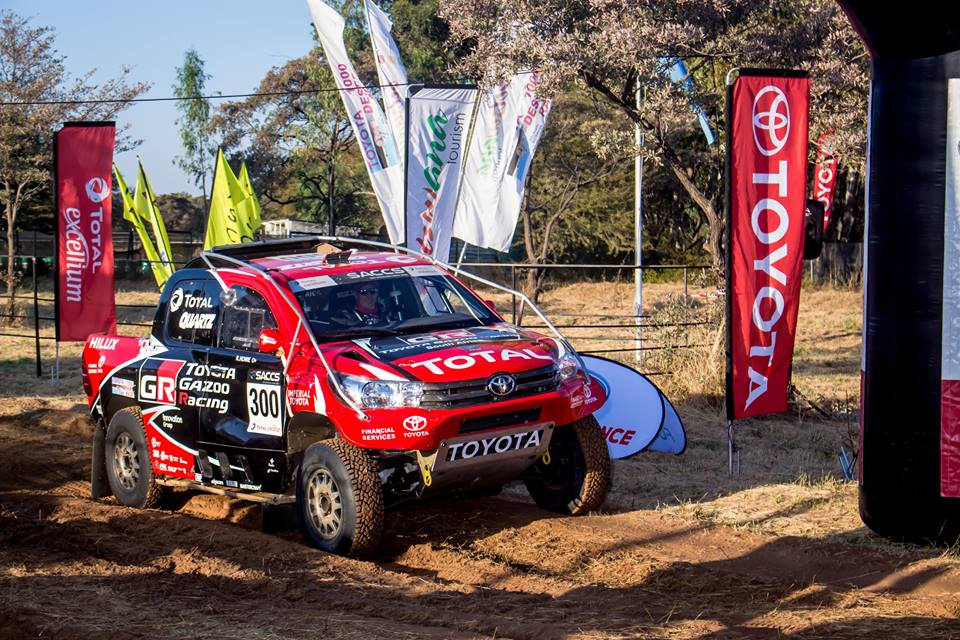
Leeroy Poulter

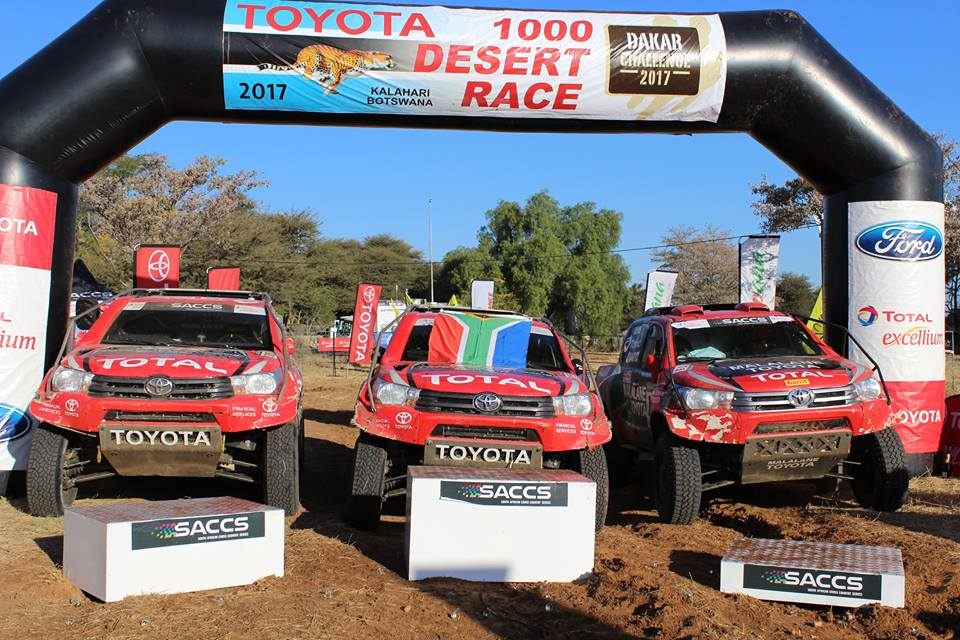
Winners of the 2017 Desert race
