= Pearl of Africa Rally =

Ugandan motorsport event

Pearl of Africa Uganda Rally or Pearl of Africa Rally Uganda (PoARU) is one of the main motorsport events in Uganda. It is part of the National Rally Championship and the FIA African Rally Championship (ARC).

== Origins ==
The first edition of the Pearl of Africa Rally was held in 1997 as an African Rally Championship candidate event. This followed the successful organisation of Burundi's Great Lakes Rally in Uganda in 1996. The Great Lakes Rally was moved to Uganda due to political instability in Burundi. Inspired by the success of the Great Lakes Rally, Uganda decided to apply for its own African Rally Championship event in 1997.

As Winston Churchill visited Uganda, he baptised the country as the ‘Pearl of Africa’, that's where this event receives its name from.

Some remarkable drivers in the history of Uganda are Sospeter Munyegera, Shekhar Mehta, Satwant Singh, Charlie Lubega, Moses Lumala, Emmanuel Katto and Chipper Adams, among others.

== Past winners of Pearl of Africa Rally ==
Source: Motor Sport Uganda and African Rally Championship

Year	Driver	Co-driver	Car	Notes
1996	(Uganda) Karim Hirji	(Uganda) Frank Nekusa	Toyota Celica ST 185	Run under FIA rules as the Great Lakes Rally, jointly with Club Automobile du Burundi
1997	(Uganda) Chipper Adams	(Uganda) Justin Beyendeza	Toyota Supra	Run as the Pearl of Africa Uganda Rally - ARC Candidate event
1998	(Uganda) Charles Muhangi	(Uganda) Steven Byaruhanga	Subaru Impreza	
1999	(Uganda) Chipper Adams	(Uganda) Justin Beyendeza	Toyota Supra	
2000	(Uganda) Charlie Lubega	(Uganda) Abed Musa	Mitsubishi Lancer Evo 4	
2002	(South Africa) Johnny Gemmel	(South Africa) Robert Paisley	Subaru Impreza WRX	
2003	(Uganda) Charlie Lubega	(Uganda) Abed Musa	Mitsubishi Lancer Evo 4	
2004	(Uganda) Charlie Lubega	(Uganda) Abed Musa	Mitsubishi Lancer Evo 4	
2005	(Uganda) Riyaz Kurji	(Uganda) Sayed Kadri	Subaru Impreza N10	
2006	(Kenya) Riyaz Kurji	(Kenya) Sayed Kadri	Subaru Impreza N8	Crew run under Kenyan Licence
2007	(Zimbabwe) Conrad Rautenbach	(Zimbabwe) Peter Marsh	Subaru Impreza N10	
2008	(Zimbabwe) Jamie Whyte	(Zimbabwe) Phil Archenoul	Subaru Impreza N10	
2009	(Kenya) Riyaz Kurji	(Kenya) Sayed Kadri	Subaru Impreza N8	Prize granted posthumously
2010	(Zimbabwe) Jamie Whyte	(Zimbabwe) Phil Archenoul	Subaru Impreza N10	
2011	(Uganda) Ponsiano Lwakataka	(Uganda) Musa Nsubuga	Subaru Impreza N8	
2012	(Zambia) Mohammed Essa	(Zambia) Greg Stead	Subaru Impreza N12	
2013	(Uganda) Jas Mangat	(Kenya) Gihan de Silva	Mitsubishi Lancer Evo X	
2014	(Kenya) Rajbir Rai	(Kenya) Tim Challen	Mitsubishi Lancer Evo X	
2015	(Kenya) Jaspreet Singh Chatthe	(United Kingdom) Craig Thorley	Mitsubishi Lancer Evo X	
2016	(Uganda) Hassan Alwi	(Uganda) Enock Olinga	Subaru Impreza STi N14	
2017	(Kenya) Manvir Singh Baryan	(United Kingdom) Drew Sturrock	Škoda Fabia R5	
2018	(Kenya) Manvir Singh Baryan	(United Kingdom) Drew Sturrock	Škoda Fabia R5	
2019	(Kenya) Manvir Singh Baryan	(United Kingdom) Drew Sturrock	Škoda Fabia R5	
2020	Cancelled due to COVID			
2021	Cancelled due to COVID			
2022	(Uganda) Jas Mangat	(Uganda) Joseph Kamya	Mitsubishi Lancer Evo X	
