= Muna Singh =

Muna Singh Sr.
- Nationality: Zambian
- Born: Herminder Singh Bhandair; 8 March 1970 Tanzania
- Died: 13 April 2023 (aged 53) India
- Relatives: Satwant Singh
- Debut season: 1987
- Years active: 1987–2019
- Teams: Dirtstar Racing Team Zambia
- Co-driver: David Sihoka
- Championships: Africa Rally Championship
- Wins: 2017 Skyview Barn Rally 2017 Meanwood Monze Rally; 2016 Madmax Rally; 2010 Zambia International Rally; 2009 Zambia International Rally; 2008 Rally of Tanzania; 2007 Zambia International Rally; 2004 Dunlop Zimbabwe Challenge Rally; 2001 Shell Spectra Zambia International Rally; 2000 Rains End Rally; 2000 Gangat Memorial Rally 1998 Lusaka Challenge Rally
- Podiums: 2003 Africa Rally Champion; 2004 Africa Rally Champion

Muna Singh Sr.(Herminder Singh Bhandhair, 8 March 1970 – 13 April 2023) was a Zambian rally driver who was a two-time African rally Champion in 2004 and 2005. He was also a four-time Zambia National Champion in 2001, 2007, 2009 and 2010.

== Background and education ==
Singh was born to Guru Singh, a rally driver, in Tanzania on 8 March 1970 and his family moved to Zambia in 1973. According to a 2019 interview, Singh attended Northmead Primary School as well as Jacaranda Primary School in Lusaka. He then attended Kabulonga Boys High School and Lake Road PTA School for his secondary education.

== Career ==
=== Motorsport ===
Racing in a Datsun 1200, Singh started competitive racing in the 1987 Zambia International Rally and finished eighth overall. He raced competitively locally and on the continent through the years and was a four-time Zambia National Champion in 2001, 2007, 2009 and 2010.

=== Administration ===
After retiring from active racing, Singh was elected as the head of the FIA African Region replacing Surinder Thatti. He also served as the chairperson for the Confederation of African Countries in Motorsport. He was an FIA Observer for a number of Africa Rally Championship events such as the 2014 KCB Safari Rally, the 2014 Pearl of Africa Rally. He was also a member of the International Automobile Federation Rallies Commission.

=== Business ===
Having worked with his father, in 1988, Singh started managing a motor workshop that had been started by his father.

== Awards and accolades ==
Together with his navigator/co-driver, David Sihoka, Singh was the African Rally Champion twice in 2004 and 2005.

== Personal life ==
Having developed liver cirrhosis, Singh had a liver transplant in January 2023. He later developed a heart infection to which he succumbed to in April 2023.

Singh was married to Natalie Singh and together they had five children including Jasmeen Ticklay Singh, Muna Singh Junior as well as Jassy Singh, the 2012 Zambia National Champion. Singh was also the nephew of Satwant Singh, an eight-time Africa Rally Champion.

Singh was also a born again Christian since 2007.

== See also ==
- Satwant Singh
- Zambia International Motor Rally
- Africa Rally Championship
