= Carl Tundo =

Kenyan racing driver

Personal information
- Nationality: Kenyan
- Born: 11 December 1973 (age 52); Nairobi, Kenya

World Rally Championship record
- Years active: 2002–present
- Co-driver: Matthew Luckhurst; Tim Jessop
- Teams: Menengai Racing Minti Motorsport
- Rallies: 6
- Championships: 0
- Rally wins: 0
- Podiums: 0
- Stage wins: 0
- Total points: 2
- First rally: 2002 Safari Rally
- Last rally: 2025 Safari Rally

Carl "Flash" Tundo (born 11 December 1973 in Nairobi) is a Kenyan rally driver. He is a five times winner of the Safari Rally. In 2009, it was a round of the Intercontinental Rally Challenge, making Tundo the first and only Kenyan winner of an IRC round. His co-driver has been Tim Jessop since 2002.

Tundo is the son of Kenyan rally driver Frank Tundo.

Tundo competed twice in the WRC Safari Rally, in 2002 and in 2021.

== Race wins ==
- Safari Rally: 2004, 2009, 2011, 2012, 2018
- Guru Nanak Rally: 2011, 2012, 2017
- East African Safari Classic Rally: 2017 (shared with Ryan Champion)
