= List of 1991 motorsport champions =

1991 motorsport champions
Previous: 1990	Next: 1992

This list of 1991 motorsport champions is a list of national or international auto racing series with a Championship decided by the points or positions earned by a driver from multiple races.

== Dirt oval racing ==
Series	Champion	Refer
World of Outlaws Sprint Car Series	(United States) Steve Kinser	
World of Outlaws Sprint Car Series	Teams: (United States) Karl Kinser Racing	

== Drag racing ==
Series	Champion	Refer
NHRA Winston Drag Racing Series	Top Fuel: (United States) Joe Amato	1991 NHRA Winston Drag Racing Series
NHRA Winston Drag Racing Series	Funny Car: (United States) John Force	1991 NHRA Winston Drag Racing Series
NHRA Winston Drag Racing Series	Pro Stock: (United States) Darrell Alderman	1991 NHRA Winston Drag Racing Series
NHRA Winston Drag Racing Series	Pro Stock Motorcycle: (United States) Dave Schultz	1991 NHRA Winston Drag Racing Series

== Karting ==
Series	Driver	Season article
CIK-FIA Karting World Championship	FK: (Italy) Jarno Trulli	
CIK-FIA Karting World Championship	Formula A: (Italy) Alessandro Manetti	
CIK-FIA Karting World Championship	FC: (Italy) Alessandro Piccini	
CIK-FIA Junior World Cup	(France) Sébastien Philippe	
CIK-FIA Karting European Championship	FSA: (Italy) Massimiliano Orsini	
CIK-FIA Karting European Championship	ICC: (Italy) Roberto Motagnani	
CIK-FIA Karting European Championship	FA: (Italy) Alessandro Manetti	
CIK-FIA Karting European Championship	ICA: (Italy) Daniele Parrilla	
CIK-FIA Karting European Championship	ICA-J: (Spain) Jordi Suralles	
World Superkart Championship	(United Kingdom) Martin Hines (Netherlands) Perry Grondstra	

== Motorcycle racing ==
Series	Rider	Season article
500cc World Championship	(United States) Wayne Rainey	1991 Grand Prix motorcycle racing season
250cc World Championship	(Italy) Luca Cadalora	1991 Grand Prix motorcycle racing season
125cc World Championship	(Italy) Loris Capirossi	1991 Grand Prix motorcycle racing season
Superbike World Championship	(United States) Doug Polen	1991 Superbike World Championship season
Speedway World Championship	(Denmark) Jan O. Pedersen	1991 Individual Speedway World Championship
AMA Superbike Championship	(United States) Thomas Stevens	
Australian Superbike Championship	(New Zealand) Aaron Slight	

== Open wheel racing ==
Series	Driver	Season article
FIA Formula One World Championship	(Brazil) Ayrton Senna	1991 Formula One World Championship
FIA Formula One World Championship	Constructors: (United Kingdom) McLaren-Honda	1991 Formula One World Championship
International Formula 3000	(Brazil) Christian Fittipaldi	1991 International Formula 3000 Championship
CART PPG Indy Car World Series	(United States) Michael Andretti	1991 CART PPG Indy Car World Series
CART PPG Indy Car World Series	Manufacturers: (United States) Chevrolet	1991 CART PPG Indy Car World Series
CART PPG Indy Car World Series	Rookies: (United States) Jeff Andretti	1991 CART PPG Indy Car World Series
Indy Lights Series	(Belgium) Éric Bachelart	1991 Indy Lights season
All-Japan Formula 3000 Championship	(Japan) Ukyo Katayama	1991 Japanese Formula 3000 Championship
American Indycar Series	(United States) Bill Tempero	1991 American Indycar Series
Toyota Atlantic Championship	(Philippines) Jovy Marcelo	1991 Atlantic Championship
Australian Drivers' Championship	(Australia) Mark Skaife	1991 Australian Drivers' Championship
Barber Saab Pro Series	(United States) Bryan Herta	1991 Barber Saab Pro Series
British Formula 3000	(United Kingdom) Paul Warwick	1991 British Formula 3000 Championship
Formula Crane 45	(Japan) Masatomo Shimizu	1991 Formula Crane 45 season
Formula König	(Germany) Dirk Kisters	1991 Formula König season
Formula König	Teams: (Germany) Clever Automobil Club	1991 Formula König season
Formula Toyota	(Japan) Eiichi Tajima	1991 Formula Toyota season
Formula Toyota	West: (Japan) Hidehiro Mochizuki	1991 Formula Toyota season
Star Mazda Championship	(United States) Mark Rodriguez	1991 Star Mazda Championship
USAC FF2000 Championship	(United States) Craig Taylor	1991 USAC FF2000 Championship
Formula Three
All-Japan Formula Three Championship	(Brazil) Paulo Carcasci	1991 All-Japan Formula Three Championship
All-Japan Formula Three Championship	Teams: (Japan) TOM'S	1991 All-Japan Formula Three Championship
Austria Formula 3 Cup	(Austria) Josef Neuhauser	1991 Austria Formula 3 Cup
Brazilian Formula Three Championship	(Brazil) Marcos Gueiros	1991 Brazilian Formula Three Championship
Brazilian Formula Three Championship	Teams: (Brazil) Césario Fórmula	1991 Brazilian Formula Three Championship
British Formula Three Championship	(Brazil) Rubens Barrichello	1991 British Formula Three Championship
British Formula Three Championship	National: (Finland) Pekka Herva	1991 British Formula Three Championship
Chilean Formula Three Championship	(Chile) Giuseppe Bacigalupo	1991 Chilean Formula Three Championship
French Formula Three Championship	(France) Christophe Bouchut	1991 French Formula Three Championship
French Formula Three Championship	Teams: (France) Graff Racing	1991 French Formula Three Championship
German Formula Three Championship	(Denmark) Tom Kristensen	1991 German Formula Three Championship
German Formula Three Championship	B: (Germany) Mathias Arlt	1991 German Formula Three Championship
Italian Formula Three Championship	(Italy) Giambattista Busi	1991 Italian Formula Three Championship
Italian Formula Three Championship	Teams: (Italy) PiEmme Motors	1991 Italian Formula Three Championship
Mexican Formula Three Championship	(Mexico) Adrián Fernández	1991 Mexican Formula Three Championship
Formula Three Sudamericana	(Brazil) Affonso Giaffone	1991 Formula 3 Sudamericana
Swiss Formula Three Championship	(Switzerland) Jo Zeller	1991 Swiss Formula Three Championship
Formula Renault
French Formula Renault Championship	(France) Olivier Couvreur	1991 French Formula Renault Championship
Formula Renault Argentina	(Argentina) Omar Martínez	1991 Formula Renault Argentina
Rencontres Internationales de Formule Renault	(United Kingdom) Jason Plato	
Rencontres Internationales de Formule Renault	Teams: (United Kingdom) Duckhams Van Diemen	
Formula Renault Sport UK	(United Kingdom) Bobby Verdon-Roe	1991 Formula Renault Sport UK
Formula Renault Sport UK	Teams: (United Kingdom) Fortec Motorsport	1991 Formula Renault Sport UK
Formula Renault Netherlands	(Netherlands) Frank ten Wolde	1991 Formula Renault Netherlands
Formula Renault Netherlands	Teams: (Netherlands) Nomag Racing	1991 Formula Renault Netherlands
Formula Renault Germany	(Germany) Joachim Beule	1991 Formula Renault Germany
Spanish Formula Renault Championship	(Spain) Antonio Albacete	1991 Spanish Formula Renault Championship
Formula Ford
Australian Formula Ford Championship	(Australia) Troy Dunstan	1991 Motorcraft Formula Ford Driver to Europe Series
Brazilian Formula Ford Championship	(Brazil) Luiz Garcia Jr.	1991 Brazilian Formula Ford Championship
British Formula Ford Championship	(Belgium) Marc Goossens	1991 British Formula Ford Championship
Danish Formula Ford Championship	(Denmark) Steffen Nielsen	
Dutch Formula Ford 1600 Championship	(Belgium) Vincent Radermecker	1991 Dutch Formula Ford 1600 Championship
Formula Mirage	(Japan) Eiji Yamada	1991 Formula Mirage season
Finnish Formula Ford Championship	(Finland) Tomi Veijalainen	
German Formula Ford Championship	(Switzerland) Christian Fischer	
New Zealand Formula Ford Championship	(New Zealand) Andy McElrea	1990–91 New Zealand Formula Ford Championship
Spanish Formula Ford Championship	(Spain) Miguel Ángel de Castro	
Swedish Formula Ford Championship	(Sweden) Niclas Jönsson	

== Rallying ==
Series	Driver/Co-Driver	Season article
World Rally Championship	(Finland) Juha Kankkunen	1991 World Rally Championship
World Rally Championship	Co-Drivers: (Finland) Juha Piironen	1991 World Rally Championship
World Rally Championship	Manufacturer: (Italy) Lancia	1991 World Rally Championship
FIA Cup for Production Cars	(Belgium) Grégoire De Mévius	1991 World Rally Championship
African Rally Championship	(Zambia) Satwant Singh	1991 African Rally Championship
Asia-Pacific Rally Championship	(Australia) Ross Dunkerton	1991 Asia-Pacific Rally Championship
Asia-Pacific Rally Championship	Co-Drivers: (Lithuania) Fred Gocentas	1991 Asia-Pacific Rally Championship
Australian Rally Championship	(Australia) Robert Herridge	1991 Australian Rally Championship
Australian Rally Championship	Co-Drivers: (Australia) Steve Vanderbyl	1991 Australian Rally Championship
British Rally Championship	(United Kingdom) Colin McRae	1991 British Rally Championship
British Rally Championship	Co-Drivers: (United Kingdom) Derek Ringer	1991 British Rally Championship
Canadian Rally Championship	(Canada) Frank Sprongl	1991 Canadian Rally Championship
Canadian Rally Championship	Co-Drivers: (Canada) Dan Sprongl	1991 Canadian Rally Championship
Deutsche Rallye Meisterschaft	(Germany) Erwin Weber	
Estonian Rally Championship	(Estonia) Ivar Raidam	1990 Estonian Rally Championship
Estonian Rally Championship	Co-Drivers: (Estonia) Margus Karjane	1990 Estonian Rally Championship
European Rally Championship	(Italy) Piero Liatti	1991 European Rally Championship
European Rally Championship	Co-Drivers: (Italy) Luciano Tedeschini	1991 European Rally Championship
Finnish Rally Championship	Group A +2000cc: (Finland) Lasse Lampi	1991 Finnish Rally Championship
Finnish Rally Championship	Group N +2000cc: (Finland) Marcus Grönholm	1991 Finnish Rally Championship
Finnish Rally Championship	Group A -2000cc: (Finland) Jarmo Kytölehto	1991 Finnish Rally Championship
Finnish Rally Championship	Group N -2000cc: (Finland) Ari Saxberg	1991 Finnish Rally Championship
French Rally Championship	(France) Bernard Béguin	
Hungarian Rally Championship	(Hungary) László Ranga	
Hungarian Rally Championship	Co-Drivers: (Hungary) Ernő Büki	
Indian National Rally Championship	(India) N. Leelakrishnan	
Indian National Rally Championship	Co-Drivers: (India) N. Mahindran	
Italian Rally Championship	(Italy) Dario Cerrato	
Italian Rally Championship	Co-Drivers: (Italy) Giuseppe Cerri	
Italian Rally Championship	Manufacturers: (Italy) Lancia	
Middle East Rally Championship	(United Arab Emirates) Mohammed Ben Sulayem	
New Zealand Rally Championship	(New Zealand) Possum Bourne	1991 New Zealand Rally Championship
New Zealand Rally Championship	Co-Drivers: (New Zealand) Rodger Freeth	1991 New Zealand Rally Championship
Polish Rally Championship	(Poland) Marian Bublewicz	
Romanian Rally Championship	(Romania) Ludovic Balint (Romania) Constantin Duval	
Scottish Rally Championship	(United Kingdom) Donald Milne	
Scottish Rally Championship	Co-Drivers: (United Kingdom) Bob Wilson	
South African National Rally Championship	(South Africa) Hannes Grobler	
South African National Rally Championship	Co-Drivers: (South Africa) Franz Boshoff	
South African National Rally Championship	Manufacturers: (Germany) Volkswagen	
Spanish Rally Championship	(Spain) Jose María Ponce	
Spanish Rally Championship	Co-Drivers: (Spain) Juan Carlos Deniz	

=== Rallycross ===
Series	Driver	Season article
FIA European Rallycross Championship	Div 1: (Sweden) Kenneth Hansen	
FIA European Rallycross Championship	Div 2: (Norway) Martin Schanche	
British Rallycross Championship	(United Kingdom) Will Gollop	

=== Ice racing ===
Series	Driver	Season article
Andros Trophy	(France) Maurice Chomat	1990–91 Andros Trophy

== Sports car and GT ==
Series	Driver	Season article
World Sportscar Championship	(Italy) Teo Fabi	1991 World Sportscar Championship season
World Sportscar Championship	Teams: (United Kingdom) Silk Cut Jaguar	1991 World Sportscar Championship season
IMSA GT Championship	GTP: (Australia) Geoff Brabham	1991 IMSA GT Championship season
IMSA GT Championship	Lights: (United States) Parker Johnstone	1991 IMSA GT Championship season
IMSA GT Championship	GTO: (United States) Pete Halsmer	1991 IMSA GT Championship season
IMSA GT Championship	AAC: (United States) Dick Greer	1991 IMSA GT Championship season
IMSA GT Championship	GTU: (United States) John Fergus	1991 IMSA GT Championship season
Porsche Supercup, Porsche Carrera Cup, GT3 Cup Challenge and Porsche Sprint Challenge
Porsche Carrera Cup France	(France) Jean-Pierre Malcher	1991 Porsche Carrera Cup France
Porsche Carrera Cup Germany	(Germany) Roland Asch	1991 Porsche Carrera Cup Germany
Porsche Carrera Cup Germany	Teams: (Germany) Strähle Autosport	1991 Porsche Carrera Cup Germany

== Stock car racing ==
Series	Driver	Season article
NASCAR Winston Cup Series	(United States) Dale Earnhardt	1991 NASCAR Winston Cup Series
NASCAR Winston Cup Series	Manufacturers: (United States) Chevrolet	1991 NASCAR Winston Cup Series
NASCAR Busch Grand National Series	(United States) Bobby Labonte	1991 NASCAR Busch Series
NASCAR Busch Grand National Series	Manufacturers: (United States) Oldsmobile	1991 NASCAR Busch Series
NASCAR Busch North Series	(United States) Ricky Craven	1991 NASCAR Busch North Series
NASCAR Winston West Series	(United States) Bill Sedgwick	1991 NASCAR Winston West Series
ARCA Bondo/Mar-Hyde Series	(United States) Bill Venturini	1991 ARCA Bondo/Mar-Hyde Series
International Race of Champions	(United States) Rusty Wallace	IROC XV
AUSCAR	(Australia) Brad Jones	1990–91 AUSCAR season
Australian Super Speedway Championship	(Australia) Robin Best	1990–91 Australian Super Speedway Championship
Turismo Carretera	(Argentina) Oscar Aventín	1991 Turismo Carretera

== Touring car ==
Series	Driver	Season article
Australian Touring Car Championship	(New Zealand) Jim Richards	1991 Australian Touring Car Championship
Australian Endurance Championship	(Australia) Mark Gibbs (Australia) Rohan Onslow	1991 Australian Endurance Championship
British Touring Car Championship	(United Kingdom) Will Hoy	1991 British Touring Car Championship
British Touring Car Championship	Manufacturers: (Germany) BMW	1991 British Touring Car Championship
Campeonato Brasileiro de Marcas e Pilotos	(Brazil) Paulo Gomes (Brazil) Claudio Girotto	1991 Campeonato Brasileiro de Marcas e Pilotos
Deutsche Tourenwagen Meisterschaft	(Germany) Frank Biela	1991 Deutsche Tourenwagen Meisterschaft
French Supertouring Championship	(France) Xavier Lapeyre	
Italian Touring Car Championship	(Italy) Roberto Ravaglia	
Japanese Touring Car Championship	(Japan) Masahiro Hasemi	1991 Japanese Touring Car Championship
Japanese Touring Car Championship	JTC-2: (Austria) Roland Ratzenberger	1991 Japanese Touring Car Championship
Japanese Touring Car Championship	JTC-3: (Japan) Osamu Nakako	1991 Japanese Touring Car Championship
New Zealand Touring Car Championship	(New Zealand) Brett Riley	
Spanish Touring Car Championship	(Spain) Luis Pérez-Sala	1991 Campeonato de España de Turismos
Spanish Touring Car Championship	Manufacturers: (France) Citroën	1991 Campeonato de España de Turismos
Stock Car Brasil	(Brazil) Ingo Hoffmann	1991 Stock Car Brasil season
TC2000 Championship	(Argentina) Juan María Traverso	1991 TC2000 Championship

== Truck racing ==
Series	Driver	Season article
European Truck Racing Championship	Class A: (United Kingdom) Richard Walker	1991 European Truck Racing Championship
European Truck Racing Championship	Class B: (Finland) Jokke Kallio	1991 European Truck Racing Championship
European Truck Racing Championship	Class C: (Germany) Gerd Körber	1991 European Truck Racing Championship

== See also ==
- List of motorsport championships
- Auto racing
