= List of 1990 motorsport champions =

1990 motorsport champions
Previous: 1989	Next: 1991

This list of 1990 motorsport champions is a list of national or international auto racing series with a Championship decided by the points or positions earned by a driver from multiple races.

== Dirt oval racing ==
Series	Champion	Refer
World of Outlaws Sprint Car Series	(United States) Steve Kinser	
World of Outlaws Sprint Car Series	Teams: (United States) Karl Kinser Racing	

== Drag racing ==
Series	Champion	Refer
NHRA Winston Drag Racing Series	Top Fuel: (United States) Joe Amato	1990 NHRA Winston Drag Racing Series
NHRA Winston Drag Racing Series	Funny Car: (United States) John Force	1990 NHRA Winston Drag Racing Series
NHRA Winston Drag Racing Series	Pro Stock: (United States) Darrell Alderman	1990 NHRA Winston Drag Racing Series
NHRA Winston Drag Racing Series	Pro Stock Motorcycle: (United States) John Myers	1990 NHRA Winston Drag Racing Series

== Karting ==
Series	Driver	Season article
CIK-FIA Karting World Championship	FK: (Denmark) Jan Magnussen	
CIK-FIA Karting World Championship	Formula A: (Italy) Danilo Rossi	
CIK-FIA Karting World Championship	FC: (Italy) Alessandro Piccini	
CIK-FIA Junior World Cup	(France) Jérémie Dufour	
CIK-FIA Karting European Championship	FK: (Netherlands) Martijn Koene	
CIK-FIA Karting European Championship	ICC: (Netherlands) Walter van Lent	
CIK-FIA Karting European Championship	FA: (Italy) Fabiano Belletti	
CIK-FIA Karting European Championship	ICA: (France) Eddy Coubard	
CIK-FIA Karting European Championship	ICA-J: (Belgium) Bas Leinders	
World Superkart Championship	(United Kingdom) Tim Parrott	

== Motorcycle racing ==
Series	Rider	Season article
500cc World Championship	(United States) Wayne Rainey	1990 Grand Prix motorcycle racing season
250cc World Championship	(United States) John Kocinski	1990 Grand Prix motorcycle racing season
125cc World Championship	(Italy) Loris Capirossi	1990 Grand Prix motorcycle racing season
Superbike World Championship	(France) Raymond Roche	1990 Superbike World Championship season
Speedway World Championship	(Sweden) Per Jonsson	1990 Individual Speedway World Championship
AMA Superbike Championship	(United States) Doug Chandler	
Australian Superbike Championship	(Australia) Malcolm Campbell	

== Open wheel racing ==
Series	Driver	Season article
FIA Formula One World Championship	(Brazil) Ayrton Senna	1990 Formula One World Championship
FIA Formula One World Championship	Constructors: (United Kingdom) McLaren-Honda	1990 Formula One World Championship
CART PPG Indy Car World Series	(United States) Al Unser Jr.	1990 CART PPG Indy Car World Series
CART PPG Indy Car World Series	Manufacturers: (United States) Chevrolet	1990 CART PPG Indy Car World Series
CART PPG Indy Car World Series	Rookies: (United States) Eddie Cheever	1990 CART PPG Indy Car World Series
American Racing Series	(Canada) Paul Tracy	1990 American Racing Series season
International Formula 3000	(France) Érik Comas	1990 International Formula 3000 season
British Formula 3000	(Portugal) Pedro Chaves	1990 British Formula 3000 Championship
All-Japan Formula 3000 Championship	(Japan) Kazuyoshi Hoshino	1990 Japanese Formula 3000 Championship
EFDA Formula Opel Lotus Euroseries	(Brazil) Rubens Barrichello	
American Indycar Series	(United States) Bill Tempero	1990 American Indycar Series
Australian Drivers' Championship	(Australia) Simon Kane	1990 Australian Drivers' Championship
Barber Saab Pro Series	(New Zealand) Rob Wilson	1990 Barber Saab Pro Series
Cup of Peace and Friendship	(Soviet Union) Alexandr Potekhin	1990 Cup of Peace and Friendship
Formula König	(Germany) Herbert Füngeling	1990 Formula König season
Formula König	Teams: (Germany) König Motorsport	1990 Formula König season
Formula Toyota	(Japan) Masami Kageyama	1990 Formula Toyota season
SCCA Formula Super Vee	(United States) Stuart Crow	1990 SCCA Formula Super Vee season
Toyota Atlantic East Coast Championship	(United States) Brian Till	1990 Toyota Atlantic East Coast Championship
Toyota Atlantic West Coast Championship	(United States) Mark Dismore	1990 Toyota Atlantic West Coast Championship
USAC FF2000 Championship	(United States) Vince Puleo Jr.	1990 USAC FF2000 Championship
Formula Three
All-Japan Formula Three Championship	(Japan) Naoki Hattori	1990 All-Japan Formula Three Championship
All-Japan Formula Three Championship	Teams: (Japan) Le Garage Cox Racing	1990 All-Japan Formula Three Championship
Austria Formula 3 Cup	(Austria) Josef Neuhauser	1990 Austria Formula 3 Cup
Brazilian Formula Three Championship	(Brazil) Oswaldo Negri Jr.	1990 Brazilian Formula Three Championship
Brazilian Formula Three Championship	Teams: (Brazil) Daccar	1990 Brazilian Formula Three Championship
British Formula Three Championship	(Finland) Mika Häkkinen	1990 British Formula Three Championship
British Formula Three Championship	National: (United Kingdom) Charles Rickett	1990 British Formula Three Championship
Chilean Formula Three Championship	(Chile) Kurt Horta	1990 Chilean Formula Three Championship
Formula 3 Sudamericana	(Brazil) Christian Fittipaldi	
French Formula Three Championship	(France) Éric Hélary	
German Formula Three Championship	(Germany) Michael Schumacher	1990 German Formula Three Championship
German Formula Three Championship	B: (Austria) Franz Binder	1990 German Formula Three Championship
Italian Formula Three Championship	(Italy) Roberto Colciago	
Mexican Formula Three Championship	(Mexico) Carlos Guerrero	1990 Mexican Formula Three Championship
Formula 3 Sweden	(Sweden) Niclas Jönsson	
Swiss Formula Three Championship	(Switzerland) Jo Zeller	1990 Swiss Formula Three Championship
Formula Renault
French Formula Renault Championship	(France) Emmanuel Collard	1990 French Formula Renault Championship
Formula Renault Argentina	(Argentina) Omar Martínez	1990 Formula Renault Argentina
Formula Renault Sport UK	(Brazil) Thomas Erdos	1990 Formula Renault Sport UK
Formula Renault Sport UK	Teams: (United Kingdom) Fortec Motorsport	1990 Formula Renault Sport UK
Formula Ford
Australian Formula Ford Championship	(Australia) Russell Ingall	
Brazilian Formula Ford Championship	(Brazil) Paulo Garcia	1990 Brazilian Formula Ford Championship
British Formula Ford Championship	(Netherlands) Michael Vergers	1990 British Formula Ford Championship
Danish Formula Ford Championship	(Denmark) Steffen Nielsen	
Dutch Formula Ford 1600 Championship	(Netherlands) Frank ten Wolde	1990 Dutch Formula Ford 1600 Championship
Finnish Formula Ford Championship	(Finland) Tomi Salomaa	
German Formula Ford Championship	(Germany) Ralf Druckenmüller	
Formula Mirage	(Japan) Keiichi Tsuchiya	1990 Formula Mirage season
New Zealand Formula Ford Championship	(New Zealand) Paul Larsen	
Portuguese Formula Ford Championship	(Portugal) Pedro Couceiro	
Spanish Formula Ford Championship	(Spain) Pedro de la Rosa	
Swedish Formula Ford Championship	(Sweden) Niclas Jönsson	

== Rallying ==
Series	Driver/Co-Driver	Season article
World Rally Championship	(Spain) Carlos Sainz	1990 World Rally Championship
World Rally Championship	Co-Drivers: (Spain) Luis Moya	1990 World Rally Championship
World Rally Championship	Manufacturers: (Italy) Lancia	1990 World Rally Championship
FIA Cup for Production Cars	(France) Alain Oreille (France) Michel Roissard	1990 World Rally Championship
African Rally Championship	(Burundi) Walter Costa	1990 African Rally Championship
Asia-Pacific Rally Championship	(Spain) Carlos Sainz	1990 Asia-Pacific Rally Championship
Asia-Pacific Rally Championship	Co-Drivers: (Spain) Luis Moya	1990 Asia-Pacific Rally Championship
Australian Rally Championship	(Australia) Ed Ordynski	1990 Australian Rally Championship
Australian Rally Championship	Co-Drivers: (Australia) Mark Nelson	1990 Australian Rally Championship
British Rally Championship	(United Kingdom) David Llewellin	1990 British Rally Championship
British Rally Championship	Co-Drivers: (United Kingdom) Phil Short	1990 British Rally Championship
Canadian Rally Championship	(Canada) Tom McGeer	1990 Canadian Rally Championship
Canadian Rally Championship	Co-Drivers: (Canada) Trish Sparrow	1990 Canadian Rally Championship
Deutsche Rallye Meisterschaft	(Germany) Ronald Holzer	
Estonian Rally Championship	(Estonian Soviet Socialist Republic) Aare Klooren	1990 Estonian Rally Championship
Estonian Rally Championship	Co-Drivers: (Estonian Soviet Socialist Republic) Toomas Kreek	1990 Estonian Rally Championship
European Rally Championship	(Belgium) Robert Droogmans	1990 European Rally Championship
European Rally Championship	Co-Drivers: (Belgium) Joosten Ronny	1990 European Rally Championship
Finnish Rally Championship	Group A +2000cc: (Finland) Sebastian Lindholm	1990 Finnish Rally Championship
Finnish Rally Championship	Group N +2000cc: (Finland) Arto Kumpumäki	1990 Finnish Rally Championship
Finnish Rally Championship	Group A -2000cc: (Finland) Jarmo Kytölehto	1990 Finnish Rally Championship
Finnish Rally Championship	Group N -2000cc: (Finland) Jouni Ahvenlammi	1990 Finnish Rally Championship
French Rally Championship	(France) François Chatriot	
Hungarian Rally Championship	(Hungary) Attila Ferjáncz	
Hungarian Rally Championship	Co-Drivers: (Hungary) János Tandari	
Indian National Rally Championship	(India) N. Leelakrishnan	
Indian National Rally Championship	Co-Drivers: (India) C.V. Jaykumar	
Italian Rally Championship	(Italy) Dario Cerrato	
Italian Rally Championship	Co-Drivers: (Italy) Giuseppe Cerri	
Italian Rally Championship	Manufacturers: (Italy) Lancia	
Middle East Rally Championship	(United Arab Emirates) Mohammed Ben Sulayem	
New Zealand Rally Championship	(New Zealand) David Ayling	1990 New Zealand Rally Championship
New Zealand Rally Championship	Co-Drivers: (New Zealand) Robert Haldane	1990 New Zealand Rally Championship
Polish Rally Championship	(Poland) Marian Bublewicz	
Romanian Rally Championship	(Romania) Ștefan Vasile	
Scottish Rally Championship	(United Kingdom) Jimmy Girvan	
Scottish Rally Championship	Co-Drivers: (United Kingdom) Campbell Roy	
South African National Rally Championship	(South Africa) Glyn Hall	
South African National Rally Championship	Co-Drivers: (South Africa) Martin Botha	
South African National Rally Championship	Manufacturers: (Japan) Toyota	
Spanish Rally Championship	(Spain) Jesús Puras	
Spanish Rally Championship	Co-Drivers: (Spain) José Arrarte	

=== Rallycross ===
Series	Driver	Season article
FIA European Rallycross Championship	Div 1: (Sweden) Kenneth Hansen	
FIA European Rallycross Championship	Div 2: (Finland) Matti Alamäki	
British Rallycross Championship	(United Kingdom) Steve Palmer	

=== Ice racing ===
Series	Driver	Season article
Andros Trophy	(France) Eric Arpin	1990 Andros Trophy

== Sports car and GT ==
Series	Driver	Season article
World Sportscar Championship	(France) Jean-Louis Schlesser (Italy) Mauro Baldi	1990 World Sportscar Championship season
World Sportscar Championship	Teams: (Switzerland) Team Sauber Mercedes	1990 World Sportscar Championship season
IMSA GT Championship	GTP: (Australia) Geoff Brabham	1990 IMSA GT Championship season
IMSA GT Championship	Lights: (Mexico) Tomás López	1990 IMSA GT Championship season
IMSA GT Championship	GTO: (United States) Dorsey Schroeder	1990 IMSA GT Championship season
IMSA GT Championship	GTU: (United States) Lance Stewart	1990 IMSA GT Championship season
All Japan Sports Prototype Championship	(Japan) Masahiro Hasemi (Sweden) Anders Olofsson	
All Japan Sports Prototype Championship	Manufacturers: (Japan) Nissan	
Porsche Supercup, Porsche Carrera Cup, GT3 Cup Challenge and Porsche Sprint Challenge
Porsche Carrera Cup France	(France) Michel Maisonneuve	1990 Porsche Carrera Cup France
Porsche Carrera Cup Germany	(Germany) Olaf Manthey	1990 Porsche Carrera Cup Germany
Porsche Carrera Cup Germany	Teams: (Germany) Team Derkum	1990 Porsche Carrera Cup Germany

== Stock car racing ==
Series	Driver	Season article
NASCAR Winston Cup Series	(United States) Dale Earnhardt	1990 NASCAR Winston Cup Series
NASCAR Winston Cup Series	Manufacturers: (United States) Chevrolet	1990 NASCAR Winston Cup Series
NASCAR Busch Grand National Series	(United States) Chuck Bown	1990 NASCAR Busch Series
NASCAR Busch Grand National Series	Manufacturers: (United States) Buick	1990 NASCAR Busch Series
NASCAR Busch North Series	(United States) Jamie Aube	1990 NASCAR Busch North Series
NASCAR Winston West Series	(United States) Bill Schmitt	1990 NASCAR Winston West Series
ARCA Bondo/Mar-Hyde Series	(United States) Bob Brevak	1990 ARCA Bondo/Mar-Hyde Series
International Race of Champions	(United States) Dale Earnhardt	IROC XIV
AUSCAR	(Australia) Brad Jones	1989–90 AUSCAR season
Australian Super Speedway Championship	(Australia) Robin Best	1989–90 Australian Super Speedway Championship
Turismo Carretera	(Argentina) Emilio Satriano	1990 Turismo Carretera

== Touring car ==
Series	Driver	Season article
Australian Touring Car Championship	(New Zealand) Jim Richards	1990 Australian Touring Car Championship
Australian Endurance Championship	(Australia) Glenn Seton	1990 Australian Endurance Championship
British Touring Car Championship	(United Kingdom) Robb Gravett	1990 British Touring Car Championship season
Campeonato Brasileiro de Marcas e Pilotos	(Brazil) Andreas Mattheis (Brazil) Ricardo Cosac	1990 Campeonato Brasileiro de Marcas e Pilotos
Deutsche Tourenwagen Meisterschaft	(Germany) Hans-Joachim Stuck	1990 Deutsche Tourenwagen Meisterschaft
Europa Cup Renault 21 Turbo	(Italy) Massimo Sigala	1990 Europa Cup Renault 21 Turbo
French Supertouring Championship	(France) Jean-Pierre Malcher	
Italian Superturismo Championship	(Italy) Roberto Ravaglia	
Japanese Touring Car Championship	(Japan) Kazuyoshi Hoshino	1990 Japanese Touring Car Championship
Japanese Touring Car Championship	JTC-2: (Austria) Roland Ratzenberger	1990 Japanese Touring Car Championship
Japanese Touring Car Championship	JTC-3: (Japan) Keiichi Suzuki	1990 Japanese Touring Car Championship
New Zealand Touring Car Championship	(New Zealand) Robbie Francevic	
Stock Car Brasil	(Brazil) Ingo Hoffmann	1990 Stock Car Brasil season
TC2000 Championship	(Argentina) Juan María Traverso	1990 TC2000 Championship
TVR Tuscan Challenge	(United Kingdom) Chris Hodgetts	

== Truck racing ==
Series	Driver	Season article
European Truck Racing Championship	Class A: (Germany) Axel Hegmann	1990 European Truck Racing Championship
European Truck Racing Championship	Class B: (Sweden) Curt Göransson	1990 European Truck Racing Championship
European Truck Racing Championship	Class C: (United Kingdom) Steve Parrish	1990 European Truck Racing Championship

== See also ==
- List of motorsport championships
- Auto racing
