= List of 1988 motorsport champions =

1988 motorsport champions
Previous: 1987	Next: 1989

This list of 1988 motorsport champions is a list of national or international auto racing series with a Championship decided by the points or positions earned by a driver from multiple races.

== Dirt oval racing ==
Series	Champion	Refer
World of Outlaws Late Model Series	(United States) Billy Moyer Sr.	
World of Outlaws Sprint Car Series	(United States) Steve Kinser	
World of Outlaws Sprint Car Series	Teams: (United States) Karl Kinser Racing	

== Drag racing ==
Series	Champion	Refer
NHRA Winston Drag Racing Series	Top Fuel: (United States) Joe Amato	1988 NHRA Winston Drag Racing Series
NHRA Winston Drag Racing Series	Funny Car: (United States) Kenny Bernstein	1988 NHRA Winston Drag Racing Series
NHRA Winston Drag Racing Series	Pro Stock: (United States) Bob Glidden	1988 NHRA Winston Drag Racing Series
NHRA Winston Drag Racing Series	Pro Stock Motorcycle: (United States) Dave Schultz	1988 NHRA Winston Drag Racing Series

== Karting ==
Series	Driver	Season article
CIK-FIA Karting World Championship	FK: (United Kingdom) Mike Wilson	
CIK-FIA Karting World Championship	FS100: (France) Emmanuel Collard	
CIK-FIA Karting World Championship	FC: (Sweden) Peter Rydell	
CIK-FIA Junior World Cup	(Italy) Gianluca Malandrucco	
CIK-FIA Karting European Championship	FK: (Italy) Federico Gemmo	
CIK-FIA Karting European Championship	S100: (Denmark) Gert Munkholm	
CIK-FIA Karting European Championship	ICC: (Italy) Vincenzo Saitta	
CIK-FIA Karting European Championship	ICA: (Netherlands) Martijn Koene	
World Superkart Championship	(Denmark) Poul Petersen	

== Motorcycle racing ==
Series	Rider	Season article
500cc World Championship	(United States) Eddie Lawson	1988 Grand Prix motorcycle racing season
250cc World Championship	(Spain) Sito Pons	1988 Grand Prix motorcycle racing season
125cc World Championship	(Spain) Jorge Martínez	1988 Grand Prix motorcycle racing season
80cc World Championship	(Spain) Jorge Martínez	1988 Grand Prix motorcycle racing season
Superbike World Championship	(United States) Fred Merkel	1988 Superbike World Championship season
Speedway World Championship	(Denmark) Erik Gundersen	1988 Individual Speedway World Championship
AMA Superbike Championship	(United States) Bubba Shobert	
Australian Endurance Championship	(Australia) Rob Phillis	

== Open wheel racing ==
Series	Driver	Season article
FIA Formula One World Championship	(Brazil) Ayrton Senna	1988 Formula One World Championship
FIA Formula One World Championship	Constructors: (United Kingdom) McLaren-Honda	1988 Formula One World Championship
CART PPG Indy Car World Series	(United States) Danny Sullivan	1988 CART PPG Indy Car World Series
CART PPG Indy Car World Series	Manufacturers: (United States) Chevrolet	1988 CART PPG Indy Car World Series
CART PPG Indy Car World Series	Rookies: (Canada) John Jones	1988 CART PPG Indy Car World Series
American Racing Series	(United States) Jon Beekhuis	1988 American Racing Series season
International Formula 3000	(Brazil) Roberto Moreno	1988 International Formula 3000 season
All-Japan Formula 3000 Championship	(Japan) Aguri Suzuki	1988 Japanese Formula 3000 Championship
American Indycar Series	(United States) Buddy Lazier	1988 American Indycar Series
Australian Drivers' Championship	(Australia) Rohan Onslow	1988 Australian Drivers' Championship
Australian Formula 2 Championship	(Australia) Rohan Onslow	1988 Australian Formula 2 Championship
Barber Saab Pro Series	(United States) Bruce Feldman	1988 Barber Saab Pro Series
Cup of Peace and Friendship	(Soviet Union) Viktor Kozankov	1988 Cup of Peace and Friendship
Cup of Peace and Friendship	Nations: Soviet Union	1988 Cup of Peace and Friendship
Formula Atlantic East Coast	(United States) Steve Shelton	1988 Formula Atlantic East Coast season
Formula Atlantic West Coast	(United States) Dean Hall	1988 Formula Atlantic West Coast season
Formula König	(Germany) Michael Schumacher	1988 Formula König season
Formula König	Teams: (Germany) Hoecker Sportwagenservice	1988 Formula König season
SCCA Formula Super Vee	(United States) Ken Murillo	1988 SCCA Formula Super Vee season
Formula Three
All-Japan Formula Three Championship	(Japan) Akihiko Nakaya	1988 All-Japan Formula Three Championship
All-Japan Formula Three Championship	Teams: (Japan) Le Garage Cox Racing	1988 All-Japan Formula Three Championship
Austria Formula 3 Cup	(Austria) Karl Wendlinger	1988 Austria Formula 3 Cup
British Formula Three Championship	(Finland) JJ Lehto	1988 British Formula Three Championship
British Formula Three Championship	National: (United Kingdom) Alistair Lyall	1988 British Formula Three Championship
Chilean Formula Three Championship	(Chile) Giuseppe Bacigalupo	1988 Chilean Formula Three Championship
French Formula Three Championship	(France) Érik Comas	1988 French Formula Three Championship
French Formula Three Championship	Teams: (France) Oreca	1988 French Formula Three Championship
German Formula Three Championship	(Germany) Joachim Winkelhock	1988 German Formula Three Championship
German Formula Three Championship	B: (Switzerland) Daniel Müller	1988 German Formula Three Championship
Italian Formula Three Championship	(Italy) Emanuele Naspetti	1988 Italian Formula Three Championship
Italian Formula Three Championship	Teams: (Italy) Forti Corse	1988 Italian Formula Three Championship
Formula Three Sudamericana	(Argentina) Juan Carlos Giacchino	1988 Formula 3 Sudamericana
Swiss Formula Three Championship	(Switzerland) Jakob Bordoli	1988 Swiss Formula Three Championship
Formula Renault
French Formula Renault Championship	(France) Ludovic Faure	1988 French Formula Renault Championship
Formula Renault Argentina	(Argentina) Luis Belloso	1988 Formula Renault Argentina
Formula Ford
Australian Formula Ford Championship	(Australia) David Roberts	1988 Motorcraft Formula Ford Driver to Europe Series
Brazilian Formula Ford Championship	(Brazil) Djalma Fogaça	
British Formula Ford Championship	(Republic of Ireland) Derek Higgins	1988 British Formula Ford Championship
Danish Formula Ford Championship	(Denmark) Henrik Jacobsen	
Dutch Formula Ford 1600 Championship	(Netherlands) Frank Eglem	1988 Dutch Formula Ford 1600 Championship
Finnish Formula Ford Championship	(Finland) Mika Salo	
German Formula Ford Championship	(Germany) Meik Wagner	
New Zealand Formula Ford Championship	(New Zealand) Craig Baird	
Formula Ford 1600 Nordic Championship	(Finland) Mika Salo	
Portuguese Formula Ford Championship	(Portugal) Diogo Castro Santos	
Spanish Formula Ford Championship	(Spain) Jordi Gené	
Swedish Formula Ford Championship	(Sweden) Michael Johansson	
Formula Ford Sweden Junior	(Sweden) Peter Åslund	

== Rallying ==
Series	Driver/Co-Driver	Season article
World Rally Championship	(Italy) Miki Biasion	1988 World Rally Championship
World Rally Championship	Co-Drivers: (Italy) Tiziano Siviero	1988 World Rally Championship
World Rally Championship	Manufacturer: (Italy) Lancia	1988 World Rally Championship
FIA Cup for Production Cars	(Belgium) Pascal Gaban (Belgium) Willy Lux	1988 World Rally Championship
African Rally Championship	(Zambia) Satwant Singh	1988 African Rally Championship
Asia-Pacific Rally Championship	(Japan) Kenjiro Shinozuka	1988 Asia-Pacific Rally Championship
Asia-Pacific Rally Championship	Co-Drivers: (Lithuania) Fred Gocentas	1988 Asia-Pacific Rally Championship
Australian Rally Championship	(Australia) Murray Coote	1988 Australian Rally Championship
Australian Rally Championship	Co-Drivers: (Australia) Iain Stewart	1988 Australian Rally Championship
British Rally Championship	(United Kingdom) Jimmy McRae	1988 British Rally Championship
British Rally Championship	Co-Drivers: (United Kingdom) Rob Arthur	1988 British Rally Championship
Canadian Rally Championship	(Canada) Alain Bergeron	1988 Canadian Rally Championship
Canadian Rally Championship	Co-Drivers: (Canada) Raymond Cadieux	1988 Canadian Rally Championship
Deutsche Rallye Meisterschaft	(Germany) Armin Schwarz	
Estonian Rally Championship	(Estonian Soviet Socialist Republic) Aare Klooren	1988 Estonian Rally Championship
Estonian Rally Championship	Co-Drivers: (Estonian Soviet Socialist Republic) Toomas Kreek	1988 Estonian Rally Championship
European Rally Championship	(Italy) Fabrizio Tabaton	1988 European Rally Championship
European Rally Championship	Co-Drivers: (Italy) Luciano Tedeschini	1988 European Rally Championship
Finnish Rally Championship	Group A: (Finland) Mikael Sundström	1988 Finnish Rally Championship
Finnish Rally Championship	Group 2: (Finland) Tommi Mäkinen	1988 Finnish Rally Championship
Finnish Rally Championship	Group B: (Finland) Petteri Lindström	1988 Finnish Rally Championship
French Rally Championship	(France) Didier Auriol	
Hungarian Rally Championship	(Hungary) László Ranga	
Hungarian Rally Championship	Co-Drivers: (Hungary) Mihály Dudás	
Indian National Rally Championship	(India) Farad Bathena	
Indian National Rally Championship	Co-Drivers: (India) Raj Bagri	
Italian Rally Championship	(Italy) Dario Cerrato	
Italian Rally Championship	Co-Drivers: (Italy) Giuseppe Cerri	
Italian Rally Championship	Manufacturers: (Italy) Lancia	
Middle East Rally Championship	(United Arab Emirates) Mohammed Ben Sulayem	
New Zealand Rally Championship	(New Zealand) Brian Stokes	1988 New Zealand Rally Championship
New Zealand Rally Championship	Co-Drivers: (New Zealand) Robert Haldane	1988 New Zealand Rally Championship
Polish Rally Championship	(Poland) Andrzej Koper	
Romanian Rally Championship	(Romania) Ștefan Vasile	
Scottish Rally Championship	(United Kingdom) Colin McRae	
Scottish Rally Championship	Co-Drivers: (United Kingdom) Derek Ringer	
South African National Rally Championship	(South Africa) Sarel van der Merwe	
South African National Rally Championship	Co-Drivers: (South Africa) Franz Boshoff	
South African National Rally Championship	Manufacturers: (Germany) Volkswagen	
Spanish Rally Championship	(Spain) Carlos Sainz	
Spanish Rally Championship	Co-Drivers: (Spain) Luis Moya	

=== Rallycross ===
Series	Driver	Season article
FIA European Rallycross Championship	Div 1: (Norway) Bjørn Skogstad	
FIA European Rallycross Championship	Div 2: (Finland) Matti Alamäki	
British Rallycross Championship	(United Kingdom) Mark Rennison	

== Sports car and GT ==
Series	Driver	Season article
World Sports Prototype Championship	C1: (United Kingdom) Martin Brundle	1988 World Sportscar Championship season
World Sports Prototype Championship	C1 Teams: (United Kingdom) Silk Cut Jaguar	1988 World Sportscar Championship season
World Sports Prototype Championship	C2: (United Kingdom) Gordon Spice; C2: (United Kingdom) Ray Bellm	1988 World Sportscar Championship season
World Sports Prototype Championship	C2 Teams: (United Kingdom) Spice Engineering	1988 World Sportscar Championship season
IMSA GT Championship	GTP: (Australia) Geoff Brabham	1988 IMSA GT Championship season
IMSA GT Championship	Lights: (United States) Tom Hessert	1988 IMSA GT Championship season
IMSA GT Championship	GTO: (United States) Scott Pruett	1988 IMSA GT Championship season
IMSA GT Championship	GTU: (United States) Tommy Kendall	1988 IMSA GT Championship season
ADAC Supercup	(France) Jean-Louis Schlesser	1988 ADAC Supercup
ADAC Supercup	Teams: (Germany) Blaupunkt Joest Racing	1988 ADAC Supercup
Australian Sports Car Championship	(Australia) Alan Nolan	1988 Australian Sports Car Championship
Porsche Supercup, Porsche Carrera Cup, GT3 Cup Challenge and Porsche Sprint Challenge
Porsche Carrera Cup France	(France) André Bourdon	1988 Porsche Carrera Cup France
Porsche 944 Turbo Cup	(Germany) Roland Asch	1988 Porsche 944 Turbo Cup
Porsche 944 Turbo Cup	Teams: (Germany) Strähle Autosport	1988 Porsche 944 Turbo Cup

== Stock car ==
Series	Driver	Season article
NASCAR Winston Cup Series	(United States) Bill Elliott	1988 NASCAR Winston Cup Series
NASCAR Winston Cup Series	Manufacturers: (United States) Chevrolet	1988 NASCAR Winston Cup Series
NASCAR Busch Grand National Series	(United States) Tommy Ellis	1988 NASCAR Busch Series
NASCAR Busch Grand National Series	Manufacturers: (United States) Buick	1988 NASCAR Busch Series
NASCAR Busch North Series	(United States) Jamie Aube	1988 NASCAR Busch North Series
NASCAR Winston West Series	(United States) Roy Smith	1988 NASCAR Winston West Series
ARCA Bondo/Mar-Hyde Series	(United States) Tracy Leslie	1988 ARCA Bondo/Mar-Hyde Series
International Race of Champions	(United States) Al Unser Jr.	IROC XII
AUSCAR	(Australia) Tony Kavich	1988 AUSCAR season
Turismo Carretera	(Argentina) Oscar Castellano	1988 Turismo Carretera

== Touring car ==
Series	Driver	Season article
European Touring Car Championship	(Italy) Roberto Ravaglia	
Asia-Pacific Touring Car Championship	(New Zealand) Trevor Crowe	1988 Asia-Pacific Touring Car Championship
Australian Touring Car Championship	(Australia) Dick Johnson	1988 Australian Touring Car Championship
British Touring Car Championship	(United Kingdom) Frank Sytner	1988 British Touring Car Championship
Campeonato Brasileiro de Marcas e Pilotos	(Brazil) Andreas Mattheis	1988 Campeonato Brasileiro de Marcas e Pilotos
Deutsche Tourenwagen Meisterschaft	(Germany) Klaus Ludwig	1988 Deutsche Tourenwagen Meisterschaft
Europa Cup Renault Alpine V6 Turbo	(Italy) Massimo Sigala	1988 Europa Cup Renault Alpine V6 Turbo
French Supertouring Championship	(France) Jean Ragnotti	
Italian Superturismo Championship	(Italy) Gianfranco Brancatelli	
Japanese Touring Car Championship	(Japan) Hisashi Yokoshima	1988 Japanese Touring Car Championship
Japanese Touring Car Championship	JTC-2: (Japan) Haruto Yanagida	1988 Japanese Touring Car Championship
Japanese Touring Car Championship	JTC-3: (Japan) Osamu Nakako	1988 Japanese Touring Car Championship
New Zealand Touring Car Championship	(New Zealand) Trevor Crowe	
Stock Car Brasil	(Brazil) Fábio Sotto Mayor	1988 Stock Car Brasil season
TC2000 Championship	(Argentina) Juan María Traverso	1988 TC2000 Championship

== Truck racing ==
Series	Driver	Season article
European Truck Racing Championship	Class A: (France) Gérard Cuynet	1988 European Truck Racing Championship
European Truck Racing Championship	Class B: (Sweden) Curt Göransson	1988 European Truck Racing Championship
European Truck Racing Championship	Class C: (Sweden) Rolf Björk	1988 European Truck Racing Championship

== See also ==
- List of motorsport championships
- Auto racing
