= List of 1989 motorsport champions =

1989 motorsport champions
Previous: 1988	Next: 1990

This list of 1989 motorsport champions is a list of national or international auto racing series with a Championship decided by the points or positions earned by a driver from multiple races.

== Dirt oval racing ==
Series	Champion	Refer
World of Outlaws Late Model Series	(United States) Billy Moyer Sr.	
World of Outlaws Sprint Car Series	(United States) Bobby Davis Jr.	
World of Outlaws Sprint Car Series	Teams: (United States) Casey Luna Ford Racing	

== Drag racing ==
Series	Champion	Refer
NHRA Winston Drag Racing Series	Top Fuel: (United States) Gary Ormsby	1989 NHRA Winston Drag Racing Series
NHRA Winston Drag Racing Series	Funny Car: (United States) Bruce Larson	1989 NHRA Winston Drag Racing Series
NHRA Winston Drag Racing Series	Pro Stock: (United States) Bob Glidden	1989 NHRA Winston Drag Racing Series
NHRA Winston Drag Racing Series	Pro Stock Motorcycle: (United States) John Mafaro	1989 NHRA Winston Drag Racing Series

== Karting ==
Series	Driver	Season article
CIK-FIA Karting World Championship	FK: (United Kingdom) Mike Wilson	
CIK-FIA Karting World Championship	FS100: (Danish Realm) Gert Munkholm	
CIK-FIA Karting World Championship	FC: (Italy) Gianluca Giorgi	
CIK-FIA Junior World Cup	(Denmark) Jan Magnussen	
CIK-FIA Karting European Championship	FK: (Belgium) Marc Goossens	
CIK-FIA Karting European Championship	S100: (Netherlands) Jos Verstappen	
CIK-FIA Karting European Championship	ICC: (Italy) Gianluca Paglicci	
CIK-FIA Karting European Championship	ICA: (Netherlands) Jos Verstappen	
CIK-FIA Karting European Championship	ICA-J: (Italy) Gianluca Malandrucco	
World Superkart Championship	(United Kingdom) Tim Parrott	

== Motorcycle racing ==
Series	Rider	Season article
500cc World Championship	(United States) Eddie Lawson	1989 Grand Prix motorcycle racing season
250cc World Championship	(Spain) Sito Pons	1989 Grand Prix motorcycle racing season
125cc World Championship	(Spain) Àlex Crivillé	1989 Grand Prix motorcycle racing season
80cc World Championship	(Spain) Manuel Herreros	1989 Grand Prix motorcycle racing season
Superbike World Championship	(United States) Fred Merkel	1989 Superbike World Championship season
Speedway World Championship	(Denmark) Hans Nielsen	1989 Individual Speedway World Championship
AMA Superbike Championship	(United States) Jamie James	
Australian Superbike Championship	(Australia) Malcolm Campbell	

== Open wheel racing ==
Series	Driver	Season article
FIA Formula One World Championship	(France) Alain Prost	1989 Formula One World Championship
FIA Formula One World Championship	Constructors: (United Kingdom) McLaren-Honda	1989 Formula One World Championship
CART PPG Indy Car World Series	(Brazil) Emerson Fittipaldi	1989 CART PPG Indy Car World Series
CART PPG Indy Car World Series	Manufacturers: (United States) Chevrolet	1989 CART PPG Indy Car World Series
CART PPG Indy Car World Series	Rookies: (Mexico) Bernard Jourdain	1989 CART PPG Indy Car World Series
American Racing Series	(United States) Mike Groff	1989 American Racing Series season
International Formula 3000	(France) Jean Alesi	1989 International Formula 3000 season
British Formula 3000	(Australia) Gary Brabham	1989 British Formula 3000 Championship
All-Japan Formula 3000 Championship	(Japan) Hitoshi Ogawa	1989 Japanese Formula 3000 Championship
American Indycar Series	(United States) Robby Unser	1989 American Indycar Series
Toyota Atlantic East Coast Championship	(United States) Jocko Cunningham	1989 Toyota Atlantic East Coast Championship
Toyota Atlantic West Coast Championship	(Japan) Hiro Matsushita	1989 Toyota Atlantic West Coast Championship
Australian Drivers' Championship	(Australia) Rohan Onslow	1989 Australian Drivers' Championship
Barber Saab Pro Series	(United States) Robbie Buhl	
Cup of Peace and Friendship	(Soviet Union) Viktor Kozankov	1989 Cup of Peace and Friendship
Cup of Peace and Friendship	Nations: Soviet Union	1989 Cup of Peace and Friendship
Formula Fiat	(Spain) Pedro de la Rosa	
Formula König	(Germany) Thomas Winkelhock	1989 Formula König season
Formula König	Teams: (Germany) König Motorsport	1989 Formula König season
SCCA Formula Super Vee	(United States) Mark Smith	1989 SCCA Formula Super Vee season
Formula Three
All-Japan Formula Three Championship	(Japan) Masahiko Kageyama	1989 All-Japan Formula Three Championship
All-Japan Formula Three Championship	Teams: (Japan) Leyton House Racing	1989 All-Japan Formula Three Championship
Austria Formula 3 Cup	(Austria) Josef Neuhauser	1989 Austria Formula 3 Cup
Brazilian Formula Three Championship	(Brazil) Christian Fittipaldi	1989 Brazilian Formula Three Championship
Brazilian Formula Three Championship	Teams: (Brazil) Fittipaldi Competicion	1989 Brazilian Formula Three Championship
British Formula Three Championship	(Australia) David Brabham	1988 British Formula Three Championship
British Formula Three Championship	National: (Mexico) Fernando Plata	1988 British Formula Three Championship
Chilean Formula Three Championship	(Chile) Santiago Bengolea	1989 Chilean Formula Three Championship
French Formula Three Championship	(France) Jean-Marc Gounon	1989 French Formula Three Championship
French Formula Three Championship	Teams: (France) Oreca	1989 French Formula Three Championship
German Formula Three Championship	(Austria) Karl Wendlinger	1989 German Formula Three Championship
German Formula Three Championship	B: (Germany) Franz Engstler	1989 German Formula Three Championship
Italian Formula Three Championship	(Italy) Gianni Morbidelli	1989 Italian Formula Three Championship
Italian Formula Three Championship	Teams: (Italy) Forti Corse	1989 Italian Formula Three Championship
Formula Three Sudamericana	(Argentina) Gabriel Furlán	1989 Formula 3 Sudamericana
Swiss Formula Three Championship	(Switzerland) Jacques Isler	1989 Swiss Formula Three Championship
Formula Renault
French Formula Renault Championship	(France) Olivier Panis	1989 French Formula Renault Championship
Formula Renault Sport UK	(United Kingdom) Neil Riddiford	1989 Formula Renault Sport UK
Formula Renault Argentina	(Argentina) Sergio Solmi	1989 Formula Renault Argentina
Formula Ford
Australian Formula Ford Championship	(Australia) Mark Larkham	1989 Motorcraft Formula Ford Driver to Europe Series
Brazilian Formula Ford Championship	(Brazil) Tom Stefani	
British Formula Ford Championship	(Republic of Ireland) Bernard Dolan	1989 British Formula Ford Championship
Danish Formula Ford Championship	(Denmark) Carl Bjarne Pedersen	
Finnish Formula Ford Championship	(Finland) Pekka Herva	
German Formula Ford Championship	(Germany) Michael Krumm	
Formula Ford 2000 Canada	(Canada) Claude Bourbonnais	
Autosport Formula Ford 1600	(United Kingdom) David Coulthard	
P&O Ferries Formula Ford 1600	(United Kingdom) David Coulthard	
Formula Ford 1600 Netherlands	(Netherlands) Marcel Albers	
New Zealand Formula Ford Championship	(New Zealand) Grant Campbell	
Formula Ford 1600 Nordic Championship	(Finland) Marko Mankonen	
Portuguese Formula Ford Championship	(Portugal) Pedro Lamy	
Spanish Formula Ford Championship	(Spain) Víctor López	
Swedish Formula Ford Championship	(Sweden) Jan Nilsson	

== Rallying ==
Series	Driver/Co-Driver	Season article
World Rally Championship	(Italy) Miki Biasion	1989 World Rally Championship
World Rally Championship	Co-Drivers: (Italy) Tiziano Siviero	1989 World Rally Championship
World Rally Championship	Manufacturer: (Italy) Lancia	1989 World Rally Championship
FIA Cup for Production Cars	(France) Alain Oreille (France) Gilles Thimonier	1989 World Rally Championship
African Rally Championship	(Zambia) Satwant Singh	1989 African Rally Championship
Asia-Pacific Rally Championship	(New Zealand) Rod Millen	1989 Asia-Pacific Rally Championship
Asia-Pacific Rally Championship	Co-Drivers: (New Zealand) Tony Sircombe	1989 Asia-Pacific Rally Championship
Australian Rally Championship	(Australia) Greg Carr	1989 Australian Rally Championship
Australian Rally Championship	Co-Drivers: (Australia) Mick Harker	1989 Australian Rally Championship
British Rally Championship	(United Kingdom) David Llewellin	1989 British Rally Championship
British Rally Championship	Co-Drivers: (United Kingdom) Phil Short	1989 British Rally Championship
Canadian Rally Championship	(Canada) Paul Choiniere	1989 Canadian Rally Championship
Canadian Rally Championship	Co-Drivers: (Canada) Martin Headland	1989 Canadian Rally Championship
Deutsche Rallye Meisterschaft	(Austria) Sepp Haider	
Estonian Rally Championship	(Estonian Soviet Socialist Republic) Ilmar Raissar	1989 Estonian Rally Championship
Estonian Rally Championship	Co-Drivers: (Estonian Soviet Socialist Republic) Rein Talvar	1989 Estonian Rally Championship
European Rally Championship	(France) Yves Loubet	1989 European Rally Championship
European Rally Championship	Co-Drivers: (France) Jean-Marc Andrié	1989 European Rally Championship
Finnish Rally Championship	Group A +2000cc: (Finland) Mikael Sundström	1989 Finnish Rally Championship
Finnish Rally Championship	Group N +2000cc: (Finland) Timo Kuivinen	1989 Finnish Rally Championship
Finnish Rally Championship	Group A -2000cc: (Finland) Teemu Tahko	1989 Finnish Rally Championship
Finnish Rally Championship	Group N -2000cc: (Finland) Petri Kaura	1989 Finnish Rally Championship
French Rally Championship	(France) François Chatriot	
Hungarian Rally Championship	(Hungary) György Selmeczi	
Hungarian Rally Championship	Co-Drivers: (Hungary) József Jutassy	
Indian National Rally Championship	(India) Farad Bathena	
Indian National Rally Championship	Co-Drivers: (India) Raj Bagri	
Italian Rally Championship	(Italy) Dario Cerrato	
Italian Rally Championship	Co-Drivers: (Italy) Giuseppe Cerri	
Italian Rally Championship	Manufacturers: (Italy) Lancia	
Middle East Rally Championship	(United Arab Emirates) Mohammed Ben Sulayem	
New Zealand Rally Championship	(New Zealand) Neil Allport	1989 New Zealand Rally Championship
New Zealand Rally Championship	Co-Drivers: (New Zealand) Robert Haldane	1989 New Zealand Rally Championship
Polish Rally Championship	(Poland) Marian Bublewicz	
Romanian Rally Championship	(Romania) Ludovic Balint	
Scottish Rally Championship	(United Kingdom) Andrew Wood	
Scottish Rally Championship	Co-Drivers: (United Kingdom) Campbell Roy	
South African National Rally Championship	(Belgium) Serge Damseaux	
South African National Rally Championship	Co-Drivers: (South Africa) Vito Bonafede	
South African National Rally Championship	Manufacturers: (Japan) Toyota	
Spanish Rally Championship	(Spain) Pep Basas	
Spanish Rally Championship	Co-Drivers: (Spain) Antonio Rodríguez	

=== Rallycross ===
Series	Driver	Season article
FIA European Rallycross Championship	Div 1: (Sweden) Kenneth Hansen	
FIA European Rallycross Championship	Div 2: (Finland) Matti Alamäki	
British Rallycross Championship	(United Kingdom) Michael Shield	

== Sports car and GT ==
Series	Driver	Season article
World Sportscar Championship	C1: (France) Jean-Louis Schlesser	1989 World Sportscar Championship season
World Sportscar Championship	C1 Teams: (Switzerland) Team Sauber Mercedes	1989 World Sportscar Championship season
World Sportscar Championship	C2: (Spain) Fermín Velez; C2: (United Kingdom) Nick Adams	1989 World Sportscar Championship season
World Sportscar Championship	Teams: (United Kingdom) Chamberlain Engineering	1989 World Sportscar Championship season
All Japan Sports Prototype Championship	(Sweden) Stanley Dickens (Japan) Kunimitsu Takahashi	
All Japan Sports Prototype Championship	Manufacturers: (Germany) Porsche	
IMSA GT Championship	GTP: (Australia) Geoff Brabham	1989 IMSA GT Championship season
IMSA GT Championship	Lights: (United States) Scott Schubot	1989 IMSA GT Championship season
IMSA GT Championship	GTO: (United States) Pete Halsmer	1989 IMSA GT Championship season
IMSA GT Championship	GTU: (United States) Bob Leitzinger	1989 IMSA GT Championship season
ADAC Supercup	(France) Bob Wollek	1989 ADAC Supercup
ADAC Supercup	Teams: (Germany) Blaupunkt Joest Racing	1989 ADAC Supercup
Porsche Supercup, Porsche Carrera Cup, GT3 Cup Challenge and Porsche Sprint Challenge
Porsche Carrera Cup France	(France) Michel Maisonneuve	1989 Porsche Carrera Cup France
Porsche 944 Turbo Cup	(Germany) Roland Asch	1989 Porsche 944 Turbo Cup
Porsche 944 Turbo Cup	Teams: (Germany) Strähle Autosport	1989 Porsche 944 Turbo Cup

== Stock car racing ==
Series	Driver	Season article
NASCAR Winston Cup Series	(United States) Rusty Wallace	1989 NASCAR Winston Cup Series
NASCAR Winston Cup Series	Manufacturers: (United States) Chevrolet	1989 NASCAR Winston Cup Series
NASCAR Busch Grand National Series	(United States) Rob Moroso	1989 NASCAR Busch Series
NASCAR Busch Grand National Series	Manufacturers: (United States) Buick	1989 NASCAR Busch Series
NASCAR Busch North Series	(United States) Jamie Aube	1989 NASCAR Busch North Series
NASCAR Winston West Series	(United States) Bill Schmitt	1989 NASCAR Winston West Series
ARCA Bondo/Mar-Hyde Series	(United States) Bob Keselowski	1989 ARCA Bondo/Mar-Hyde Series
International Race of Champions	(United States) Terry Labonte	IROC XIII
Turismo Carretera	(Argentina) Oscar Castellano	1989 Turismo Carretera

== Touring car ==
Series	Driver	Season article
Australian Touring Car Championship	(Australia) Dick Johnson	1989 Australian Touring Car Championship
British Touring Car Championship	(United Kingdom) John Cleland	
Campeonato Brasileiro de Marcas e Pilotos	(Brazil) Antonio da Matta (Brazil) Gunnar Volmer	1989 Campeonato Brasileiro de Marcas e Pilotos
Deutsche Tourenwagen Meisterschaft	(Italy) Roberto Ravaglia	1989 Deutsche Tourenwagen Meisterschaft
Europa Cup Renault 21 Turbo	(Italy) Massimo Sigala	1989 Europa Cup Renault 21 Turbo
French Supertouring Championship	(France) Jean-Pierre Malcher	
Italian Touring Car Championship	(Venezuela) Johnny Cecotto	
Japanese Touring Car Championship	(Japan) Masahiro Hasemi	1989 Japanese Touring Car Championship
Japanese Touring Car Championship	JTC-2: (Japan) Kenji Takahashi	1989 Japanese Touring Car Championship
Japanese Touring Car Championship	JTC-3: (Japan) Kazuo Mogi	1989 Japanese Touring Car Championship
New Zealand Touring Car Championship	(New Zealand) Robbie Francevic	
Stock Car Brasil	(Brazil) Ingo Hoffmann	1989 Stock Car Brasil season
TC2000 Championship	(Argentina) Miguel Ángel Guerra	1989 TC2000 Championship

== Truck racing ==
Series	Driver	Season article
European Truck Racing Championship	Class A: (United Kingdom) Rod Chapman	1989 European Truck Racing Championship
European Truck Racing Championship	Class B: (Sweden) Curt Göransson	1989 European Truck Racing Championship
European Truck Racing Championship	Class C: (Germany) Thomas Hegmann	1989 European Truck Racing Championship

== See also ==
- List of motorsport championships
- Auto racing
