= Beata Bublewicz =

Polish politician (born 1975)

Member of the Sejm
- In office 25 September 2005 – 2015
- Constituency: 35 – Olsztyn

Personal details
- Born: 26 February 1975 (age 51) Olsztyn
- Party: Civic Platform
- Relations: Marian Bublewicz (father)

Beata Maria Bublewicz (born 26 February 1975 in Olsztyn) is a Polish politician. She was elected to Sejm on 25 September 2005 getting 5,198 votes in 35 – Olsztyn for Civic Platform.

She is the daughter of late rally driver Marian Bublewicz.

== See also ==
- Members of Polish Sejm 2005-2007
