= Autopolis =

International racing circuit in Japan

Autopolis International Racing Course
- Full Circuit (1990–present)
- Location: Kamitsue, Hita City, Ōita Prefecture, Japan
- Coordinates: 33°2′13″N 130°58′22.9″E
- Capacity: 50,000
- FIA Grade: 2
- Owner: Kawasaki Motors (2005–present); Hazama Ando (1995–2004); Tomonori Tsurumaki (1990–1994)
- Operator: Autopolis Co., Ltd.
- Opened: November 1990; 36 years ago
- Construction cost: ¥47 billion
- Architect: Yoshitoshi Sakurai
- Major events: Current: Super GT (1999, 2003–2009, 2011–2015, 2017–2019, 2021–present); Super Formula (1991–1992, 2006, 2009–present); Super Taikyu (2012–present); MFJ Superbike (2002–2015, 2017–present); Future: Ferrari Challenge Japan (2023, 2025, 2027); Former: TCR Japan (2019–2021); FR Japan (2020); Asia Road Racing Championship (2009–2014); Formula V6 Asia (2007); Asian Touring Car Series (2003–2005, 2007); World Sportscar Championship (1991)
- Website: autopolis.jp

Full Circuit (1990–present)
- Length: 4.673 km (2.904 mi)
- Turns: 19
- Race lap record: 1:26.960 ( (Japan) Naoki Yamamoto, Dallara SF19, 2020, Super Formula)

Short Circuit (1990–present)
- Length: 3.022 km (1.878 mi)
- Turns: 12

Autopolis (オートポリス, Ōtoporisu) is a 4.673 km (2.904 mi) international racing circuit located near Kamitsue village in Ōita Prefecture, Japan on the 30 km (19 mi) northeast of Kumamoto. Opened in 1990, it hosts a range of domestic and international motorsport events throughout the year. The track is noted to have a high standard of facilities and infrastructure. Due to the circuit ending up in financial difficulties, it has changed hands several times but still operates to this day.

== History ==
The circuit, located within Aso Kujū National Park, was built at a cost of $500 million by the wealthy real-estate developer and investment banker Tomonori Tsurumaki who made headlines in 1989, when during a Paris auction, he successfully bid a Pablo Picasso painting Les Noces de Pierrette for $51.3 million from his Tokyo hotel room. Following his successful bid, he announced that his painting was to hang at the art gallery of the auto racing resort, under development at the time.

The circuit was designed by Yoshitoshi Sakurai who was the project leader of the Honda F1 team during the 1960s.

Tsurumaki ordered 30 Buick powered US built single seater race cars called "Sabre Cars" for a race to take place on his circuit's grand opening, in November 1990 consisting of a mixture of invited US CART drivers such as Stan Fox, Johnny Rutherford, Dick Simon, Gary and Tony Bettenhausen, against local Japanese drivers. After the grand opening, Tsurumaki planned on a series with the cars, known as Formula Crane 45. A few races were run in 1991, with only a handful of cars competing.

The only major international race held at Autopolis was the final race of the 1991 World Sportscar Championship season, the 1991 430km of Autopolis, which was won by Michael Schumacher and Karl Wendlinger in a Mercedes-Benz C291 fielded by Sauber.

To promote the venue's intention to host a Formula One race, it sponsored the Benetton Formula One team in 1990 and 1991. The cars featured prominent Autopolis logos. Visitors to the WSC event criticized the track for being too remote to the hotels which required a several hour bus ride and felt that it was unsuitable for a Formula One race.

Following the bankruptcy and collapse of Tsurumaki's company Nippon Tri-Trust in 1993 (the year the track was supposed to hold an F1 race), the circuit and other assets he owned ended up in the hands of Hazama who was responsible for the construction of the race track. Ultimately, the track's F1 event slot for the Asian GP on 11 April 1993 was given to Donington Park, and TI Circuit Aida would host a second Japanese race in Formula One calendar in 1994, but suffered from the same location-related criticism and was removed at the end of the following season.

By 1995, the company offered the site for sale at 10% of its build cost which consisted of three hotels, swimming pools and an artificial ski slope. Some of Tsurumaki's assets, such as paintings, remained in a bank vault waiting to be sold.

Autopolis first hosted a Super GT race in 1999, the season-ending exhibition race, which was won by Tom Coronel and Hidetoshi Mitsusada in a Honda NSX-GT fielded by Nakajima Racing. After a three-year absence, the circuit has regularly been hosting races in the series since 2003, although with some exceptions. Autopolis first held a Super Formula race in 2006, and with some exceptions, the track has regularly been part of the series since then.

Autopolis was purchased by Kawasaki Motors in 2005.

The circuit currently holds events for the Super GT as well as D1 Grand Prix, Super Formula, MFJ Superbike and Super Taikyu.

In March 2019, the circuit was added to the video game Gran Turismo Sport through a game update. It has also been featured in D1 Grand Prix, Need for Speed: ProStreet, Need for Speed: Shift, Shift 2: Unleashed, and Gran Turismo 7.

== The circuit ==
The circuit is located in an upland area of the island which means the air is thin with low atmospheric pressure, similar to Autódromo Hermanos Rodríguez in Mexico City. It has an elevation change of over 50 m (160 ft) with the first section generally downhill and the latter part of the course runs uphill. The start/finish straight is located at an altitude of 820 m (2,690 ft).

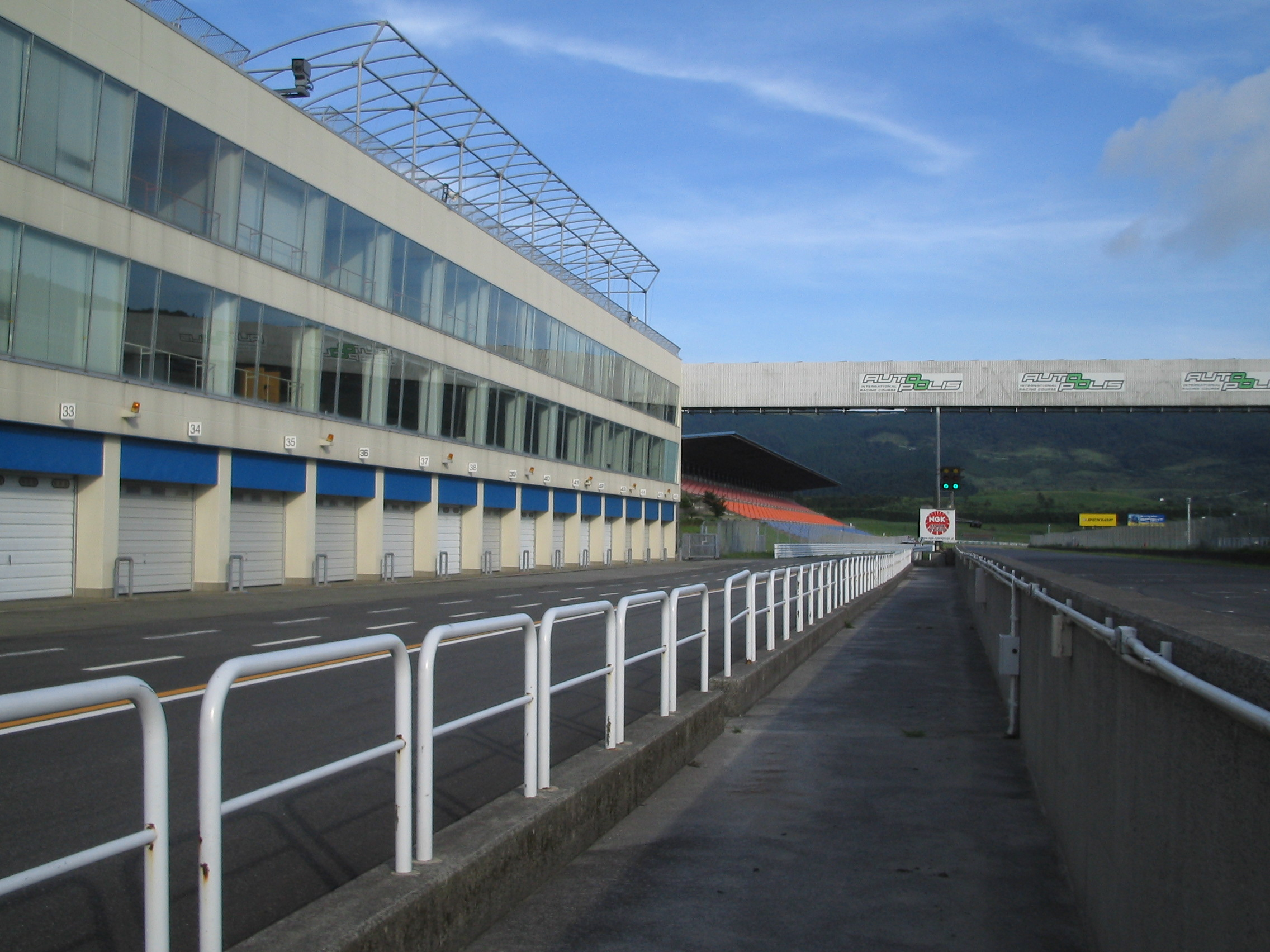
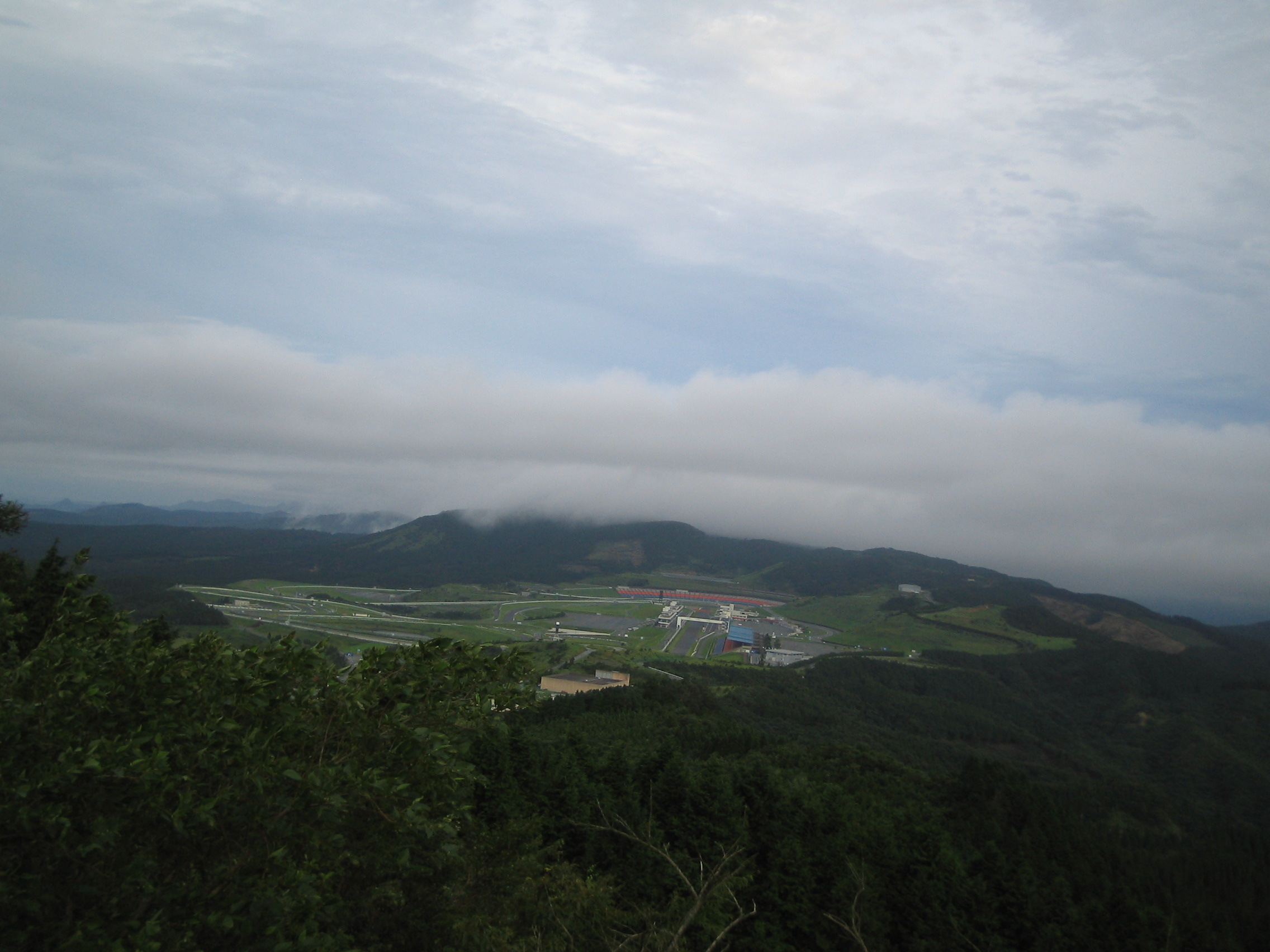
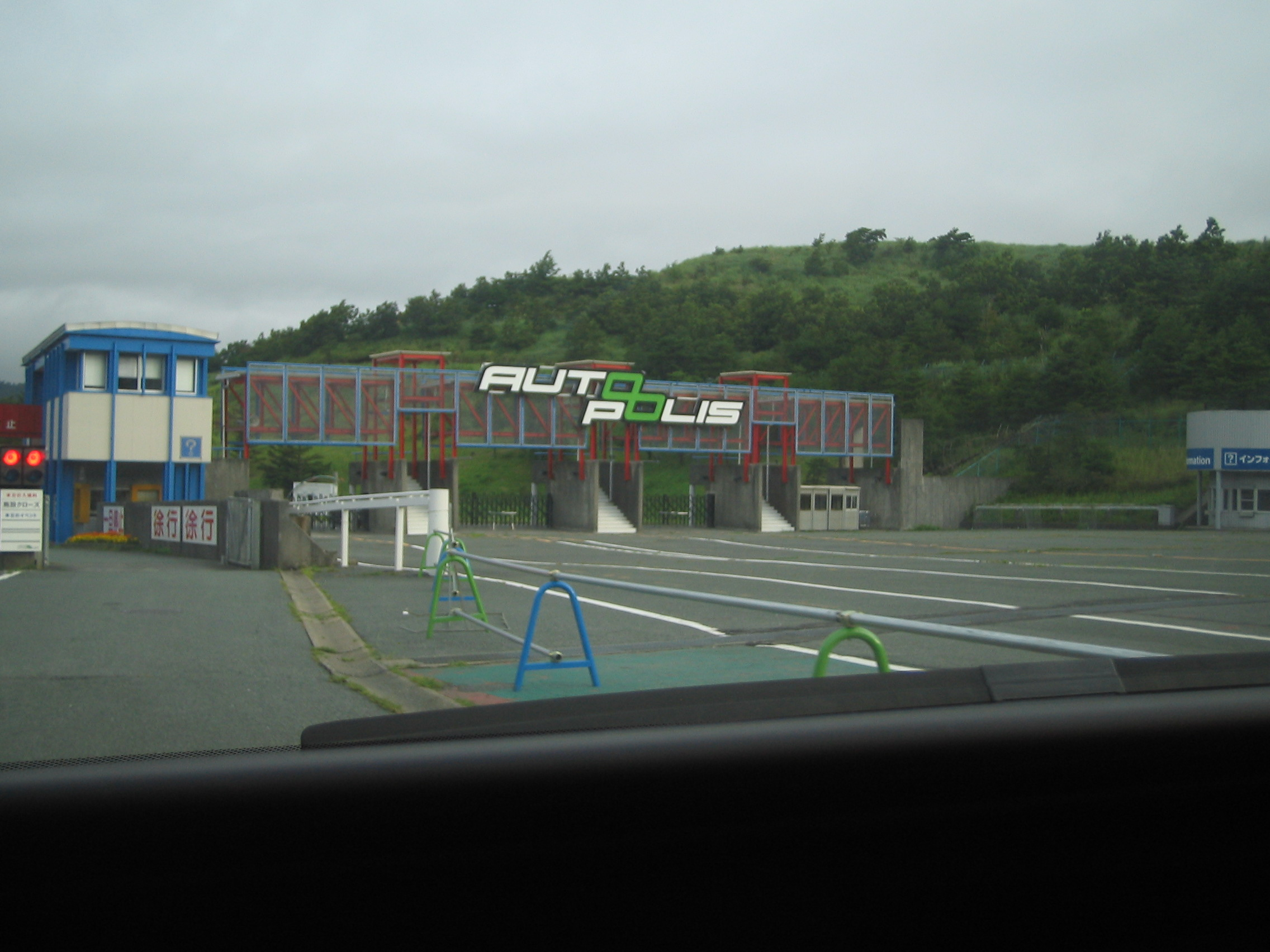
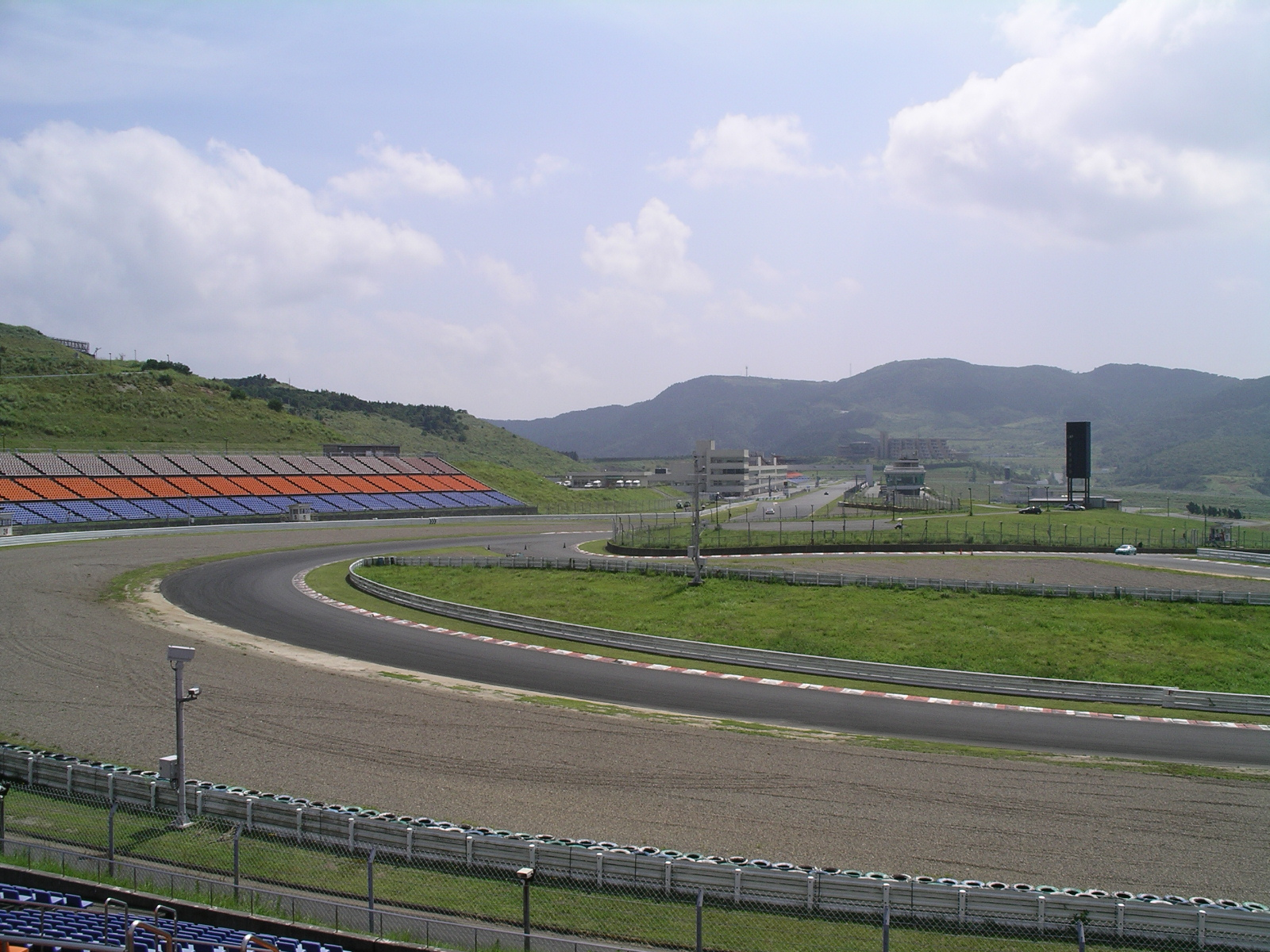

== Events ==
Current

- April: Super Formula Championship, Super Formula Lights
- May: MFJ Superbikes
- July: Super Taikyu
- October: Super GT, F4 Japanese Championship, D1 Grand Prix

Future

- Ferrari Challenge Japan (2023, 2025, 2027)

Former

- Asia Road Racing Championship (2009–2014)
- Asian Touring Car Series (2003–2005, 2007)
- Formula BMW Asia (2004–2005)
- Formula Crane 45 (1991–1992)
- Formula Regional Japanese Championship (2020)
- Formula V6 Asia (2007)
- Japanese Touring Car Championship (1991–1994)
- TCR Japan Touring Car Series (2019–2021)
- World Sportscar Championship
  - 430 km of Autopolis (1991)

== Lap records ==
As of May 2026, the fastest official race lap records at the Autopolis are listed as:

Category	Time	Driver	Vehicle	Event
Grand Prix Circuit (1990–present): 4.673 km (2.904 mi)
Super Formula	1:26.960	Naoki Yamamoto	Dallara SF19	2020 Autopolis Super Formula round
Formula Nippon	1:29.994	Hironobu Yasuda	Swift FN09	2012 Autopolis Formula Nippon round
Group C	1:30.615	Yannick Dalmas	Peugeot 905 Evo 1 Bis	1991 430 km of Autopolis
Formula 3000	1:34.225	Mauro Martini	Lola T92/50	1992 Autopolis Japanese F3000 round
Super GT (GT500)	1:34.829	Kenta Yamashita	Toyota GR Supra GT500	2021 Autopolis GT 300km Race
Super Formula Lights	1:37.114	Sena Sakaguchi	Dallara 320	2020 Autopolis Super Formula Lights round
Formula Three	1:38.646	Sho Tsuboi	Dallara F317	2017 Autopolis Japanese F3 round
Formula Regional	1:43.165	Yuga Furutani	Dome F111/3	2020 Autopolis FRJC round
Super GT (GT300)	1:44.408	Hibiki Taira	Toyota GR86 GT300	2023 Autopolis GT 450km Race
Formula Renault 3.5	1:47.298	Armaan Ebrahim	Tatuus FRV6	2007 Autopolis Formula Renault V6 Asia round
Superbike	1:47.752	Yuki Okamoto	Yamaha YZF-R1	2024 Autopolis All Japan Road Race Championship Superbike round
Ferrari Challenge	1:48.810	Tosei Moriyama	Ferrari 296 Challenge	2025 Autopolis Ferrari Challenge Japan round
IMSA GTS	1:49.061	Steve Millen	Nissan 300ZX	1994 IMSA GT in Japan
Formula 4	1:52.183	Yuto Nomura	Toray Carbon Magic MCSC-24	2024 Autopolis Japanese F4 round
Supersport	1:53.455	Tomoyoshi Koyama	Honda CBR600RR	2020 Autopolis All Japan Road Race Championship Supersport round
Formula BMW	1:55.339	Marchy Lee	Mygale FB02	2004 Autopolis Formula BMW Asia round
Group A	1:55.768	Kazuyoshi Hoshino	Nissan Skyline GT-R BNR32	1993 Autopolis JTCC round
TCR Touring Car	1:56.798	Takuro Shinohara	Audi RS 3 LMS TCR	2020 Autopolis TCR Japan round
Moto3	1:57.265	Naoko Takasugi	KTM RC250R	2026 Autopolis All Japan Road Race Championship J-GP3 round
Super Touring	2:00.547	Anthony Reid	Vauxhall Cavalier 16v	1994 Autopolis JTCC round
Supersport 300	2:06.564	Katsuya Imai	Yamaha YZF-R3	2025 Autopolis All Japan Road Race Championship JP250 round
