= Marian Bublewicz =

Polish rally driver (1950–1993)

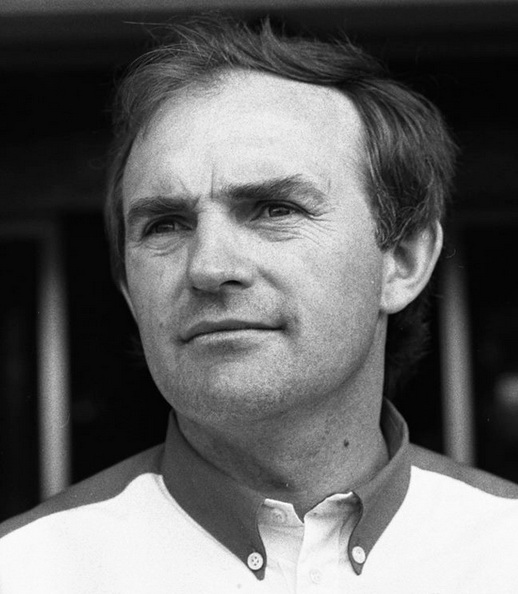
- Marian Bublewicz, ca. 1991–1992
- Nationality: (Poland) Polish
- Born: Marian Grzegorz Bublewicz; 25 August 1950 Olsztyn, Poland
- Died: 20 February 1993 (aged 42) Lądek-Zdrój, Poland
- Former teams: Marlboro Rally Team Poland
- Championships: Polish Rally Championship: 1975, 1983, 1987, 1989, 1990, 1991, 1992

Marian Grzegorz Bublewicz (25 August 1950 – 20 February 1993) was a Polish rally and racing driver of 80s born in Olsztyn, the home of Rally Poland. Including the triumph classes, Marian Bublewicz won the Polish Rally Championship 20 times.

== Career ==
He trained a lot, often in the forests near Olsztyn and this is what distinguished him from his rivals. He also financed his passion himself managing a car service garage where, in 1993, he employed 50 people.

Marian Bublewicz at the beginning of his career was a motocross driver, but a terrible accident destroyed his plans. He switched to driving a rally car. Marian Bublewicz became an icon of Polish sport.

In the 1980s Marian Bublewicz fought with Andrzej Koper. Their great rivalry forced them to import new sports cars from outside the Eastern Bloc. In this way raising the level of Polish rallies.

In 1983 Marian Bublewicz became a driver of official FSO Rally Team, using such cars as Polonez 2000 Rally and Polonez 2000 Turbo. Marian was very hard-working and had a habit of spending as much time on training as he could so OBRSO (FSO Development Division) constructed special Polonez training car based on 3 door body with fiberglass parts like in 2000 Turbo but with much cheaper, modified 1.5 OHV engine and smaller dog-clutch gearbox instead of 2.0 DOHC turbocharged engine with more expensive transmission. In 1987 Bublewicz won Polish Championship behind the wheel of Polonez 2000 Rally and it was the last time when this car was used by FSO Rally Team. Since 1988 Bublewicz changed make and started using private Mazda 323 4WD because A group Polonez 1.5C Turbo was not competitive enough.

In 1991, he was the first in Poland who created a professional team – Marlboro Rally Team Poland. In 1992 Bublewicz was the vice–champion of European Rally Championship and received the prize from Max Mosley's hands.

== Death ==
In 1993 his name was included in the priority list "A" – published by The Federation Internationale de l'Automobile. Bublewicz wanted to win another title, so he bought a factory Ford Escort Cosworth. His new car was not ready to start in the first rally, so he rented the Patrick Snijers's Ford Sierra RS Cosworth 4x4 from ERC.

Bublewicz started in the Winter Rally Lower Silesian as the number 1. He had won this rally seven times. During the rally, 2 km from the start of the 5th special stage of Orłowiec – Złoty Stok, on 20 February 1993 his car came off the road at a right hand corner where he struck a tree. The car wrapped around a tree and the safety cage failed and pierced him, but he remained conscious. Severely injured, Marian Bublewicz, was pulled out of the crashed car by fans and volunteer firemen. Marian Bublewicz died in hospital the same day Lądek-Zdrój.

Bublewicz in an interview said: "Many admirable rally drivers died, but I consider it as a mischance that can be quite quickly suffered by the loss of life in such discipline. It is a great tragedy when a man dies in sport competition."

== Aftermath ==
His death provoked a number of changes in safety and organisation standards on the rally special stages in Poland. Since 1994 season 10th winter Lower Silesian Rally is called "The Memorial of Marian Bublewicz".

In a poll held by the monthly newspaper "Auto Moto i Sport" in 2000, Marian Bublewicz was named 'The Best Polish Rally Driver of the 20th Century'.

The tree which Bublewicz's car drove into was later cut down and made into a cross. There has also been set a commemorative stone in that place.

== Polish Rally Champion ==
Season	Co-driver	Car
1983	Grzegorz Gac	Opel Kadett GT/E
1987	Grzegorz Gac	FSO Polonez 2000
1989	Grzegorz Gac	Mazda 323 4WD
1990	Grzegorz Gac	Mazda 323 4WD
1991	Ryszard Żyszkowski	Ford Sierra RS Cosworth
1992	Ryszard Żyszkowski	Ford Sierra RS Cosworth 4x4

== See also ==
- Andrzej Koper
- Paweł Przybylski
- Bogdan Herink
- Janusz Kulig
