= Bruno Huber =

Swiss astrologer (1930–1999)

Bruno Huber (November 29, 1930 – November 3, 1999) was a Swiss astrologer and psychologist. In 1968, with his wife, Louise Huber, he founded Astrological Psychology Institute, which became an internationally renowned school of Astrology. It was run according to humanist and psychological principles, based on Dr. Roberto Assagioli's theory of Psychosynthesis. The school initially offered personal teaching, and then professional Diploma training from 1973. Huber schools were subsequently established in UK and Spain. The Hubers’ teachings were gradually crystallised into books, which have subsequently been translated into many languages. Their holistic method of Astrological Psychology has a worldwide following.

== Early life and marriage ==
The young Bruno Huber had a voracious interest in astrology, psychology and philosophy, but became disillusioned with the practice of astrology at that time. In 1952 he met astrologer and esotericist Louise, discovering an immediate common bond. They married a year later and lived in Zürich.

== Astrological career ==
In 1956 they were involved for 2–3 years with setting up a branch of the Arcane School in Geneva.

In 1958, Huber was invited to Roberto Assagioli’s Psychosynthesis Institute in Florence, which led to the pair spending three years there assisting with running of the Institute and the documentation of Assagioli's psychosynthesis. During this period Bruno was able to perform extensive research into the horoscopes and psychological profiles of Assagioli's patients, and eventually he developed theories on horoscope interpretation that became the basis for Astrological Psychology, or Huber Astrology.

In 1963, the couple returned to Zürich. In 1968, Huber and his wife Louise began to give seminars on the results of their researches, and the Astrological Psychology Institute was founded. A following was soon established in the locality, and the teaching activities developed apace, going further afield in Switzerland and Germany, and then at international conferences, and in USA, UK, Spain and Brazil.

By the early 2000s tens of thousands of students had been through the courses, and equivalent courses were available through Huber Schools in Spain and in UK.

From 1981, the Hubers were also heavily involved in establishing, organising and presenting at three-yearly World Astrology Conferences in Switzerland.

== Health decline and death ==
In 1991 Bruno Huber had a heart attack, though he continued working. He died in 1999 and the teaching continued, led by his wife Louise.

== Published works ==
In 1974, Bruno and Louise Huber formed a publishing company, and a series of books gradually emerged; most have subsequently been published in English and in Spanish. Original German publication date and titles of the English translations are shown below. All books are jointly by Bruno & Louise Huber and first published in German, except where indicated.

- 1975 Man and His World / The Astrological Houses (change of title from first edition)
- 1980-83 Life Clock (first published in 2 volumes)
- 1981 Astrolog, the astrological psychology magazine established, and continues to this day.
- 1981-84 Astrological Psychosynthesis (Bruno Huber, German edition published in 3 volumes)
- 1981 Reflections & Meditations on the Signs of the Zodiac (Louise Huber)
- 1985 Life Clock III / Astrology as a Spiritual Path / Transformation (change of title from first edition)
- 1991 Moon Node Astrology
- 1995 Astro Glossarium I (Bruno Huber, German only)
- 1999 Aspect Pattern Astrology
- 2002 The Planets and their Psychological Meaning
- 2006 Astrology and the Seven Rays (first published in English)
