= Formula Crane 45 =

- Category: Single seaters
- Country: Japan
- Region: Autopolis, Ōita Prefecture
- Inaugural season: 1991
- Folded: 1992
- Constructors: Sabre Racing Cars
- Engine suppliers: Buick

The Formula Crane 45 was a single-seater racing series held at Autopolis in 1991 and 1992.

== History ==
Owner of the Autopolis circuit Tomonori Tsurumaki ordered 30 Buick powered US built single seater race cars called Sabre FC45 for a race to take place on his circuit's grand opening in November 1990, consisting of a mixture of invited US CART drivers such as Stan Fox, Johnny Rutherford, Dick Simon, Gary and Tony Bettenhausen against local Japanese drivers. The cars were originally built for a spec racing class to have been run by USAC; however, this class was never realized. After the grand opening, Tsurumaki planned on a series with the cars, known as Formula Crane 45. With only a handful of cars during the 1991 and 1992 season the class was not very successful. When Autopolis went bankrupt the assets including the cars were sold to the highest bidder.

=== 1991 ===
Round	Date	Winning driver
1	April 21	(Japan) Masatomo Shimizu
2	June 9	(Japan) Masatomo Shimizu
3	August 18	(Japan) Shunji Kasuya
4	November 11	(Japan) Shunji Kasuya

=== 1992 ===
Round	Date	Winning driver
1	May 31	(Japan) Shunji Kasuya
2	September 20	(Japan) Tetsuji Tamanaka
3	October 18	(Japan) Fumio Muto
4	November 22	(Japan) Tetsuji Tamanaka

== Champions ==
Year	Driver	Car
1991	(Japan) Masatomo Shimizu	Sabre FC45
1992	(Japan) Tetsuji Tamanaka	Sabre FC45
