= Andrzej Koper =

Polish rally driver

Andrzej Koper (born 9 May 1953) is a Polish rally driver. A four-time winner of the Polish Rally Championship, he was crowned champion in 1982, 1984, 1985 and 1988.

Koper was the first Polish driver to finish the Dakar Rally. He spent most of his career driving for Renault. He started in the European Rally Championship. Now he drives the Subaru Impreza N14 in the Polish Rally Championship.
