= Janusz Kulig =

Polish rally driver (1969–2004)

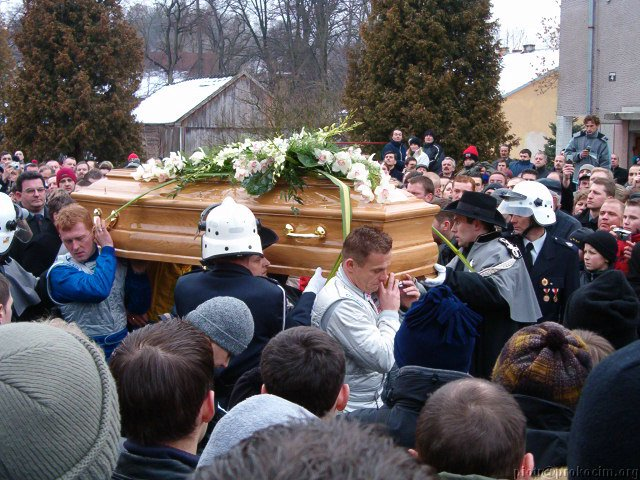
Janusz Kulig's funeral procession

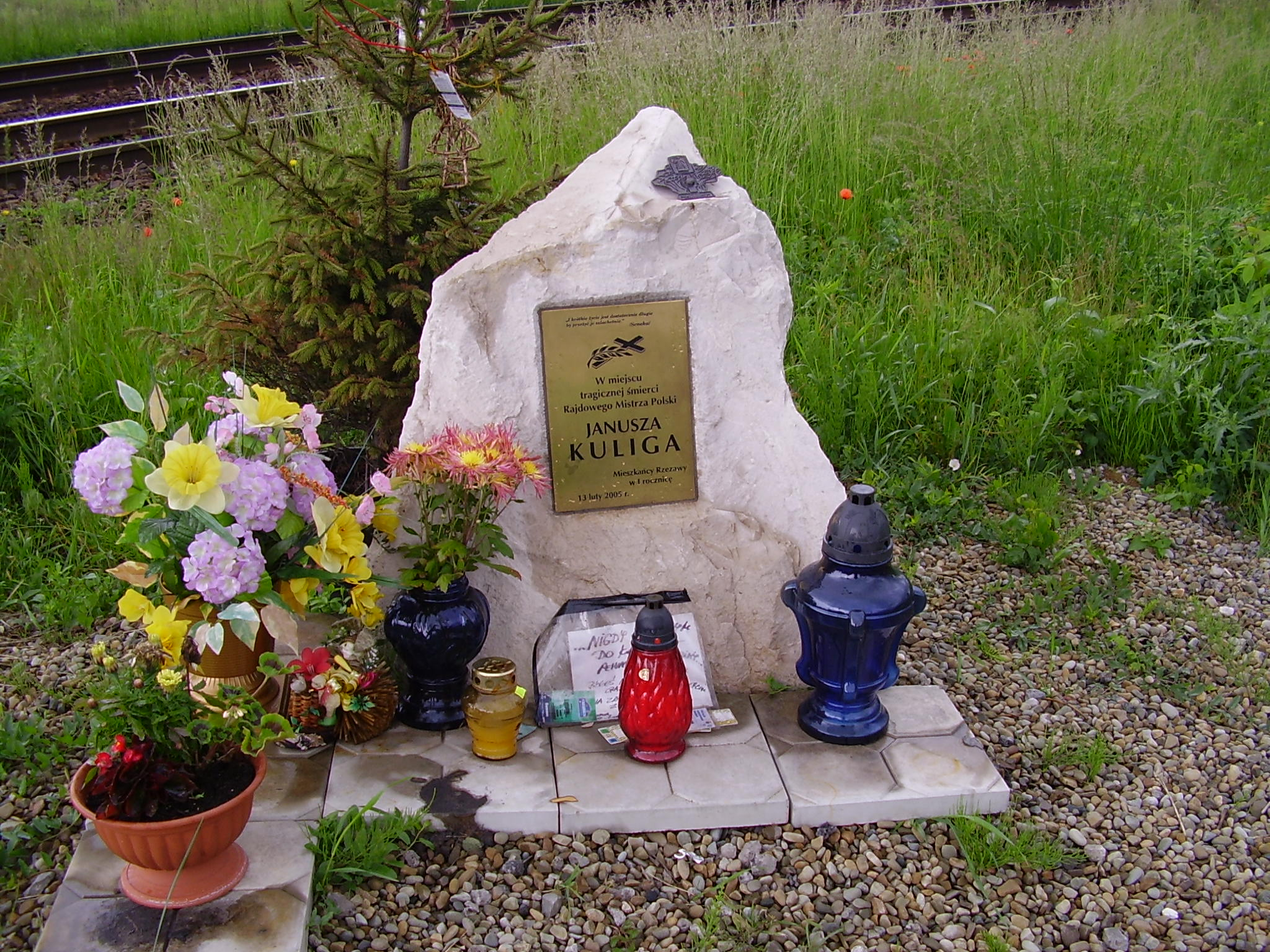
Obelisk next to level crossing in Rzezawa (Poland), dedicated to Janusz Kulig

Janusz Kulig (19 October 1969 in Łapanów near Kraków – 13 February 2004 in Rzezawa near Bochnia, Poland) was a Polish rally driver. He started his career behind the wheel of a Polski Fiat 126p and during his early years in rally he also drove a Toyota Corolla, an Opel Kadett, and a Renault Clio. He became one of the top drivers while driving Renault Mégane Maxi. In this car he also won his first Polish Rally Championship title in 1997. After 2 seasons with Renault, he signed a contract with Marlboro Mobil 1 team. He changed his car to a Ford Escort WRC and in following years to a Ford Focus WRC. Those years were most successful for Kulig. He won another 2 Polish Championship titles and became well known in European and World rally. Kulig spent the 2002 and 2003 seasons competing in the European Rally Championship (2nd place in 2002) and occasional WRC events. In 2002 Janusz Kulig won the Rally du Valais. His biggest success in WRC was 1st place in PCWRC in Sweden 2003 but after the rally he was stripped of his glory by FIA due to illegal modifications in his Mitsubishi Lancer EVO VII (the flywheel had different streak than the one approved by FIA). For the 2004 Polish Championship Season he signed a contract to drive Fiat Punto S1600. He had a wife and two daughters.

Kulig died in an accident after his car (Fiat Stilo) collided with a train on a level crossing. The crossing barriers were not lowered.

== Statistics ==
- 1997 – Polish Rally Championship title
- 1998 – Runner-up for Polish Rally Championship title, FIA Central European Rally championship title
- 1999 – Runner-up for Polish Rally Championship title, FIA Central European Rally championship title
- 2000 – Polish Rally Championship title
- 2001 – Polish Rally Championship title, Slovak Rally Championship title, FIA Northern European Rally Championship title
- 2002 – Runner-up for FIA European Rally Championship title
