= Jo Zeller =

Swiss racing driver

- Nationality: (Switzerland) Swiss
- Born: 17 July 1955 (age 71) Männedorf (Switzerland)
- Relatives: Sandro Zeller (son)

Championship titles
- 1982,1984,1990-1992, 1995,1998-2003: Swiss Formula Three Championship

Jo Zeller (born 17 July 1955 in Männedorf) is a Swiss racing driver. He has raced in such series as Austria Formula 3 Cup and is a twelve-time Swiss Formula Three champion. In the early 1990s, he set up his own racing team, Jo Zeller Racing, which has raced in series such as Formula 3 Euro Series, Formula Lista Junior, Austria Formula 3 Cup and the German Formula Three Championship.
