= Polish Rally Championship =

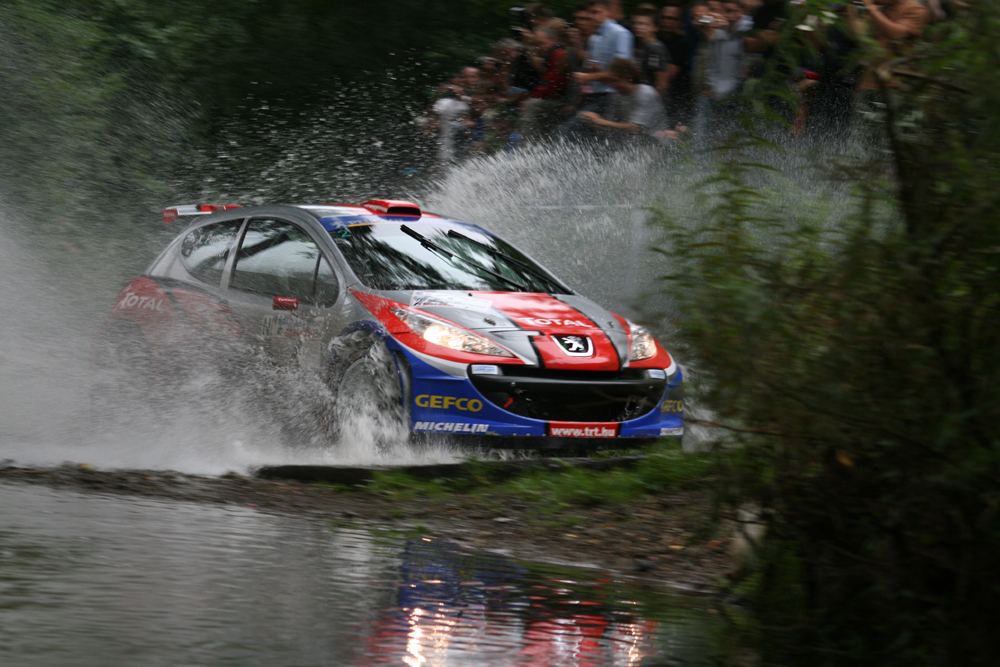
Three times champion Bryan Bouffier in his Peugeot 207 S2000 during Rzeszowski Rally 2007

Rajdowe Samochodowe Mistrzostwa Polski (RSMP) – the annual series of Polish Rally Championship existing from 1928. Consisting of several rounds on different surfaces throughout Poland. The organizer and owner of the cycle is Polski Związek Motorowy (PZM). In 2008 the main sponsor of the series is Orlen oil company and its full name is Platinum Rajdowe Samochodowe Mistrzostwa Polski (Platinum Car Rally Championship Polish).

A prerequisite for the start to RSMP is to have a rally license degree "R" or "R co-driver only" (entitles you to take off only as a co-driver). As of 2026, foreign drivers have been allowed to gain points.

== History ==
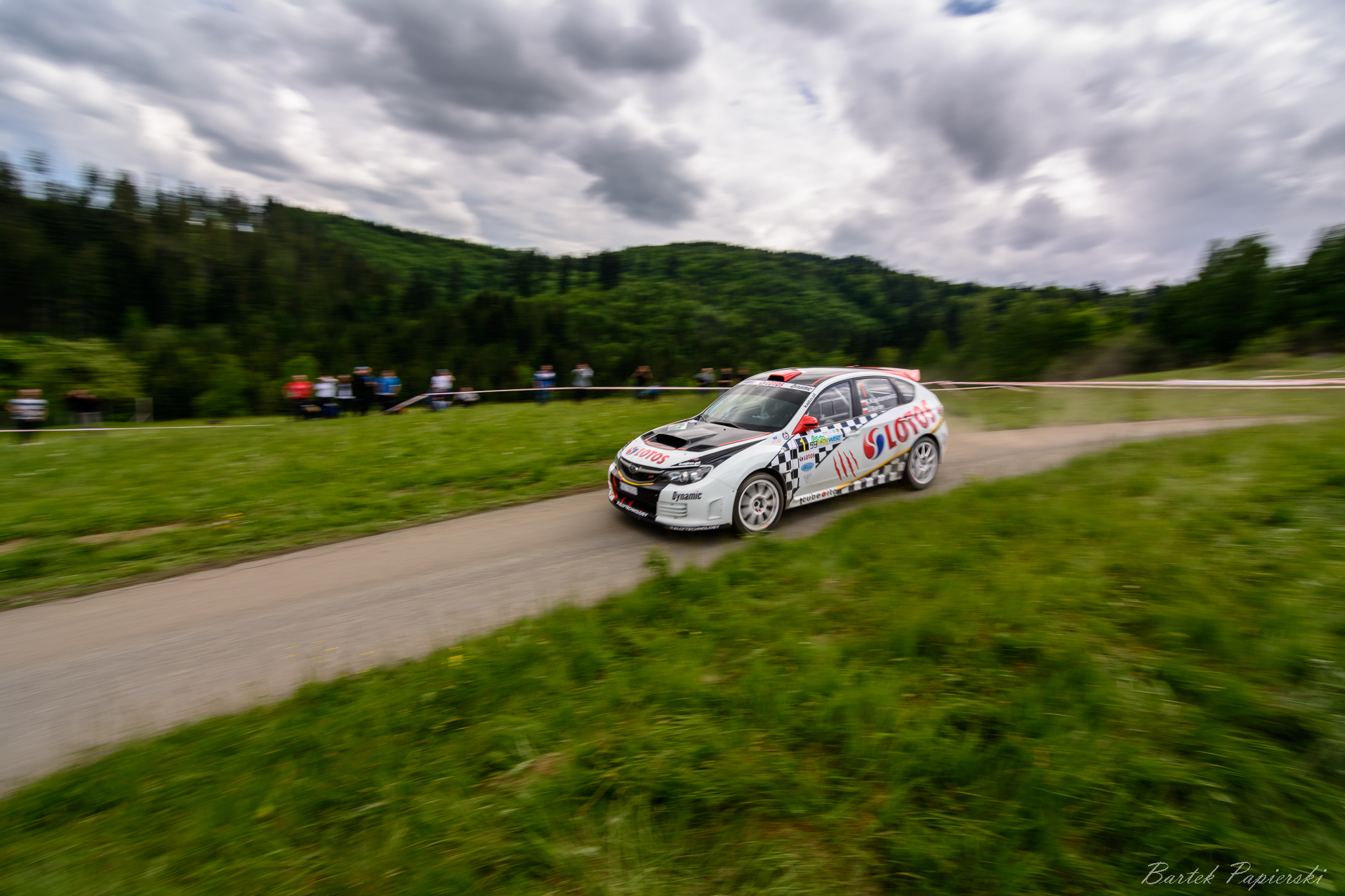
Four times champion Kajetan Kajetanowicz in his Subaru Impreza STi R4 during Wisla Rally 2013

Rallies in Poland almost always were at a high level of security and organisation. The Second World War stopped high advancement of rallies. After the war Polish Rallies had problems. Just in 60s RSMP launched in high level. Great Polish drivers went to the conquest of Europe and Sobiesław Zasada has proved to be the best, he won three European Rally Championship titles (now World Rally Championship). He imported the latest sports cars, so he dominate of RSMP. In 1975 won title young driver Marian Bublewicz in Polski Fiat 125p from Olsztyn. Since then RSMP won different drivers: Tomasz Ciecierzyński, Włodzimierz Groblewski, Jerzy Landsberg, Błażej Krupa, Maciej Stawowiak, Tomasz Ciecierzyński.

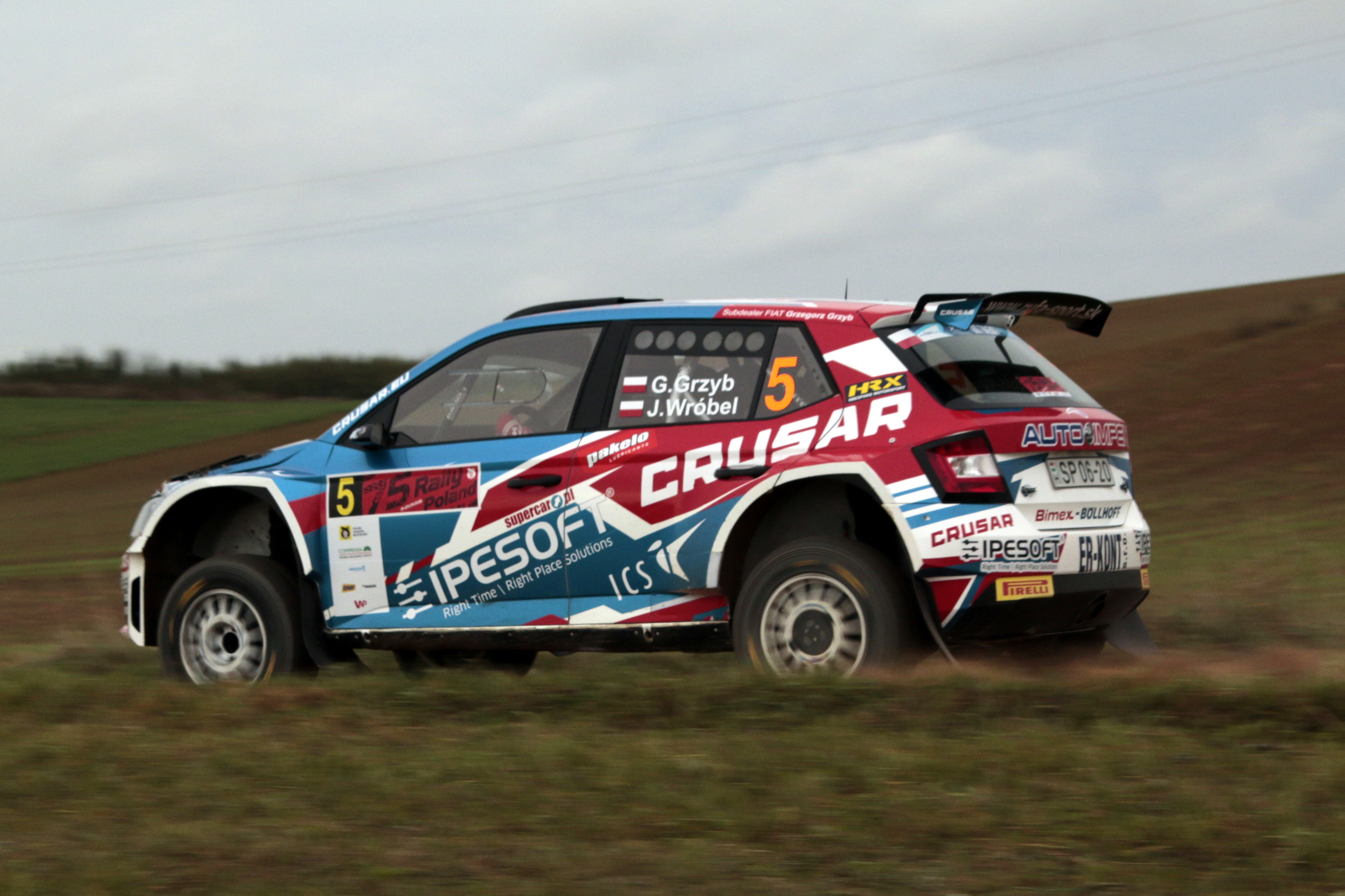
Three times champion Grzegorz Grzyb in his Škoda Fabia R5 during Rally Poland 2018

In 1980s for a title fight Marian Bublewicz and Andrzej Koper. They imported Japanese sports cars and Renault. Only in 1987 Bublewicz won championship in Polonez 2000. so it was amazing. In 1989–1992 Bublewicz had no equal. In 1993 he purchased Ford Escort Cosworth for next title, but new car was not ready for the first in season Zimowy Rajd Dolnośląski. He started in hired Ford Sierra. For unknown reasons, he lost car and hit in tree. Marian Bublewicz died in hospital. Polish fans and PZM were shocked. Bublewicz's fatal crash caused work on security.

In the 1990s for title going Paweł Przybylski, Krzysztof Hołowczyc, Robert Gryczyński and Janusz Kulig. All the leading drivers have cars from World Rally Championship.

== Polish Rally Champions ==
After 1966

Season	Champion	Car
2025	(Poland) Jakub Matulka	Škoda Fabia RS Rally2
2024	(Poland) Jarosław Szeja	Škoda Fabia Rally2 evo
2023	(Poland) Grzegorz Grzyb	Škoda Fabia Rally2 evo
2022	(Sweden) Tom Kristensson	Hyundai i20 R5
2021	(Poland) Mikołaj Marczyk	Škoda Fabia Rally2 evo
2020	(Finland) Jari Huttunen	Hyundai i20 R5
2019	(Poland) Mikołaj Marczyk	Škoda Fabia R5
2018	(Poland) Grzegorz Grzyb	Škoda Fabia R5
2017	(Poland) Filip Nivette	Škoda Fabia R5
2016	(Poland) Grzegorz Grzyb	Ford Fiesta R5; Škoda Fabia R5; Peugeot 208 VTI
2015	(Poland) Łukasz Habaj	Ford Fiesta R5
2014	(Poland) Wojciech Chuchała	Ford Fiesta R5
2013	(Poland) Kajetan Kajetanowicz	Subaru Impreza STi R4; Ford Fiesta R5
2012	(Poland) Kajetan Kajetanowicz	Subaru Impreza STi R4
2011	(Poland) Kajetan Kajetanowicz	Subaru Impreza STi R4
2010	(Poland) Kajetan Kajetanowicz	Subaru Impreza TMR 10
2009	(France) Bryan Bouffier	Mitsubishi Lancer Evo IX
2008	(France) Bryan Bouffier	Peugeot 207 S2000
2007	(France) Bryan Bouffier	Peugeot 207 S2000
2006	(Poland) Leszek Kuzaj	Subaru Impreza STi N11
2005	(Poland) Leszek Kuzaj	Subaru Impreza STi N11
2004	(Poland) Leszek Kuzaj	Subaru Impreza STi N10
2003	(Poland) Tomasz Czopik	Subaru Impreza WRC '99; Mitsubishi Lancer Evo VII
2002	(Poland) Leszek Kuzaj	Toyota Corolla WRC; Peugeot 206 WRC
2001	(Poland) Janusz Kulig	Ford Focus RS WRC '00
2000	(Poland) Janusz Kulig	Ford Focus RS WRC '99
1999	(Poland) Krzysztof Hołowczyc	Subaru Impreza WRC '98
1998	(Poland) Robert Gryczyński	Toyota Celica GT-Four (ST205); Toyota Corolla WRC
1997	(Poland) Janusz Kulig	Renault Mégane Maxi
1996	(Poland) Krzysztof Hołowczyc	Toyota Celica Turbo 4WD (ST185)
1995	(Poland) Krzysztof Hołowczyc	Toyota Celica Turbo 4WD (ST185)
1994	(Poland) Paweł Przybylski	Toyota Celica GT-4 (ST165)
1993	(Poland) Paweł Przybylski	Toyota Celica GT-4 (ST165)
1992	(Poland) Marian Bublewicz	Ford Sierra RS Cosworth 4x4
1991	(Poland) Marian Bublewicz	Ford Sierra RS Cosworth
1990	(Poland) Marian Bublewicz	Mazda 323 4WD
1989	(Poland) Marian Bublewicz	Mazda 323 4WD
1988	(Poland) Andrzej Koper	Renault 11 Turbo
1987	(Poland) Marian Bublewicz	Polonez 2000
1986	(Poland) Mariusz Kostrzak	Toyota Corolla
1985	(Poland) Andrzej Koper	Renault 5 Alpine; Renault 11 Turbo
1984	(Poland) Andrzej Koper	Renault 5 Alpine
1983	(Poland) Marian Bublewicz	Opel Kadett GT/E
1982	(Poland) Andrzej Koper	Renault 5 Alpine
1981	(Poland) Tomasz Ciecierzyński	Polonez 2000
1980	(Poland) Maciej Stawowiak	Polonez 2000
1979	(Poland) Błażej Krupa	Renault 5 Alpine
1978	(Poland) Jerzy Landsberg	Opel Kadett GT/E
1977	(Poland) Włodzimierz Groblewski	Polski Fiat 125p
1976	(Poland) Tomasz Ciecierzyński	Polski Fiat 125p
1975	(Poland) Marian Bublewicz	Polski Fiat 125p
1974	(Poland) Błażej Krupa	Renault 12 Gordini
1973	(Poland) Sobiesław Zasada	Porsche Carrera RS
1972	(Poland) Krystian Bielowski	Polski Fiat 125p
1971	(Poland) Włodzimierz Markowski	Polski Fiat 125p
1970	(Poland) Adam Masłowiec	FSO Syrena 104
1969	(Poland) Ryszard Nowicki	Renault 8 Gordini
1968	(Poland) Sobiesław Zasada	Porsche 911
1967	(Poland) Sobiesław Zasada	Porsche 912; Lancia Fulvia 1.3 Coupé HF

=== Multiple wins by individual ===
	Name	Titles	Winning years
(Poland)	Marian Bublewicz	7	1975, 1983, 1987, 1989, 1990, 1991, 1992
(Poland)	Andrzej Koper	4	1982, 1984, 1985, 1988
(Poland)	Leszek Kuzaj	4	2002, 2004, 2005, 2006
(Poland)	Kajetan Kajetanowicz	4	2010, 2011, 2012, 2013
(Poland)	Sobiesław Zasada	3	1967, 1968, 1973
(Poland)	Krzysztof Hołowczyc	3	1995, 1996, 1999
(Poland)	Janusz Kulig	3	1997, 2000, 2001
(Poland)	Grzegorz Grzyb	3	2016, 2018, 2023
(France)	Bryan Bouffier	3	2007, 2008, 2009
(Poland)	Błażej Krupa	2	1974, 1979
(Poland)	Paweł Przybylski	2	1993, 1994
(Poland)	Mikołaj Marczyk	2	2019, 2021
