= Rajd Dolnośląski =

Rajd Dolnośląski (Lower Silesian Rally) is a rallying event organized each year by the Automobilklub Ziemi Kłodzkiej, a group that also was the organizer for the Rally Poland. The rally base is in Kłodzko.

The rally features a special stage in the Stołowe Mountains.
