= Swiss Formula Three Championship =

- Category: Single-seaters
- Inaugural season: 1978
- Folded: 2022
- Constructors: Dallara
- Last Drivers' champion: Sandro Zeller
- Last Teams' champion: Jo Zeller Racing

The Swiss Formula Three Championship is a Level 2 European Formula Three car racing series made up of circuit races and also hillclimbs. Despite its name, the bulk of the series events was held in neighbouring countries due to the legal difficulties of organising motorsport events in Switzerland and the lack of available facilities in Switzerland. Most events were held in Italy and France. The series however did have a prominent role in promoting Swiss drivers. The championship folded in 2009, but restarted again in 2014. The Swiss Formula 3 Cup now is a championship run for Swiss drivers only that participate in the Remus Formula 3 Championships, Cup races simultaneously held with the Austria Formula 3 Cup.

== Champions ==
All champions were Swiss-registered.

Season	Champion	Team Champion	Car	Categories
1978	Patrick Studer	Formel Rennsport Club	Chevron-Toyota	A
1979	Beat Blatter	Sauber Racing	Lola-Chevron-Toyota	A
1980	Jakob Bordoli	Bordoli Racing	Ralt-Toyota	A
1981	Marcel Wettstein	Squadra Caposcarico	Ralt-Toyota	A
1982	Jo Zeller	Formel Rennsport Club	Ralt-Toyota	A
1983	Hans-Peter Kaufmann	Formel Rennsport Club	Ralt-Alfa Romeo	A
1984	Jo Zeller	Formel Rennsport Club	Ralt-Toyota	A
1985	Jakob Bordoli	Scuderia Calandra	Ralt-Toyota	A
1986	Gregor Foitek	Squadra Foitek	Dallara-Volkswagen	A
1987	Jakob Bordoli	Formel Rennsport Club	Martini-Volkswagen	A
1988	Jakob Bordoli	Formel Rennsport Club	Martini-Volkswagen	A
1989	Jacques Isler	Squadra Foitek	Dallara-Alfa Romeo	A
1990	Jo Zeller	Zeller Racing	Dallara-Alfa Romeo	A
1991	Jo Zeller	Zeller Racing	Dallara-Alfa Romeo	A
1992	Jo Zeller	Zeller Racing	Dallara-Alfa Romeo	A
1993	Rüdi Schurter	KMS Racing	Dallara-Opel	A
1994	Rüdi Schurter	KMS Racing	Dallara-Opel	A
1995	Jo Zeller	Zeller Racing	Dallara-Fiat	A
1996	Norbert Zehnder	KMS Racing	Dallara-Opel	A
1997	Norbert Zehnder	KMS Racing	Dallara-Opel	A
1998	Jo Zeller	Zeller Racing	Dallara-Opel	A
1998	Thomas Stingelin		Ralt-Alfa Romeo	B
1999	Jo Zeller	Zeller Racing	Dallara-Opel	A
1999	Andrè Gauch		Ralt-Alfa Romeo	B
2000	Jo Zeller	Zeller Racing	Dallara-Opel	A
2000	Andreas Bahler		Dallara-Opel	B
2001	Jo Zeller	Zeller Racing	Dallara-Opel	A
2001	Jurg Felix		Dallara-Fiat	B
2002	Jo Zeller	Zeller Racing	Dallara-Opel	A
2002	Bruno Huber		Dallara-Alfa Romeo	B
2003	Jo Zeller	Zeller Racing	Dallara-Opel	A
2004	Patrick Dütsch	Zeller Racing	Dallara-Opel	A
2005	Anthony Sinopoli	GSG Racing Team	Dallara-Opel	A
2006	Jo Zeller	Zeller Racing	Dallara-Opel	A
2007	Jo Zeller	Zeller Racing	Dallara-Opel	A
2008	Jo Zeller	Zeller Racing	Dallara-Opel	A
2009–2013 Not held
2014	Thomas Amweg	Jo Zeller Racing	Dallara-Mercedes	A
2015	Kurt Böhlen	Franz Wöss Racing	Dallara-Opel	A
2016	Sandro Zeller	Jo Zeller Racing	Dallara-Mercedes	A
2017	Sandro Zeller	Jo Zeller Racing	Dallara-Mercedes	A
2018	Sandro Zeller	Jo Zeller Racing	Dallara-Mercedes	A
2019	Sandro Zeller	Jo Zeller Racing	Dallara-Mercedes	A
2020	Sandro Zeller	Jo Zeller Racing	Dallara-Mercedes	A
2021	Sandro Zeller	Jo Zeller Racing	Dallara-Mercedes	A

Swiss Formula Three Championship: Seasons 1978–2002
1978

1 Patrick Studer Chevron B43-Toyota 145,

2 Louis Maulini Ralt RT1 108,

3 Bruno Eichmann Argo JM1-BMW 102,

4 Walo Schibler Chevron 85,

5 Armin Conrad Argo JM1-BMW 39,

6 Walter Baltisser Lola T670 36,

7 Roland Bitterlin Lola T670 33,

8 Benoit Morand Chevron 19,

9 Hanspeter Stoll Ralt RT1-BMW 18,

10 Fredy Eschenmoser Lola T670 6,

Best 8 results from 7 races and 5 hillclimbs with a minimum of 6 results.

1979

1 Beat Blatter Lola T670-Toyota, March 783-Toyota 170,

2 Edy Kobelt Lola T670-Toyota 136,

3 Louis Maulini Ralt RT1 127,

4 Max F. Welti Lola T670-Toyota 104,

5 Armin Conrad Argo JM1-Toyota 102,

6 Hanspeter Stoll Chevron-Toyota 50,

7 Philipp Müller Ralt RT1 45,

8 Urs Dudler Ralt RT1-BMW 35,

9 Roland Bitterlin Lola T672 34,

10 Jean-Pierre Rochat Ralt RT1-Toyota 13,

Best 9 results from 6 races and 7 hillclimbs with a minimum of 3 results.

1980

1 Jakob Bordoli Ralt RT1-Toyota 122,

2 Louis Maulini March 803 122,

3 Edy Kobelt Argo 127,

4 Pierre-Alain Lombardi Lola 79,

5 Hanspeter Stoll Chevron-Toyota 55,

6 Armin Conrad March 793 44,

7 Marcel Wettstein Ralt RT1-Toyota 41,

8 Jean-Pierre Lebet Lola 34,

9 Walo Schibler Chevron 26,

10 Jürg Lienhardt March 803-Toyota 23,

Best 7 results from 5 races and 5 hillclimbs with a minimum of 3 results.

1981

1 Jakob Wettstein Ralt RT1-Toyota 111,

2 Walo Schibler Chevron 99,

3 Beat Blatter Argo 74,

4 Philipp Müller Ralt 61,

5 Louis Maulini March 803 55,

6 Rolf Egger Ralt 43,

7 Armin Conrad Argo 36,

8 Hanspeter Kaufmann March 803-Toyota 34,

9 Fridolin Wettstein Ralt RT1-Toyota 33,

10 Josef Binder Argo 22,

Best 7 results from 5 races and 6 hillclimbs (less 1 cancellation due to support race fatality) with a minimum of 3 results.

1982

1 Jo Zeller Ralt RT3/81-Toyota 140,

2 Hanspeter Kaufmann March 803-Toyota 88,

3 Jakob Bordoli Martini MK31-Toyota 87,

4 Urs Dudler March 783-Toyota 78,

5 Walo Schibler March 783-Toyota 77,

6 Hanspeter Gafner Chevron 45,

7 Fredy Eschenmoser Ralt RT3/81-Toyota 36,

8 Bernard Leisi March 763, Ralt 33,

9 Georges A. Hedinger Ralt RT1 29,

10 Fridolin Wettstein Ralt RT1-Toyota 26,

Best 7 results from 5 races and 6 hillclimbs with a minimum of 3 results.

1983

1 Hanspeter Kaufmann Ralt RT3-Alfa Romeo 103

2 Walo Schibler March 803-Toyota 98

3 Urs Dudler Ralt RT3 92

4 Jakob Bordoli Ralt RT3-Toyota 90

5 Bernard Leisi Ralt RT1 73

6 Marcel Wettstein Argo JM10-Toyota 56

7 Georges A. Hedinger Argo, Martini 48

8 "Albin" Ralt RT3 42

9 Ruedi Wegmann Ralt RT3 32

10 Jürg Vogt Martini MK37, Ralt RT3-Toyota 27

Best 7 results from 6 races (less 1 cancellation due to snow) and 6 hillclimbs with a minimum of 3 results.

1984

1 Jo Zeller Ralt RT3/83-Toyota 122

2 Bernard Leisi Ralt RT3 120

3 Jakob Bordoli Ralt RT3, 91

4 Walter Kupferschmid Ralt RT3 66

5 Beat Amacher Ralt RT3 60

6 Ruedi Schurter Martini MK37 57

7 Gianni Bianchi Ralt RT3-VW 50

8 Gérard Vallat Ralt RT3 26

9 Ruedi Wegmann Ralt RT3 24

10 Roland Dupasquier Lola 16

Best 7 results from 5 races and 4 hillclimbs with a minimum of 3 results.

1985

1 Jakob Bordoli Ralt RT3-Toyota 140

2 Jo Zeller Ralt RT3/83-Toyota 120

3 Ruedi Schurter Martini MK37 85

4 Urs Dudler Ralt RT3-Alfa Romeo 66

5 Franz Hunkeler Martini MK42-Alfa Romeo 48

6 Walter Kupferschmid Ralt RT3 48

7 Roland Dupasquier René 613 45

8 Dieter Wälti March 793 32

9 Pierre Hirschi Ralt 22

10 Bruno Huber Argo JM1 17

Best 7 results from 5 races and 6 hillclimbs with a minimum of 3 results.

1986

1 Gregor Foitek Dallara F386-Volkswagen 127

2 Jakob Bordoli Martini MK45-Volkswagen, Swica 386-Alfa Romeo 119

3 Urs Dudler Ralt RT3/83-Alfa Romeo 107

4 Jo Zeller Ralt RT30/86 87

5 Ruedi Schurter Anson Reynard 853 75

6 Fritz Augsburger Reynard 74

7 Gianni Pontiggia Dallara-Alfa Romeo 39

8 Walter Kupferschmid Ralt RT3-Alfa Romeo 31

9 Pierre Hirschi Martini MK45-Alfa Romeo 30

10 Romeo Nüssli Martini MK37-Toyota 19

Best 7 results from 6 races and 6 hillclimbs with a minimum of 6 results.

1987

1 Jakob Bordoli Martini MK45-Volkswagen 150

2 Rolf Kuhn Reynard 873-Volkswagen 144

3 Jo Zeller Ralt RT30/86-Toyota 89

4 Jacques Isler Dallara F386-VW 81

5 Bernard Thuner Martini MK45-Alfa Romeo 70

6 Roland Franzen Martini MK49-VW 63

7 Hanspeter Kaufmann Dallara F386-VW 60

8 Ruedi Schurter Reynard-VW 50

9 Peter Stoller Swica 387-VW 46

10 Christophe Hurni Swica 387-VW 37

Best 5 results from 6 races (less 1 cancellation due to fatal accident to Dieter Wälti) and 1 hillclimb + best 4 results from 6 hillclimbs with a minimum of 3 results.

1988

1 Jakob Bordoli Martini MK52-Volkswagwen 144

2 Bernard Thuner Dallara F387-Alfa Romeo 141

3 Jo Zeller Ralt RT32-Toyota 124

4 Rolf Kuhn Reynard 883-VW 122

5 Roland Franzen Martini MK49-Alfa Romeo, Dallara F388-VW 63

6 Ruedi Schurter Reynard 873-VW 56

7 Christophe Hurni Reynard 883-VW 51

8 Jacques Isler Dallara F388-VW, Dallara F386-VW 41

9 Roland Bossy Dallara F387-Alfa Romeo 31

10 Pierre Hirschi Dallara F388-Alfa Romeo, Dallara F387-VW 28

Best 5 results from 6 races and 1 hillclimb + best 4 results from 6 hillclimbs with a minimum of 3 results.

1989

1 Jacques Isler Dallara F388-Alfa Romeo 147

2 Jo Zeller Ralt RT32-Toyota 140

3 Rolf Kuhn Reynard 893-Volkswagen 109

4 Christophe Hurni Reynard 893-VW, Reynard 883-VW 86 5 Roland Bossy Dallara F387-Alfa Romeo 84

6 Roland Franzen Dallara F388-Alfa Romeo, Dallara F388-VW 62

7 Ruedi Schurter Reynard 883-VW, Reynard 873-VW 57

8 Pierre Hirschi Dallara-Alfa Romeo 32

9 Pierre-André Cossy Martini MK49-VW 21

10 Romeo Nüssli Martini MK45-VW 21

Best 4 results from 5 races and 1 hillclimb + best 4 results from 6 hillclimbs with a minimum of 3 results.

1990

1 Jo Zeller Ralt RT34-Alfa Romeo 190

2 Jacques Isler Dallara F390-Alfa Romeo, Dallara F389-Alfa Romeo, Dallara F388-Alfa Romeo 158

3 Roland Bossy Reynard 893-Alfa Romeo, Dallara-Alfa Romeo, Martini-Alfa Romeo 119

4 Christophe Hurni Reynard 893-Alfa Romeo 98

5 Ruedi Schurter Reynard 883-VW 96

6 Walter Kupferschmid Martini MK58-VW 68

7 Romeo Nüssli Martini MK52-VW 55

8 Yolanda Surer Dallara F388-Alfa Romeo 31

9 Gianni Bianchi Dallara-Opel 29

10 Fritz Augsburger Reynard 893-VW 24

11 Philip Steinauer Reynard 903-VW 21

12 Brendon Cook (AUS) Ralt RT23-Alfa Romeo 18

Best 4 results from 5 races and 1 hillclimb + best 4 results from 6 hillclimbs with a minimum of 3 results.

1991

1 Jo Zeller Ralt RT34-Alfa Romeo 140

2 Ruedi Schurter Ralt RT34-Alfa Romeo 112

3 Walter Kupferschmid Martini-Volkswagen 73

4 Gianni Bianchi Dallara 390-Opel 53

5 Romeo Nüssli Martini MK52-VW 47

6 Philippe Brennenstuhl Reynard-Alfa Romeo 43

7 Philip Steinauer Reynard 903-VW 37

8 Andreas Bähler Ralt RT32-Toyota 30

9 Peter Fischer Martini MK58-VW 29

10 Peter Bachofen Reynard 873-Alfa Romeo 20

Best 4 results from 6 races plus best 3 results from 5 hillclimbs with a minimum of 3 results.

1992

1 Jo Zeller Ralt RT35-Alfa Romeo 140

2 Ruedi Schurter Dallara F392-Alfa Romeo, Dallara-Opel 104

3 Hanspeter Kaufmann Dallara F391-Opel 73

4 Walter Kupferschmid Martini-VW 63

5 Urs Rüttimann Ralt RT34-Alfa Romeo 47

6 Gianni Bianchi Dallara-Opel 47

7 Peter Fischer Martini MK60-VW 38

8 Hansruedi Debrunner Martini MK58-VW 34

9 Yvan Berset Reynard-Alfa Romeo 33

10 Romeo Nüssli Martini MK52-VW 32

Best 4 results from 6 races plus best 3 results from 5 hillclimbs with a minimum of 3 results.

1993

1 Ruedi Schurter Dallara F393-Opel 105

2 Jo Zeller Ralt RT37-Fiat 99

3 Jakob Bordoli Dallara F392-Honda 94

4 Christian Fischer Dallara F392-Opal 77

5 Urs Rüttimann Ralt RT35-Alfa Romeo 60

6 Bruno Huber Ralt RT34-Alfa Romeo 46

7 Paolo Laghi Dallara F392 34

8 Pierre Hirschi Dallara F392-Alfa Romeo 32

9 Andreas Bähler Ralt RT32-Toyota 27

10 Peter Fischer Martini MK60-VW 23

Best 3 results from 5 races plus best 3 results of 1 race and 4 hillclimbs with a minimum of 3 results.

1994

1 Ruedi Schurter Dallara F393-Opel 130

2 Jo Zeller Dallara F393-Fiat 125

3 Yvan Berset Dallara F393-Opel 87

4 Norbert Zehnder Dallara F392-Opal 74

5 Claude Sudan Dallara F393-Fiat 60

6 Andreas Bähler Ralt RT35-Alfa Romeo 58

7 Bruno Huber Ralt RT34-Alfa Romeo 26

8 Denis Schubiger Ralt RT32-Toyota 17

9 Rudolf Meyer Jr. Dallara F389-Alfa Romeo 17

10 Hansruedi Debrunner Martini MK58-VW 15

Best 4 results from 6 races plus best 3 results of 5 hillclimbs with a minimum of 3 results.

1995

1 Jo Zeller Dallara F393-Fiat 140

2 Norbert Zehnder Dallara F394-Opal 93

3 Steve Ventruto Dallara F394 83

4 Andreas Bähler Ralt RT35-Alfa Romeo 82

5 Claude Sudan Dallara F393-Fiat 60

6 Paolo Laghi Dallara Honda 51

7 Denis Schubiger Dallara F393-Opal 40

8 Hansruedi Debrunner Dallara F393-Opal 34

9 Willi Sträuli Dallara F392-Alfa Romeo 26

10 Bruno Huber Ralt RT34-Alfa Romeo 26

Best 4 results from 6 races plus best 3 results of 5 hillclimbs with a minimum of 3 results.

1996

1 Norbert Zehnder Dallara F394-Opel 117

2 Jo Zeller Ralt 93C-Alfa Romeo 117

3 Paolo Laghi Dallara F394 110

4 Andreas Bähler Dallara F393-Fiat 90

5 Hansruedi Debrunner Dallara F393-Opel 48

6 Willi Sträuli Dallara F392-Alfa Romeo 44

7 Urs Rüttimann Ralt RT37 34

8 André Gauch Martini MK58 22

9 Thomas Stingelin Ralt RT36-Alfa Romeo 19

10 Heribert Bäriswyl Dallara F388-VW 17

Best 4 results from 6 races plus best 3 results of 5 hillclimbs (less 1 cancellation due to fog) with a minimum of 3 results.

1997

1 Norbert Zehnder Dallara F394-Opel 130

2 Jo Zeller Dallara F394-Opel 125

3 Paolo Laghi Dallara F394-Honda 95

4 Andreas Bähler Dallara F393-Fiat 81

5 Hansruedi Debrunner Dallara F393-Opel 56

6 Urs Rüttimann Ralt 93C-Alfa Romeo 30

7 Bruno Huber Ralt RT35-Alfa Romeo 30

8 Willi Sträuli Dallara F392-Alfa Romeo 26

9 Thomas Stingelin Ralt RT36-Alfa Romeo 23

10 Markus Döbeli Ralt RT33-Alfa Romeo 20

Best 3 results from 5 races plus best 4 results of 1 race and 5 hillclimbs with a minimum of 3 results.

1998

Division A

1 Jo Zeller Dallara F394-Opel 140

2 Hansruedi Debrunner Dallara F393-Opel 96

3 Markus Döbeli Ralt 93C-Alfa Romeo 82

4 Thomas Stingelin Ralt RT36-Alfa Romeo 59

5 Urs Rüttimann Dallara F394-Opel 55

6 Bruno Huber Ralt RT35-Alfa Romeo 54

7 Heribert Bäriswyl Dallara F392-Alfa Romeo 44

8 Willi Sträuli Dallara F395-Fiat 39

9 Peter Bachofen Ralt RT36-Alfa Romeo 38

10 Kurt Keller Dallara Honda 15

Best 4 results from 6 races plus best 3 results of 5 hillclimbs with a minimum of 3 results.

Division B

1 Thomas Stingelin Ralt RT36-Alfa Romeo 115

2 Bruno Huber Ralt RT35-Alfa Romeo 114

3 Heribert Bäriswyl Dallara F392-Alfa Romeo 99

4 Peter Bachofen Ralt RT36-Alfa Romeo 85

5 Kurt Keller Dallara Honda 42

6 Gabriel Muller Dallara F392-Alfa Romeo 35

Best 4 results from 6 races plus best 3 results of 5 hillclimbs with a minimum of 3 results.

1999

Division A

1 Jo Zeller Dallara F396-Opel 140

2 Thomas Stingelin Dallara F394-Opel 91

3 André Gauch Ralt RT36-Alfa Romeo 70

4 Urs Rüttimann Dallara F394-Opel 65

5 Willi Sträuli Dallara F395/6 63

6 Bruno Huber Ralt RT35-Alfa Romeo 59

7 Mirco Schrepfer Dallara F393-Fiat 44

8 Michel Frey Dallara F393-Opel 44

9 Fabian Gysin Ralt RT34-Alfa Romeo 38

10 Marcel Heimberg Ralt RT36-Alfa Romeo 35

Best 4 results from 5 races plus and 1 slalom best 3 results of 5 hillclimbs with a minimum of 3 results.

Division B

1 André Gauch Ralt RT36-Alfa Romeo 130

2 Bruno Huber Ralt RT35-Alfa Romeo 114

3 Marcel Heimberg Ralt RT36-Alfa Romeo 76

4 Urs Hug Dallara F392-Alfa Romeo 72

5 Fabian Gysin Ralt RT34-Alfa Romeo 66

6 Kurt Dähler Dallara F392 49

Best 4 results from 5 races plus and 1 slalom best 3 results of 5 hillclimbs with a minimum of 3 results.

2000

Division A

1 Jo Zeller Dallara F399-Opel 167

2 Michel Frey Dallara F398 147

3 Marcel Heimberg Dallara F399-Opel 109

Division B

1 Andreas Bähler Dallara F394-Opel 180

2 Jürg Felix Dallara F393-Fiat 121

3 Bruno Huber Ralt RT35-Alfa Romeo 102

2001

1.Jo Zeller (CH), Dallara F399-Opel

(B Class)

1.Jürg Felix, Dallara F393-Fiat

2002

1. Jo Zeller (CH), Dallara F301-Opel

(B Class)

1. Bruno Huber, Ralt 93C-Alfa Romeo
