= East African Medical Vitals =

Ugandan medical supplies manufacturing company

Coordinates: 00°20′01″N 32°42′35″E

- Company type: Private
- Industry: Medical
- Founded: 2021; 5 years ago
- Headquarters: KIBP, Namanve, Mukono District, Uganda
- Key people: Ben Kavuya; Executive Chairman; Brian Kavuya; Managing Director
- Services: Manufacture of disposable medical supplies
- Number of employees: 200+ (2022)
- Website: Homepage

East African Medical Vitals Limited, commonly referred to as East African Medical Vitals (EAMV), is a manufacturer of consumable medical supplies in Uganda. It is reported to be the first company in Africa, that manufactures powder-free latex, medical gloves.

== Location ==
The headquarters and main factory of the company are located at Plot 1186 Kyaggwe, Block 113, in Namanve Industrial Park, Mukono City, Mukono District, Central Region, Uganda. The company premised are approximately 19 kilometres (12 mi), east of the center of Kampala, the national capital and largest city in that country. The geographical coordinates of the company premises are: 0°20'01.0"N, 32°42'35.0"E (Latitude:0.333611; Longitude:32.709722).

== Overview ==
EAMV was established by Ugandan entrepreneurs related by blood, Ben Kavuya and Brian Kavuya, at a cost of US$14.5 million. Of that, US$6.3 mullion (43.45 percent) was borrowed from the East African Development Bank (EADB) at an interest rate of 8 percent per annum. The Uganda Development Bank (UDB) was approached for a loan, but the application was denied.

The company products include powder-free latex examination gloves and powder-free sterile surgical gloves. Total annual production is 95 million gloves, as of December 2021. The glove pairs are either hand specific or ambidextrous. The company is also in preparation for the manufacture of male condoms.

As of March 2022, the company employed 200 staff, with the number expected to rise to over 1,000 by 2025, following expansion of the products line and expansion of work shifts.

== Ownership ==
The business is privately owned by members of the families of the original founders. ASIGMA Capital, a Ugandan private equity and investment firm is an equity partner in EAMV. The table below illustrates the shareholding in the company stock.

Shareholding In East African Medical Vitals Limited
Rank	Shareholder	Percentage Ownership
1	Ben Kavuya	
2	Brian Kavuya	
3	ASIGMA Capital	
4	Others	

== Governance ==
The executive chairman of the company is Ben Kavuya, a Ugandan. Brian Kavuya, another Ugandan national, is the managing director.

== See also ==
- Economy of Uganda
- Cipla Quality Chemical Industries Limited
