= Namanve Thermal Power Station =

Thermal power station in Uganda

Namanve Power Station
- Country: Uganda
- Location: Namanve
- Coordinates: 00°22′57″N 32°40′43″E
- Status: Operational
- Construction began: 2008
- Commission date: 2008
- Owner: Government of Uganda
- Operator: UEGCL
- Employees: 43

Thermal power station
- Primary fuel: Heavy fuel oil

Power generation
- Nameplate capacity: 50 MW

Namanve Power Station is a 50 MW heavy fuel oil-fired thermal power plant in Uganda. Sometimes the power station is referred to as Kiwanga Power Station.

== Location ==
The power plant is located in a locality known as Kiwanga, in Namanve in Mukono Municipality, Mukono District, in Central Uganda. This location is approximately 16 kilometres (9.9 mi), by road, east of Kampala, Uganda's capital and largest city.

The plant is located in Kampala Industrial and Business Park, an 894 acres (362 ha), business and industrial development area. This location is off of the Kampala-Jinja Highway, in North Namanve. The coordinates of the power plant are:0° 22' 57.00"N, +32° 40' 43"E (Latitude:0.3825; Longitude:32.6786).

== Overview ==
Namanve Power Station was owned and operated by Jacobsen Electricity Company (Uganda) Limited, a wholly owned subsidiary of Jacobsen Elektro, an independent Norwegian power production company. The plant cost US$92 million (€66 million) to build. Funding was provided by several sources including: (a) The Government of Norway, through a Norad grant (b) Nordea Bank of Norway (c) Stanbic Bank Uganda and (d) Jacobsen Elektro. The plant uses heavy fuel oil, a byproduct of petroleum distillation. Construction of Namanve Power Station started in January 2008 and was completed in July 2008. Power production began in August 2008 on a trial basis, with commercial production commencing in September 2008. The power station was commissioned in November 2008. Jacobsen Elektro, the company that built the station, also owned it, for the first 13 years of the power station's life.

The thermal power station was built under a build–own–operate–transfer (BOOT) model for 13 years. On 14 September 2021, Jacobsen Electro transferred ownership to Uganda Electricity Generation Company Limited, who now own, operate and maintain the power station. Full and complete handover of the power station to UEGCL was effected on 24 February 2022, after the government of Uganda had compensated Jacobsen for certain expenditures, including "the money spent on buying land, unused fuel and spare parts".

The power station has seven thermal generators each rated at 7.17 MW, for total installed capacity of 50.2 MW at maximum output. When there is no electricity emergency in the national grid, this power plant is operated at a baseline of 7 MW, to keep each of the seven generators running and ready. 43 full time employees operate the power station.

== See also ==
- Mukono District
- KIBP
- Uganda Power Stations
- Africa Power Stations
