= Kampala Industrial and Business Park =

Kampala Business and Industrial Park
- Map of Uganda showing the location of KBIP
- Coordinates: 00°20′35″N 32°41′55″E
- Country: Uganda
- District: Wakiso District
- Town: Kira Municipality

Area
  - Total: 8.9 km^{2} (3.4 sq mi)
- Time zone: UTC+3 (EAT)

The Kampala Industrial and Business Park (KIBP), also referred to as Kampala Business and Industrial Park or Kampala Industrial Park, is an industrial and business park in Uganda. The park was developed by the Uganda Investment Authority (UIA) as a central place where investors can locate factories, warehouses, distribution centers, and other business offices.

== Location ==
KIBP is located in Namanve, Kira Municipality, Wakiso District. This location is approximately 15 kilometres (9 mi), by road, east of the central business district of Kampala, Uganda's capital and largest city, on the Kampala-Jinja Highway. The coordinates of Kampala Business and Industrial Park are: 0°20'35.0"N, 32°41'55.0"E (Latitude:0.343050; Longitude:32.698600).

== Overview ==
The industrial park was created by act of parliament in 1997. An area measuring 894 hectares (2,210 acres), previously occupied by a national eucalyptus forest was de-gazetted for that purpose. Over 200 businesses acquired land and space on concessional terms to establish their businesses in the park. Roofings Limited, a manufacturer of galvanized iron bars, wires, and sheets, began production in September 2010 at a new factory called Roofings Rolling Mills Limited and located in the business park.

In August 2018, UIA announced that all the land in the industrial park had been allocated to 290 prospective investors, of whom 192 (66.2 percent) were Ugandan-based and 98 (33.8 percent) were foreign-based. By that time, the park's size had grown to 2,200 acres (3.4 mi^{2}), with 33 factories operating, including Century Bottling Company (the Coca-Cola franchisee in Uganda), Threeways Shipping Limited, and Leaf Tobacco & Commodities Limited. Another 87 companies were in the construction phase while 120 were in the feasibility study stage.

== Points of interest ==
The following businesses are located at Kampala Industrial and Business Park Namanve:

- Roofings Rolling Mills - Roofings' plant here employs more than 2,000 people.
- Hima Cement Limited - Uganda's second-largest cement manufacturer maintains a large warehouse and distribution center at this location.
- Export Trading Company Limited
- Victoria Seed Limited
- Kyagalanyi Coffee Limited, a leading coffee processor and exporting company in Uganda, maintains a warehouse in the business park and is constructing a roasting plant there.
- An ICT data center, owned by Raxio Data Limited, under construction by ROKO Construction Company. This project receives collaboration from Oracle Corporation.

== Recent developments ==
In January 2019, the government of Uganda formally applied for a loan amounting to £246 million (USh:1.116 trillion or US$326 million) from UK Export Finance for the development of a road network, sewerage disposal system, waste management network, high voltage electricity infrastructure, an IT network backbone and related developments.

In 2020, the UK Export Finance approved a loan facility worth £250 million (USh:1.175 trillion or US$331 million). The loan was availed to the Uganda Investment Authority (UIA) to carry out the above infrastructure developments, within a 42 months timeframe. As of December 2021, with 35 percent of the 42 months elapsed work was estimated at 17 percent compete.

== See also ==
- Seeta, Uganda
