= Kampala–Jinja Expressway =

Road in Uganda

Route information
- Length: 59 mi (95 km)
- History: Designation expected in 2027; Completion expected in 2033

Major junctions
- West end: Nakawa
- East end: New Jinja Bridge, Njeru

Location
- Country: Uganda

Highway system
- Roads in Uganda

The Kampala–Jinja Expressway, also known as the Jinja–Kampala Expressway, is a proposed four-lane toll highway in Uganda, linking Kampala, the capital and largest city of Uganda, with the city of Jinja in the Eastern Region of Uganda.

== Location ==
The expressway will start at Nakawa, a neighborhood in Nakawa Division in the eastern part of Kampala. It is planned to go through Namanve and Mukono in Mukono District, and end at the New Jinja Bridge in Njeru. The entire expressway will be a four-lane, dual carriageway, with limited access.

== Overview ==
The current Kampala-Jinja Highway, (highway A109 on the map), forms part of the Northern Corridor of the Trans-Africa Highway, linking the Indian Ocean port of Mombasa, Kenya with the Atlantic Ocean port of Matadi, Democratic Republic of the Congo (DRC). The section of A109 between Jinja and Kampala is the busiest and most congested road in Uganda. It is the main import/export route for land-locked Uganda, Rwanda, Burundi, and eastern DRC. The 77 kilometres (48 mi) expressway will pass to the south of the existing Kampala–Jinja Highway and is planned as a toll-road.

In 2010, the Ugandan government engaged the World Bank as transaction adviser. They hired Integrated Transport Planning (ITP), a United Kingdom-based transportation consulting firm, to conduct feasibility studies and road design. A core investor will be identified who will build, own, and operate the toll road for 25 years from the date of commissioning. This public-private-partnership (PPP) arrangement will be used on three other planned expressways, leading in and out of the nation's capital. Trademark East Africa, an affiliate of ITP, will provide oversight support to the Uganda National Roads Authority (UNRA) in the management of PPP preparation, procurement, and implementation.

== History ==
The expressway will be a toll-road, with vehicles that use it needing fittings with electronic billing devices. The construction contract will be awarded once the core investor in the toll road is identified and approved.

The exact cost of the project has not been finalized. Estimates have varied from UGX:800 billion to a high of UGX:5.5 trillion (US$1.5 billion).

In June 2014, the UNRA selected the International Finance Corporation as lead transaction advisor to assess the potential to develop the 77 kilometres (48 mi) expressway on a public private partnership basis. Spea Engineering was hired to assist UNRA select one or more investors to design, build, finance, and operate the expressway. In July 2014 at the Financing Summit for Africa's Infrastructure that took place in Dakar, Senegal, the Common Market for Eastern and Southern Africa (COMESA) identified the expressway as a priority project, one of the six infrastructure projects to be developed before 2020. COMESA allocated US$74 million in funding towards its development.

== Developments ==
In June 2016, the government of France, through the French Development Agency (AFD), agreed to lend €180 million (Shs667 billion) to the Ugandan government, towards the construction of this toll expressway. Construction was planned to begin in 2017.

In May 2018, the Uganda National Roads Authority (UNRA), advertised for bids from aspiring developers to design, build, finance, operate and later transfer the project back to the government after recovering their investment in the proposed 95 kilometres (59 mi), US$1 billion road project. The African Development Bank has also offered funding for this project.

In September 2018, UNRA revealed that eight firms had bid to be considered in awarding of the contract for the construction of this highway and the connecting Kampala Southern Bypass Highway. The consortia vying for the contract include (1) China Communications Construction Company & China First Highway Engineering Company Limited (2) A consortium of French and Portuguese firms KJ Connect, Vinci Concessions & Mota-Engil (3) A consortium of Austria & Turkish firms, Strabag & IC Ictas (4) Enkula Expressway Consortium from South Africa (5) A consortium of Chang Chyi Enterprise Company Limited (CCECL) & CRCCIG from China (6) Shapoorji Pacconji Group from India (7) Tecnasol Luisa Goncal from Portugal and (8) South Korean and Chinese firms, comprising the CCKS Consortium.

In November 2021, the Ministry of Works and Transport, whittled the potential contractor list down to four consortia. These are (a) KJ Connect Consortium from France and Portugal (b) CCCC–CFHEC Consortium from China (c) STRABAG/ICTAS/EGIS/AIF3/STOA Consortium from Austria, Germany, Poland, Turkey and France and (d) CCKS Consortium from China and South Korea.

As of February 2024, the Ugandan government and the funders, donors and advisors were still negotiating the terms of the concession agreement under the "design, build, finance, operate, and transfer (DBFOT) model". The concession duration will be 30 years, after which the asset will revert to the Ugandan government.

== Financing ==
In November 2018, the total project cost of the Kampala-Jinja Expressway and the Kampala Southern Bypass Highway was quoted at US$1.55 billion. The funds will be raised through a public private partnership (PPP) arrangement. The same source reported that the African Development Bank had approved US$229.5 million in sovereign loans to go towards the development of this transportation system.

As of March 2020, the financing of this expressway and the associated Kampala Southern Bypass Highway, are as illustrated in the table below:

Combined Kampala–Jinja Expressway & Kampala Southern Bypass Highway Funding
Rank	Development Partner	Contribution in US$	UGX Equivalent	Percentage	Notes
1	African Development Bank	229.5 million	828.00 billion	15.50	Loan
2	European Union	106.00 million	369.00 billion	7.16	Grant
3	French Development Agency	90.00 million	324.00	6.08	Loan
4	Government of Uganda	338.11 million	1,230 billion	22.84	Equity
5	Private Investors	716.39 million	2,606 billion	48.40	Investment
	Total	1,480 million	5,480 billion	100.00	

*Note: Totals are slightly off due to rounding.

In March 2021, the African Development Bank, represented by Augustine Kpehe Ngafuan, their country representative in Uganda and the government of Uganda, represented by Matia Kasaija, the then Finance Minister, signed loan documents for a loan worth US$229.5 million to support the construction of the 18 kilometres (11 mi) Kampala Southern Bypass Highway and the 35 kilometres (22 mi) Kampala to Namagunga section of the main expressway. The remaining expressway from Namagunga to Jinja is mainly in rural country and measures approximately 41 kilometres (25 mi). That section will be funded by other means, through a public-private partnership arrangement.

In September 2026, the NSSF Uganda expressed the desire and willingness to join the funding entities of this transport infrastructure.

== Construction ==
As of April 2021, construction is expected to commence in 2022 and last five years. The Uganda National Roads Authority (UNRA), estimates that approximately 1,500 jobs will be created during the construction phase, while an estimated 250 permanent jobs will be required when the expressway becomes operative.

== Other considerations ==
Among the benefits expected out of the road, one of the most important is the anticipated time savings. As of July 2024, motor vehicles traversing the Kampala-Jinja Highway spend an average of two hours traveling that 80 kilometres (50 mi). The new toll highway is expected to reduce that time to under one hour.

== See also ==
- New Jinja Bridge
