= Kyetume =

- Location in Uganda
- Coordinates: 00°19′10″N 32°46′10″E
- Country: Uganda
- Region: Central Region of Uganda
- District: Mukono District
- Municipality: Mukono
- Elevation: 3,750 ft (1,143 m)

Kyetume is a township in Mukono District in the Central Region of Uganda.

== Location ==
Kyetume is located within the town of Mukono (2014 population: 161,996), the headquarters of and largest urban center in the district. Kyetume is about 5 kilometres (3 mi) south of Mukono's central business district. The coordinates of Kyetume are 0°19'10.0"N, 32°46'10.0"E (Latitude:0.319444; Longitude:32.769444).

== Points of interest ==
The following points of interest are located in Kyetume, or near its borders:

- Kyetume Railway Station
- Kyetume Roman Catholic Church
- Kyetume Seventh-Day Adventist Church
- Kyetume Church of Uganda
- Mukono–Kyetume–Katosi–Nyenga Road, passing through the middle of the township.

== Gender Based Violence Prevention ==
Kyetume has set up a community based health care service in order to combat issues such as gender based violence.

In Uganda, gender based violence is one of the leading causes of female injury and due to the larger number of men in power most women are seen as powerless.

To combat this the Kytume community-based health care service has started to raise awareness for such violence.

== See also ==
- List of cities and towns in Uganda
- List of roads in Uganda
