= List of bridges in Uganda =

== Major bridges ==
	Name	Span	Length	Type	Carries Crosses	Opened	Location	Region	Ref.
1	Source of the Nile Bridge	290 m (950 ft)	525 m (1,722 ft)	Cable-stayed; Concrete box girder deck	Kampala–Jinja Expressway; White Nile	2018	Njeru - Jinja; 0°26′19.3″N 33°11′17.1″E	Central Region; Eastern Region	

== See also ==
- Transport in Uganda
- Rail transport in Uganda
