= Namyoya Forest Reserve =

Forest reserve in Mukono District, Uganda

- Location within Uganda

Geography
- Location: Mukono District Uganda
- Coordinates: 0°24′N 32°43′E
- Elevation: 1,147 m (3,763 ft)
- Area: 389 ha (960 acres)

Administration
- Governing body: National Forestry Authority (NFA)
- Website: www.nfa.org.ug

Namyoya Forest Reserve is a protected area located in Mukono District, Central Uganda which was established colonial era. The forest reserve was officially designated for conservation purposes and functions as an important ecological area within the surrounding region.

== Location and geography ==
Namyoya Forest Reserve is located near Seeta, Ngeribalya and Jjogo in Mukono District. It covers an area of approximately 389 hectares and is situated at an elevation of 1,147 meters above sea level. The coordinates for the reserve are approximately 0.40097°N latitude and 32.71723°E longitude.

== Biodiversity ==
The forest reserve, located within the region, harbors a diverse array of plant and animal species, significantly contributing to the overall biodiversity of the area. It fulfills a vital role within the local ecosystem, acting as a catchment area for the Namyoya River. The forest's ecosystem offers essential services, such as carbon sequestration, water regulation, and soil conservation.

== Conservation challenges ==
Namyoya Forest Reserve is confronted with various conservation challenges, mainly stemming from encroachment and illegal activities. There have been instances where individuals have felled trees and built makeshift dwellings within the reserve, asserting ownership of the land. These actions have contributed to the degradation of the forest area, necessitating intervention from the National Forestry Authority (NFA) to restore and protect the reserve.

== Restoration efforts ==
Local leaders and environmentalists in Mukono District have launched campaigns to restore the degraded sections of Namyoya Forest Reserve. Efforts include mobilizing indigenous tree seedlings for reforestation and engaging the local community in conservation activities. These initiatives aim to revive the forest's health and ensure its sustainability for future generations.
