= Mukono–Kyetume–Katosi–Nyenga Road =

Road in Central Region, Uganda

Coordinates: 00°14′40″N 32°54′43″E

Route information
- Length: 46 mi (74 km)
- History: Designated in 2014; Completed in 2019

Major junctions
- West end: Mukono
- Kisoga
- East end: Nyenga

Location
- Country: Uganda

Highway system
- Roads in Uganda

The Mukono–Kyetume–Katosi–Nyenga Road is a road in the Central Region of Uganda, connecting the towns of Mukono, Kyetume and Katosi in Mukono District to Nkokonjeru and Nyenga in Buikwe District.

== Location ==
The road starts at Mukono with a population of 161,996 in 2014, located approximately 31 kilometres (19 mi), by road east of Kampala, the capital city of Uganda. The road continues through Kyetume and Kisoga; one branch continues south to Katosi on the northern shores of Lake Victoria, and another branch runs east, through Nkokonjeru and Buikwe, to end at Nyenga in Buikwe District. The total length of the road is approximately 74 kilometres (46 mi).

== Overview ==
This road, which was gravel-surfaced until 2014, had been a concern of the Ugandan government since the National Resistance Movement came to power in 1986. In 1996, the Ugandan president promised to find resources within government to tarmac the road. For many years, during the reading of the national budget, this road has been earmarked for widening and upgrading to a tarmac surface.

In 2011 after an international bidding process, Eutaw Construction Limited, allegedly a subsidiary of Eutaw Construction Inc., a Mississippi-based entity, presented the winning bid of USh165 billion (approx.:US$66 million in 2011 money). The work would be supervised by Arab Consulting Engineers from Egypt.

On 7 July 2014, President Yoweri Museveni officially commissioned the beginning of construction of the road, with work projected to last three years.

== Controversy ==
The first sign of trouble was when it was discovered that the company carrying out the road work was not Eutaw Construction Limited (EUTAW), which had won the bid, but Chongqing International Construction Corporation (CICO), which has Chinese roots. Although CICO is a well-known company in Uganda, where it has built a number of roads, it had been knocked out of the bidding for this road. The work itself was progressing well, but subcontracting without the consent of UNRA was expressly forbidden by the contract agreement between EUTAW and UNRA. Also, if subcontracting is approved, it cannot exceed 30 percent of the work load. In this case, the entire contract had been subcontracted.

Then it came to light that EUTAW did not exist; it was a "briefcase" company. Uganda's Inspector General of Government (IGG) intervened and halted CICO from proceeding with the work. Uganda's attorney general at the time, Peter Nyombi, opined that the IGG did not know what she was doing, recommending that CICO be allowed to continue with the work. Accusations and finger-pointing among government bureaucrats ensued.

Investigations by the Uganda Police Force and the IGG are continuing. During the process, the following had taken place as of April 2015:

- Litigation was initiated against Eutaw Construction Limited in Uganda.
- CICO was stopped from working further on the road.
- The managing director, the chief legal officer, the chief planning officer, and the chief finance officer at the UNRA were suspended while the investigations continued.
- During the cabinet reshuffle of 1 March 2015, Attorney General Nyombi was dropped from the cabinet and was replaced by his former deputy Fred Ruhindi.
- While kept in the cabinet in the 1 March 2015 reshuffle, former Minister of Works and Transport Abraham Byandala was removed from the ministry and replaced by his former deputy, John Byabagambi. Byandala was named the new Minister without Portfolio.

The road contract was re-tendered, with CICO excluded from the process. A new consortium, composed of Solel Boneh International and Reynolds Construction Company emerged as the best bidder. Work resumed, starting where CICO left off in September 2014. The new contract price was UGX:179 billion to complete the work and cover additional roads not originally included in the cancelled EUTAW contract. New roads include the tarmacking of the Nyenga-Njeru road, measuring approximately 10 kilometres (6.2 mi) to connect with the New Jinja Bridge and relieve the main Kampala-Jinja Highway. Other roads include access roads to the Katosi landing site and an access road to the Buikwe District offices at Buikwe.

== See also ==
- List of roads in Uganda
