= Nyanzi =

Nyanzi is a surname. Notable people with this surname include:

- Stella Nyanzi
- Fred Nyanzi Ssentamu
- Vincent Nyanzi
