= Roofings Group =

Ugandan manufacturing company

Coordinates: 00°14′28″N 32°33′26″E

- Company type: Private
- Industry: Construction materials
- Founded: 2004
- Headquarters: Lubowa, Uganda
- Key people: Sikander Lalani chairman and chief executive officer
- Services: Manufacture of steel & polyvinyl chloride pipes
- Number of employees: 3,000+ (2016)
- Website: Homepage

Roofings Group, often referred to simply as Roofings, is the largest manufacturer of steel construction materials in Uganda, with installed production capacity of 72,000 metric tonnes annually.

== Location ==
The headquarters of the group and two of its manufacturing companies and factories are located on 39 acres (16 ha) at Lubowa, Wakiso District, on the Kampala-Entebbe road, approximately 10 kilometres (6.2 mi) south of Kampala, the capital and largest city of Uganda.

New premises were acquired at the Kampala Industrial and Business Park at Namanve, also in Wakiso District, to house new steel mills belonging to Roofings' subsidiary company, Roofings Rolling Mills Limited (RRM), the third company in the conglomerate. It is expected that once the new facilities are brought on-line, employment at Roofings Limited and RRM will triple from the present 1,000 to about 3,000. The new factories will be built and operated in collaboration with two Japanese steel companies, Yodogawa Steel Works and Fujiden International. The Japanese firms will, in turn, take an equity position in RRM. More recently, the group has opened a polyvinyl chloride pipes and building materials factory at Lubowa, the Roofings Polypipes.

In addition to the factories and offices at Lubowa and Namanve, the company maintains warehouses and attached sales offices at the following locations:

1. Arua Park Superstore 1 - 13-13A Wilson Road, Kampala
2. Nakasero Booking Office 2 - 3 Market Street, Nakasero, Kampala
3. Industrial Area Superstore 3 - 2-3 Channel Lane and 5th Street, Industrial Area, Kampala
4. Jinja Superstore 4 - 4-6 Spire Road, Jinja
5. Gulu Superstore 6 - Latek Odong Road, Downtown Gulu, Gulu
6. Banda Superstore 7 - Mukabya Road, Banda, Kampala
7. Roofings Manufacturing Limited - Kigali, Rwanda

== History ==
The company was established in 1994 following licensing facilitated by the Uganda Investment Authority. The company in 2008 was producing about 100,000 metric tonnes of steel annually. In February 2011, Roofings secured funding from the International Finance Corporation, an arm of the World Bank, totaling US$25 million for expansion of production facilities. This was in addition to a syndicated loan of US$64 million obtained from a consortium of six Ugandan commercial banks obtained in December 2010 for the same purpose. When all of the planned expansion is completed, the company's exports will more than double to over US$130 million annually. The company's products are marketed to the six member countries of the East African Community and to the neighboring Democratic Republic of the Congo.

== Ownership ==
As of March 2016, the shares of the three companies that comprise the Group were owned as outlined below:

1. Roofings Limited: wholly owned by Sikander Lalani and his family.
2. Roofings Rolling Mills: 90 percent owned by Roofings Limited and 10 percent owned by Yodogawa Steel Works Limited of Japan. This facility cost US$170 million to establish in 2014.
3. Roofings Polypipes & Irrigation Systems Limited: wholly owned subsidiary of Roofings Limited.

== Governance ==
The Roofings board of directors has seven members, all of whom are executives in the company. Sikander Lalani serves as the chairman of the board and chief executive officer. The CEO is assisted by 31 senior managers who are responsible for running the day-to-day affairs of the company.

== Recent developments ==
In September 2016, the Group received government authorization to supply the country’s infrastructure projects, including the 600 megawatt Karuma Hydroelectric Power Station and the 183 megawatt Isimba Hydroelectric Power Station, which are under construction.

== See also ==
- Uganda Investment Authority
- Economy of Uganda
