= Oliver Wonekha =

Ugandan politician

- Born: 1951 (age 74–75); Bududa District, Uganda
- Citizenship: Uganda
- Education: Makerere University (Bachelor of Science) (Postgraduate Diploma in Education)
- Occupations: Diplomat and politician
- Years active: 1971–present
- Title: Uganda's Ambassador to the People's Republic of China

Oliver Wonekha is a Ugandan politician and diplomat, who serves as Uganda's Ambassador to the People's Republic of China, since 2022. She previously served as the country's Ambassador to the United States of America, from 2013, until 2017 and thereafter as Uganda's High Commissioner to the Republic Of Rwanda between 2017 and 2022.

== Background and education ==
Wonekha was born in present-day Bududa District, c. 1951. She holds a Bachelor of Science degree from Makerere University, in Kampala, Uganda's capital. She also holds a Postgraduate Diploma in Education, also from Makerere.

== Work experience ==
She worked in the coffee sector for 30 years, starting c. 1971, before she entered politics. She worked at the now defunct Coffee Marketing Board and later for the privately owned Kyagalanyi Coffee Limited.

== Political career ==
In 2011, Wonekha entered Uganda's elective politics by contesting the Mbale District Women's Constituency, in the Ugandan parliament. She won and served in that capacity during the eighth parliament (2001–2006). In 2006, she contested the Bududa District Women's Constituency, on the ruling National Resistance Movement political party. She won and served in that capacity in the 9th parliament (2006–2011). During the 2011 election cycle, she lost her seat. Following her loss in the Ugandan parliament, she unsuccessfully contested for the East African Legislative Assembly.

== Diplomatic career ==
In 2013, she was named Uganda's Ambassador to the United States, where she presented her credentials to President Barack Obama on 22 July 2013. In that capacity, she was also concurrently accredited to Argentina, Bolivia, Brazil, Chile, Colombia, Ecuador, Jamaica, Mexico, Paraguay, Peru, Trinidad and Tobago, Uruguay, and Venezuela on a non-residential basis. In January 2017, she was transferred to Rwanda, as Uganda's ambassador to that country, replacing Richard Kabonero who was transferred to the Republic of Tanzania. She presented her credentials to President Paul Kagame, on 11 October 2017. In 2022 she assumed her current post as Uganda's Ambassador to China

== See also ==
- Districts of Uganda
- East African Community
- Perezi Kamunanwire
- Edith Sempala
- Ugandan Americans
- Mull Katende
