= Henry Hanlon =

English Roman Catholic archbishop (1862–1937)

The Most Reverend Henry Hanlon
- Vicar Apostolic of Upper Nile District
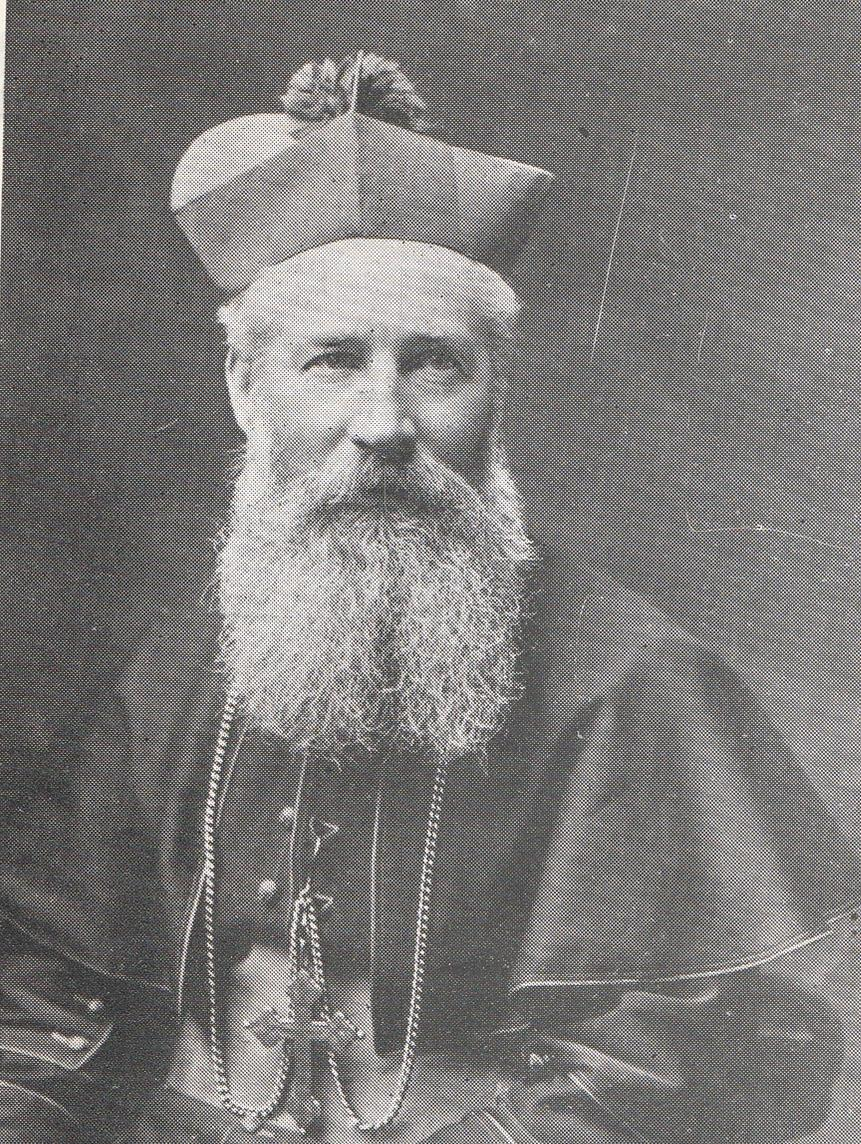
- Archbishop Hanlon
- Diocese: Roman Catholic Archdiocese of Tororo
- Appointed: 1894
- Other post: Titular Archbishop of Teos

Orders
- Ordination: 21 September 1889
- Consecration: 17 July 1894

Personal details
- Born: Henry Hanlon; 13 January 1862 Manchester, Lancashire, England
- Died: 18 August 1937 (aged 75) Formby, Lancashire, England
- Denomination: Roman Catholic
- Parents: Henry and Sarah Hanlon

Archbishop Dr Henry Hanlon MHM (13 January 1862 – 18 August 1937), was an English Roman Catholic bishop, belonging to the order of the Mill Hill Missionaries.

== Background and education ==
Hanlon was born on 13 January 1862 in Manchester, the son of Henry Hanlon, a warehouse packer, and his wife Sarah. He was educated at St Augustine's Roman Catholic School, Manchester. Prior to joining the priesthood he trained as a cabinet maker. Having decided to train as a priest, he attended the Missionary School at Kelvedon, Essex, then St Joseph's College, Mill Hill. He was ordained Priest on 21 September 1889 for the Mill Hill Missionaries.

== Apostolic mission ==
Hanlon travelled to Northern India, where he served until 1894 when he was recalled to Rome to be appointed the first Vicar Apostolic of Upper Nile District of the Roman Catholic Archdiocese of Tororo. He was appointed Archbishop on 17 July 1894 and was consecrated (ordained) on 25 November 1894, in Rome, taking the title of Titular Archbishop of Teos.

He was then sent to lead the first band of four Mill Hill missionaries into the African interior, where they arrived in Kampala on 26 September 1895, having walked from Mombasa.

Upon arrival Bishop Hanlon and his missionaries were received by Kabaka Mwanga II, who offered them land on Nsambya Hill where they established their mission station. As of June 2018, the site is occupied by St Peter's Catholic Church, Nsambya. Hanlon founded new parishes at Budaka and Masaba in 1901 and at Nyondo in 1906. In 1903 he brought a congregation of the Fransciscan Sisters of St Joseph from Manchester to Kampala where they established a school, St. Peter's School Nsambya, and a hospital, St. Francis Hospital Nsambya, for the local district. He continued in that position until 17 November 1911 when he resigned, becoming the Vicar Apostolic Emeritus.

Bishop Hanlon is credited with he establishment of Namilyango College, an all-boys, residential, Catholic boarding school, founded in March 1902, at Namilyango, approximately 20 kilometres (12 mi), east of Kampala, Uganda's capital and largest city. One of the dormitories at the college, is named after him.

== In retirement ==
Bishop Hanlon returned to England and began Parish work in his native Diocese of Salford. In 1915 he became Missionary Rector at the Church of St Alban, Blackburn where he would remain until ill health forced his retirement in 1934. Along with Auxiliary Bishop John Vaughan, Bishop Hanlon took on many episcopal duties with the diocese to assist Bishop Louis Casartelli, who suffered from ill health through much of his episcopate. Bishop Henry Hanlon died in 1937 at the age of 75.
