= Edith Sempala =

Ugandan civil engineer, civil servant, diplomat and political activist

- Born: 28 December 1953 (age 72); Namutamba, Uganda
- Citizenship: Ugandan
- Education: Peoples' Friendship University of Russia (BSc in Civil Engineering) (MSc in Civil Engineering)
- Occupations: Engineer & Diplomat
- Years active: 1979 – present
- Known for: Diplomatic service
- Title: Senior Adviser; World Bank

Edith Grace Sempala or Ssempala (née Edith Bafakulera), is a Ugandan civil engineer, civil servant, diplomat and political activist, who has served as Director and Senior Adviser at the World Bank since 2008. She previously served as Uganda's representative to the Nordic countries, the United States, the African Union, Ethiopia and Djibouti.

== Background and education ==
She was born on 28 December 1953 in Namutamba, in modern-day Mityana District, in the Central Region of Uganda. She attended Namutamba Demonstration School for her elementary education. She attended Gayaza High School for her O-Level studies and went to Nabumali High School for her A-Level schooling. In 1973, she entered Peoples' Friendship University of Russia, then known as Lumumba University, where she graduated with a Bachelor of Science and a Master of Science in Civil Engineering, completing her studies in 1979.

== Career ==
Following her studies in the then Soviet Union, she spent the next seven years (1979 to 1986), in Sweden as a refugee. In 1986, following the change of government in Kampala, she was named Uganda's ambassador to the Nordic countries, based in Copenhagen, Denmark, serving in that capacity for 10 years. In 1996, she was named Uganda's ambassador to the United States, based in Washington, D.C. She served in that capacity for another 10 years. In 2006, she was appointed Uganda's ambassador to the African Union, based in Addis Ababa, Ethiopia. She concurrently served as Uganda's representative to Ethiopia and Djibouti. She served in this capacity from 2006 until 2008. In 2008, she joined the World Bank as Director and Senior Adviser, International Affairs, Office of the World Bank's vice-president for External Affairs. In 2015, she was named by the Secretary-General of the United Nations to serve on the Advisory Group of Experts on Review of Peacebuilding Architecture.

== Personal ==
Edith Grace Sempala is married to Patrick Ssempala, although they have been separated since 1996 and she has been seeking a divorce. Edith is a mother of three children.

== See also ==
- Mityana District
- List of political parties in Uganda
- Amama Mbabazi
- Perezi Kamunanwire
- Oliver Wonekha
