= Bukenya =

Bukenya is an Ugandan surname. Notable people with the surname include:

- Austin Bukenya (born 1944), Ugandan poet, playwright, novelist, and academic
- Gilbert Bukenya (born 1949), Ugandan politician and physician
- Ivan Bukenya (born 1981), Ugandan football player
