= Namanve =

- Location in Uganda
- Coordinates: 00°21′27″N 32°41′39″E
- Country: Uganda
- District: Wakiso District
- City: Kira, Uganda
- County: Kyaddondo
- Constituency: Kyaddondo East

Government
  - MP: Ibrahim Semujju Nganda
- Elevation: 3,870 ft (1,180 m)

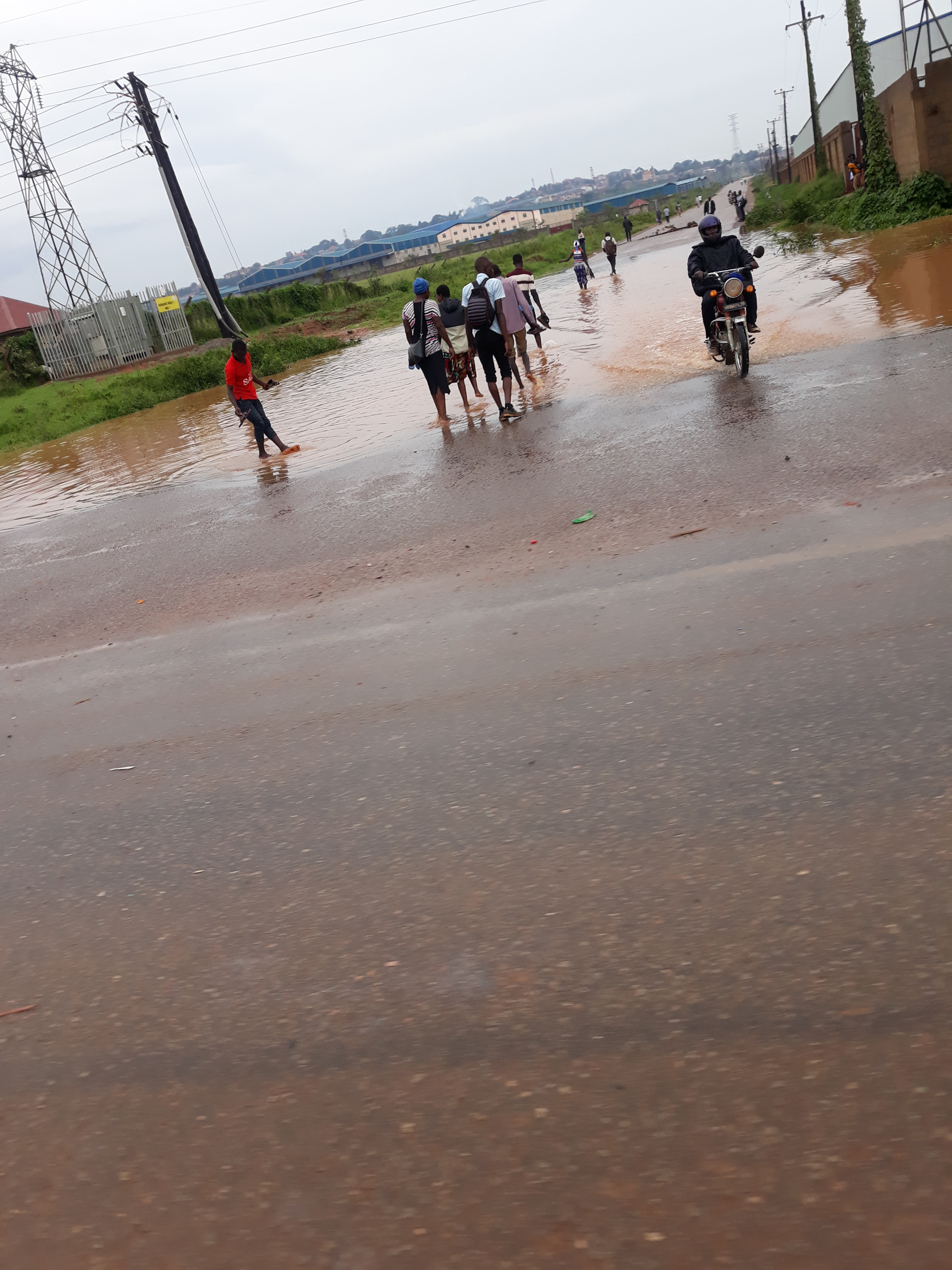
Flooded road at Namanve Industrial Park (March 2020)

Namanve is an area in the Central Region of Uganda. The larger portion of Namanve lies in Kira Municipality, in Wakiso District with portions located in Mukono Municipality, in Mukono District.

== Location ==
Namanve lies in Bweyogerere Ward, in southeastern Kira Municipality, in Wakiso District, Central Uganda. It is located approximately 14 kilometres (9 mi), by road, east of downtown Kampala, Uganda's capital and largest city. Namanve is bordered by Seeta to the east, Namilyango to the southeast, Lake Victoria to the south, Kirinnya to the southwest and Bweyogerere to the west and northwest. Portions of Namanve lie within the boundaries of Mukono Town Council. The geographical coordinates of Namanve are:0°21'27.0"N, 32°41'39.0"E (Latitude:0.357500; Longitude:32.694167).

== Points of interest ==
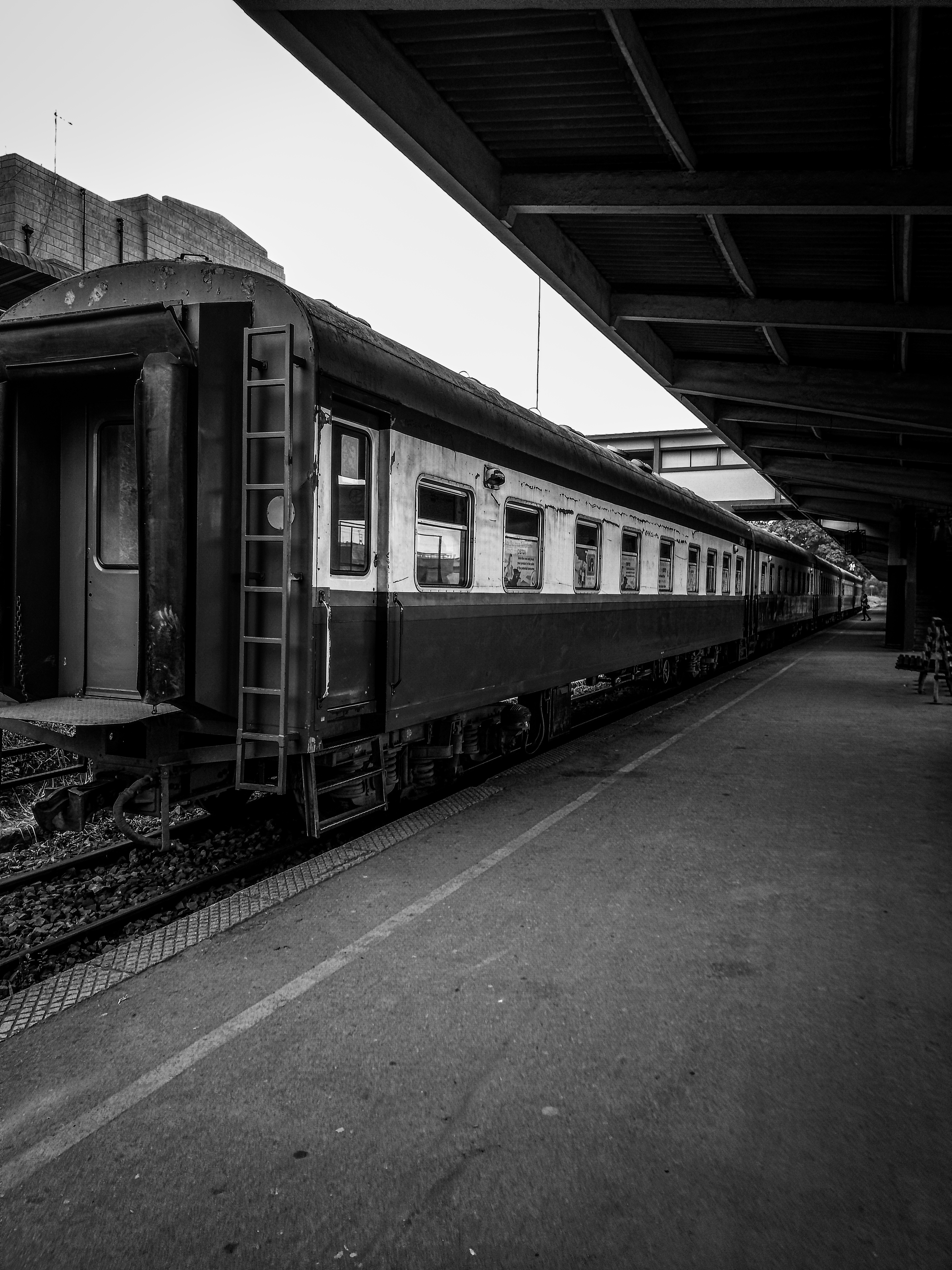
Train to Namanve leaving Kampala Railway Station

The following points of interest are in Namanve or close to its borders:

1. The Kampala-Jinja Highway passes through Namanve in an east-west direction, dividing it into North Namanve and South Namanve.

2. Kampala Industrial and Business Park is a 2,209 acres (894ha/8.9sqkm) development to house factories and other industries, located in South Namanve.

3. Namanve Coca-Cola Bottling Plant is one of the two bottling plants in Uganda owned by Coca-Cola International, in North Namanve

4. Namanve Power Station is owned by Jacobsen Electro. The 50 MW thermal power station is located north of the Kampala Industrial and Business Park, in a neighborhood known as Kiwanga.

5. Rwenzori Mineral Water Bottling Company is located in neighboring Seeta, Uganda

6. Red Pepper Publishing Company: Their printing press is in neighboring Seeta, Uganda

7. Namanve Forest Reserve: Most of the reserve has been demolished to pave way for Kampala Business and Industrial Park:

8. Namanve Railway Station is on the Uganda Railways System, administered by Rift Valley Railways.

== See also ==
- Kampala Industrial Park
- Bweyogerere
- Kireka
- Seeta
- Mukono
- Kira Town
- Wakiso District
- Central Uganda
