= Namilyango =

- Location in Uganda
- Coordinates: 00°20′21″N 32°43′05″E
- Country: Uganda
- Region: Central Region
- District: Mukono District
- Elevation: 4,000 ft (1,220 m)

Namilyango is a hill in Mukono District in south-central Uganda. The hill rises 1,220 metres (4,000 ft) above sea level. The name "Namilyango" is also applied to the village that occupies the hill and the schools and churches that are located there.

== Location ==
Namilyango is located approximately 20 kilometres (12 mi), by road, east of Kampala, Uganda's capital and largest city. Its location is approximately 7 kilometres (4.3 mi), by road, southwest of Mukono, the district headquarters, and about 3.2 kilometres (2.0 mi), by road, south of the township of Seeta. The coordinates of Namilyango are:0°20'21.0"N, 32°43'05.0"E (Latitude:0.339167; Longitude:32.718056).

== History ==
Little is known about the history of Namilyango prior to the 20th century. Around 1900, the Mill Hill Missionaries settled on the hill and begun to build Namilyango College, a prestigious middle and high school, intended originally to educate the sons of chiefs. The college opened in 1902, the first boys boarding school in Uganda.

In 1907, the Headmaster of Namilyango College was given additional responsibilities as Parish Priest of the newly created Namilyango Catholic Parish. However, that arrangement lasted only until 1912, when the parish was separated from the college.

In 1932, the Franciscan Sisters, under the leadership of Mother Kevin from Ireland, after a request by Bishop Campling the then Prelate of Upper Nile Vicariate, opened Namilyango Boys' Junior School. The primary aim of the new school was to establish a special preparatory school which would “feed” students to Namilyango College and other educational institutions. Today Namilyango Junior Boys’ School sends over forty students to Namilyango College annually on merit for secondary education.

== Points of interest ==
The following points of interest lie on Namilyango Hill include:

- Namilyango College - A prestigious, all-boys, boarding, secondary school (Grades 8 -13)
- Namilyango Junior Boys' School - A private, all-boys, boarding, primary school (Grades 1 - 8)
- Namilyango Primary School - A public, non-residential, mixed primary school (Grades 1 - 8)
- Namilyango Senior Secondary School - A public non-residential, mixed secondary school (Grades 8 - 11)
- Namilyango Parish Church - A place of worship affiliated with the Catholic Church, administered by the Roman Catholic Archdiocese of Kampala.

== See also ==
- Mukono District
- Namilyango College
- Central Region, Uganda
