= Seeta, Uganda =

Seeta
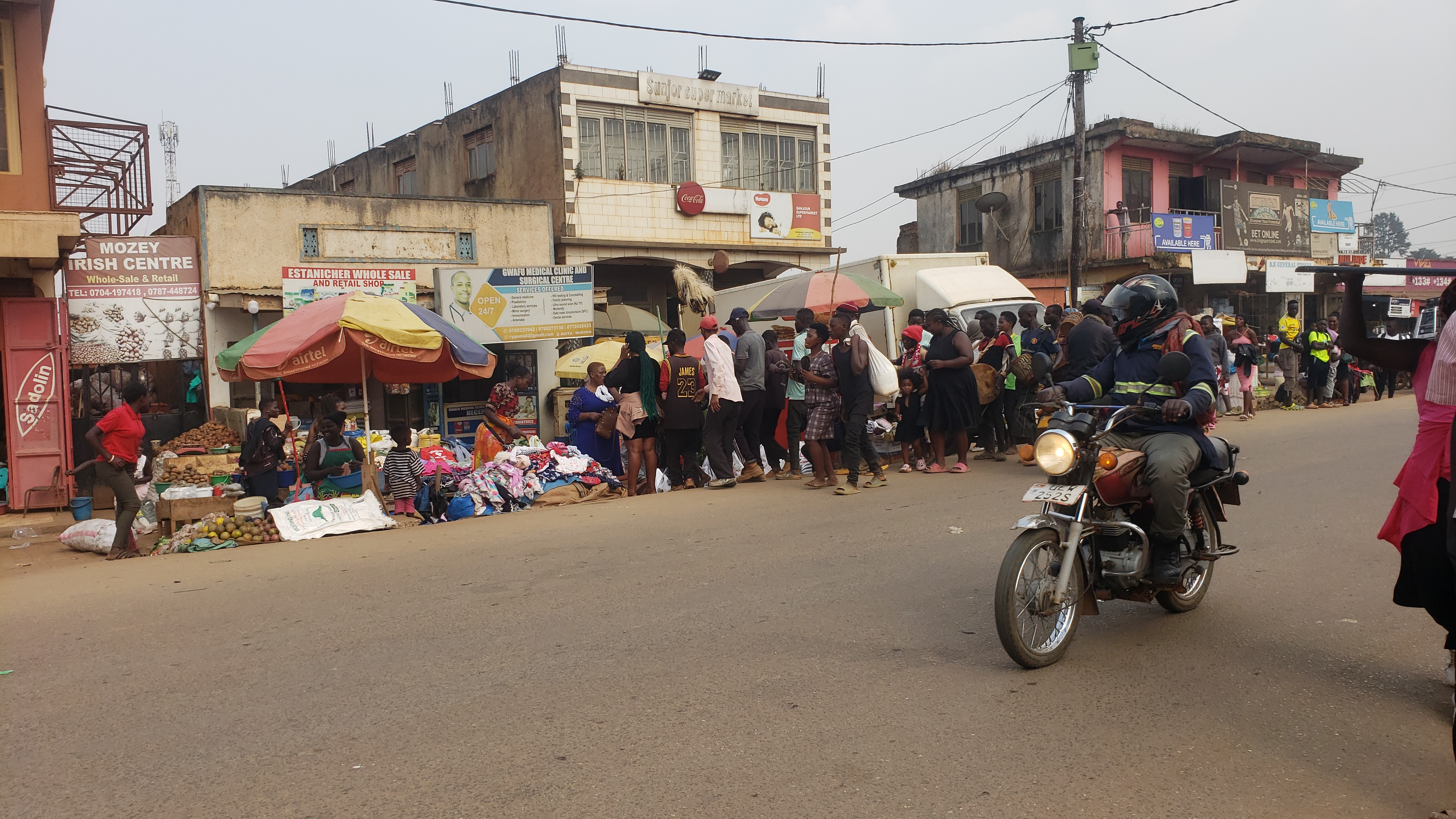
- Seeta

- Map of Uganda showing the location of Seeta.
- Coordinates: 00°22′00″N 32°42′45″E
- Country: Uganda
- District: Mukono District
- Elevation: 1,180 m (3,870 ft)
- Time zone: UTC+3 (EAT)

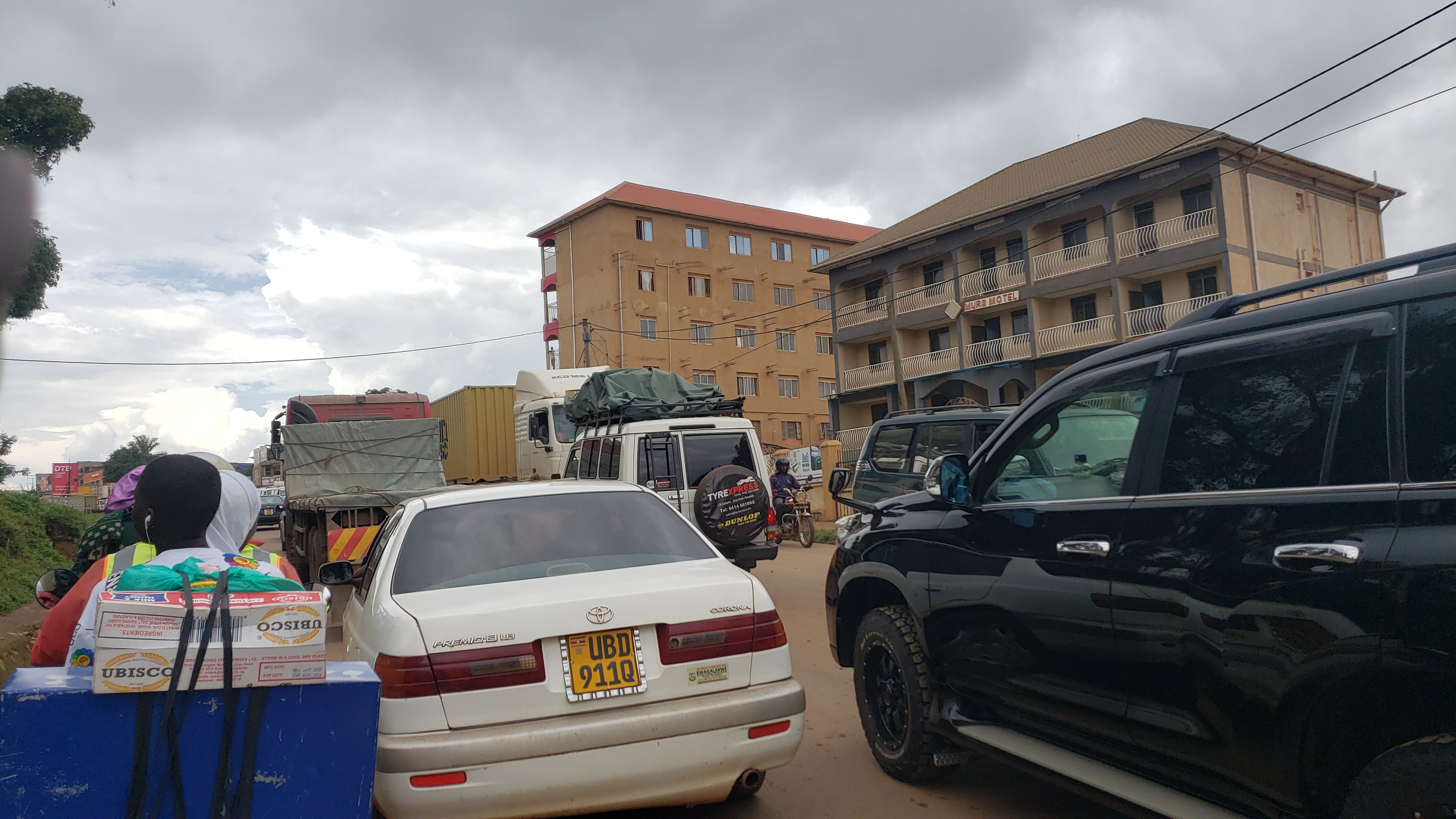
Jam in seeta Mukono central Uganda

Seeta, sometimes wrongly spelled as Seta, is a township in Uganda.

== Location ==
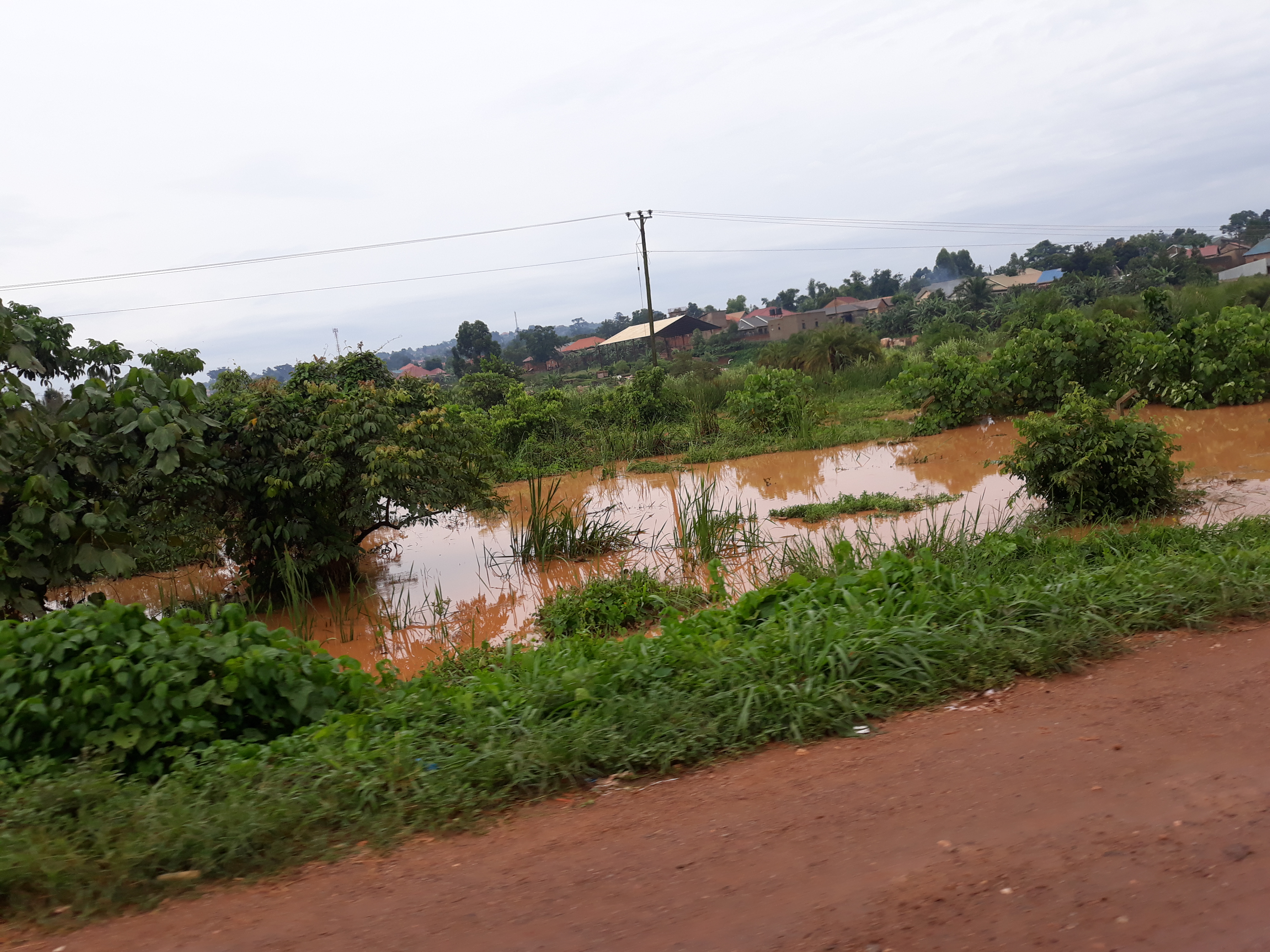
Wetland flooded by heavy rains in Seeta (A-109)

Seeta is located inside Mukono Town and is situated on the main highway (A-109) between Kampala and Jinja, on the Kampala-Jinja Highway. It is approximately 18 kilometres (11 mi) east from Kampala by road, which is Uganda's capital and largest city. This location is in Mukono District, Central Region of Uganda.

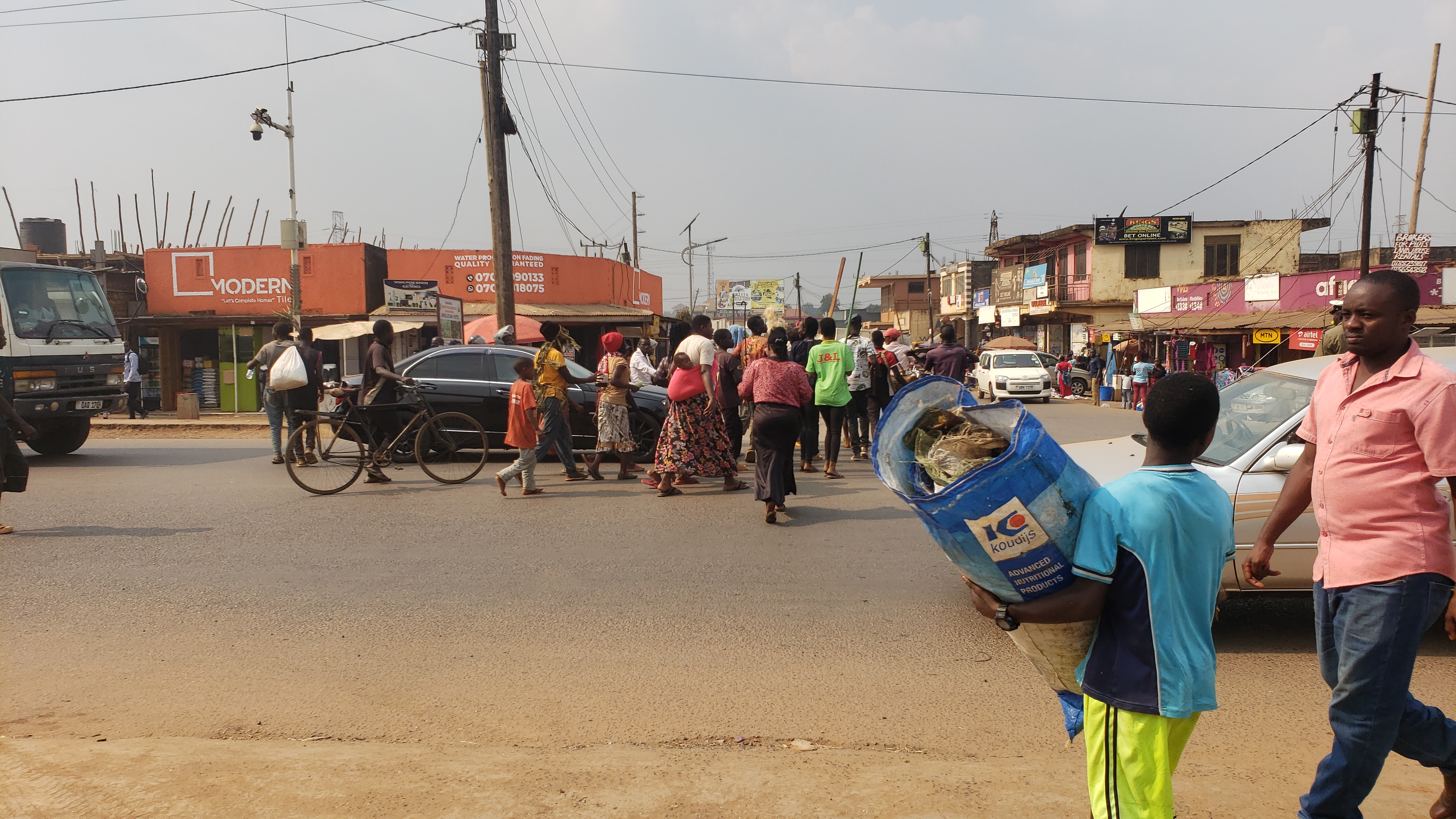
Seeta, Mukono

== Points of interest ==
The following points of interest lie within the township or close to its borders:

- Namilyango Road - The road starts at the Kampala-Jinja Highway and leads south to the village of Namilyango.
- Bukerere Road - The road starts at the Kampala-Jinja Highway and leads north towards Bukerere.
- offices and printing press of Red Pepper Publications - Producers of the weekly tabloid, The Red Pepper.
- Namanve Coca-Cola Factory - Located in neighboring Namanve.
- Rwenzori Mineral Water Bottling Company - Manufacture bottled water and other beverages.
- Seeta High School - A private, mixed, day and residential high school.
- Seeta Vocational Institute - A private day and residential vocational school on Bukerere Road.
- Sanit East Africa, manufacturer of cleaning and general sanitary products on Bukerere Road.
- IQRA, Nursery & Nursery Primary School, Seeta Bajjo

== See also ==
- Namanve
- Namilyango
- Namilyango College
- Bajjo
