= Namilyango College =

Secondary school in Uganda

Location
- Namilyango, Mukono District; Uganda; 0°20′19″N 32°43′02″E

Information
- Type: Public middle school and high school (13-19)
- Motto: "Nisi Dominus" (If not the Lord, [it is] in vain)
- Religious affiliation: Catholic Church
- Established: March 23, 1902; 124 years ago
- Founder: Bishop Henry Hanlon
- Headteacher: Constantine Mpuuga
- Enrollment: 1,010 (2014)
- Houses: 13
- Colours: Green and Yellow
- Athletics: Rugby, football, track, tennis, volleyball, basketball
- Nickname: "NGO" "The College" "Anchors"
- Rivals: St. Mary's College Kisubi
- Publication: The Anchor
- Alumni: Ngonians
- Website: Homepage

Namilyango College is a boys-only boarding secondary school located in Mukono District in the Central Region of Uganda, whose history and excellence in sports and academics have made it one of the most prestigious schools in Uganda. It is Uganda's oldest secondary school, founded in 1902 by the Catholic Mill Hill Fathers.

== Location ==
The school campus is situated on Namilyango Hill, approximately 7 kilometres (4.3 mi), by road, southwest of Mukono Town, the district headquarters, and about 4 kilometres (2 mi), by road, south of the township of Seeta, the nearest trading center. The college lies approximately 20 kilometres (12 mi), by road, east of Kampala, Uganda's capital and largest city. The coordinates of Namilyango College are:0°20'19.0"N, 32°43'02.0"E (Latitude:0.338611; Longitude:32.717222).

== History ==
The school was founded in March 1902 by the Mill Hill Fathers, a London-based Catholic missionary society, to educate the sons of Catholic chiefs. At the time, the Mill Hill Missionaries' approach to education for locals was guided by their objective of training local catechists and, eventually, local priests. The first students at Namilyango were being trained to become, first and foremost, catechists; those who were considered unfit for that vocation would be sent away or, if they were of good character, educated further so they could be taken on as clerks in the colonial government.

== Reputation ==
Namilyango College is one of the most prestigious schools in Uganda, owing to its history, influence, excellent academic performance and dominance in sports. It is the oldest secondary school and the first college in Uganda, and for long was the best school in boxing until the sport was stopped in the school in the early 1990s.

Rugby is the biggest sport in the College. Namilyango has won the national schools' rugby title more than any other school, and has sent numerous players to the national team. Namilyango College was a pioneer in Information Technology in Ugandan schools, building one of the first computer labs. It is also now acknowledged by modern Ugandan students as a member of The G8's of Ugandan education.

== Relations with other schools ==
Over the years a tradition of Namilyango College has been the rivalries with fellow prestigious schools, in academics, sports and socialising. The rivals have included, in decreasing order of rivalry: St. Mary's College Kisubi, King's College Budo and Busoga College Mwiri.

In recent times the fiercest rivalries have been with Budo and SMACK (Kisubi), as all three institutions field strong teams in the Rugby and field hockey disciplines. In the post-covid era, Namilyango has won two Central Schools' Rugby championships (2022 and 2024) and the rugby title at the 2022 Federation of East African Schools' Sports Association (FEASSA). Budo has won the rugby title at the Uganda Secondary Schools' Sports Association (USSSA) twice (2023 and 2024), and Kisubi won the rugby title at the 2023 FEASSA Games.

Over the years, the school has maintained cordial relations with schools like: Mount Saint Mary's College Namagunga, Trinity College Nabbingo, Nabisunsa Girls Secondary School and Gayaza High School. The school organises social evenings (in modern times referred to as sosh), the equivalent to the American high school prom, with one of the aforementioned girls' schools. Sosh is preserved for the Form Six students, with the College hosting in the first term while the corresponding girls' school hosted in second term. In years gone by, a Form Six class had the liberty to host two social gatherings for two different schools.

== Houses of residence ==
The college has twelve residential houses and a hostel. The "O" Level students reside in the residential houses while the "A" Level students reside in Minderop Hostel, named after Father James Minderop, the first headmaster of the college. The twelve O'Level residential houses are:

House name and Colours
Minderop – N/A
Biermans – Yellow
Billington – Green
Campling – Red
Doyle – Purple
Hanlon – Navy Blue
Kiwanuka – Maroon
Kuipers – White
McKee – Orange
Mukasa – Black
Reesinck – Blue
Heweston – N/A
Charles Lwanga – Grey

1. Biermans House - Named after Bishop John Biermans (MHM), Vicariate Apostolic of Upper Nile 1912 - 1924
2. Billington House - Named after Bishop Vincent Billington (MHM) (1904 - 1976), Bishop of Kampala 1953 - 1965
3. Campling House - Named after Bishop John William Campling (MHM), Vicariate Apostolic of Upper Nile 1925 - 1937
4. Doyle House - Named after Reverend Father Captain Bernard Doyle (MHM), the longest serving Headmaster (19 years) of the College
5. Hanlon House - "House of Lords", named after Bishop Henry Hanlon (MHM) 1862 - 1937, Vicar Apostolic of Upper Nile 1894 - 1911
6. Kiwanuka House - Named after Archbishop Joseph Kiwanuka, the first native African to be appointed Archbishop of the Roman Catholic Church in East Africa
7. Kuipers House - Named after Father Bernard Kuipers (MHM), served the College for 30 years as teacher, Headmaster, and Chaplain
8. McKee House - Named after Father Kevin McKee (MHM), a teacher at the College
9. Mukasa House - Named after Mr. Noah Mukasa, a former Biology teacher at the College
10. Reesinck House - Named after Bishop John Reesinck (MHM), Vicariate Apostolic of Upper Nile 1938 - 1950
11. Heweston House - Named after Father Henry Heweston, former headmasters of the school.
12. Charles Lwanga House - Named after, Saint Charles Lwanga, one of the Uganda Martyrs

== Notable alumni ==
The Namilyango College Old Boys Association (NACOBA) was formed in 1939, with a helping hand from the then Head Master, Fr. Bernard Doyle. Former students of Namilyango College are called "Old Ngonians", and include a prime minister, a Chief Justice, cabinet ministers, clergymen, members of the royal family of Buganda, judges, lawyers, academics, and sportsmen. Some of the prominent alumni of the school include:

=== Royals ===
- Prince Yozefu Musanje Walugembe MBE (Namilyango, 1902-1904), of Buganda Kingdom; also served in the Native African Medical Corps during World War I
- Prince Augustine Tebandeke (Namilyango, 1902-1904) of Buganda Kingdom
- Prince David Wasajja (McKee, 1980-1983), of Buganda Kingdom
- Daudi Rumanyika II (Namilyango, 1914-1916), the 22nd Umugabe of Karagwe Kingdom

=== Politics ===
- George Cosmas Adyebo, Prime Minister 1991–1994
- Gerald Ssendaula, minister of finance 1998–2005 and MP for Bukoto 1980–2005
- Fred Mukisa (McKee, 1964-1969), minister for fisheries 2006–2011 and MP for Bukooli Central 2006–2011
- Vincent Nyanzi, minister of state for vice president's Office and MP for Busujju County
- Norbert Mao (Campling), Democratic Party 2011 presidential candidate and President of DP 2010 - date
- Jeremiah Twatwa (Minderop, 1971-1972), MP for Iki-Iki County
- Martin Drito (Reensich), MP for Madi-Okollo County, Arua District, 2011 to present. One of Uganda's wealthiest individuals.
- Gabriel Ajedra Aridru, former State Minister of Finance for General Duties in the Cabinet of Uganda.
- Moses Hasim Magogo (Kiwanuka, 1991-1993), FUFA president, MP Budiope East.
- John Bosco Mubiru (Charles Lwanga, 2017 - 2023), Makerere University Students' Guild 92nd Vice Guild President, 23rd Minister for Justice, Legal and Constitutional Affairs, Makerere University Education Students' Association|MESA.

=== Law ===
- Bart Magunda Katureebe, Former Chief Justice of Uganda and former member of the Supreme Court of Uganda,

=== Civil service ===
- Onegi Obel, Governor, Bank of Uganda 1973–1978 and presidential advisor
- Leo Kibirango, Governor Bank of Uganda 1981-1986
- Joseph Etima (Minderop, 1963-1964), former Commissioner of Uganda Human Rights Commission and former Commissioner General of Uganda Prisons.

=== Academia ===
- John Ssebuwufu, vice chancellor, Makerere University 1993–2004. Chancellor, Kyambogo University 2014–Present
- Nelson Sewankambo FRCP, principal, Makerere University College of Health Sciences
- David Serwadda (Campling, 1970-1974), dean Makerere University School of Public Health
- Emmanuel Mbaziira, Chemistry teacher and games master Ndejje S S S
- Peter Kaiza, Administrator and Teacher at Uganda Martyrs' SSS Namugongo (UMSSN)
- Ronald Sebuliba,(d. 23 Jan, 2024 Kigali Military Hospital), Administrator and Teacher at Uganda Martyrs' SSS Namugongo
- Mulindwa Henry, Teacher at Uganda Martyrs' Secondary School Namugongo (UMSSN)
- Mr. Ssekisaka, Teacher at Uganda Martyrs' Secondary School Namugongo
- Josephine Nambooze (1945-1950), the first indigenous female doctor in Uganda, and later medicine professor at Makerere University College of Health Sciences
- Peregrine Kibuuka (Minderop, 1966-1967), Former headmaster Namilyango College, 1986–2001.

=== Writers ===
- Austin Bukenya (Biermans, 1961-1964), author, playwright, and literary scholar

=== Other ===
- Emmanuel Katongole (Campling), Managing Director Quality Chemicals & CEO Vero Foods Limited. Current chairman of Uganda National Oil Company.
- Ndiema Keith K. (Reensick, 2018-2022), Global Student Ambassador, Crimson Education and U-Reporter at UNICEF Uganda
- Alan Kasujja (Doyle, 1989-1992), journalist and broadcaster, host of BBC Newsday and Africa Daily
- Anthony Natif(Mukasa, 1997-2002), Founder, Guardian Pharmacy, Partner Public Square East Africa
- Jonathan Paul Katumba(Charles Lwanga, 2013-2018), (Deputy Head prefect,2017-2018), founder Minute5 Ug

== See also ==
- Education in Uganda.
- Namilyango.
- Mbale Secondary School.
