= New Karuma Bridge =

Planned road bridge in Uganda

- Coordinates: 02°14′35″N 32°14′22″E New Karuma Bridge (Uganda)
- Carries: Kampala–Gulu Highway
- Crosses: Victoria Nile
- Locale: Karuma, Uganda to Karuma Falls, Uganda
- Official name: Second Karuma Bridge

Characteristics
- Design: Cable-stayed bridge
- Material: Steel, concrete

History
- Construction start: 4 November 2026
- Opened: 2030 Expected

Location
- Interactive map of New Karuma Bridge

The New Karuma Bridge, also referred to as the Second Karuma Bridge, is a road bridge under construction in Uganda. It will replace the current Karuma Bridge, which was built in 1963.

== Location ==
The bridge would be located at Karuma Falls, across the Victoria Nile, immediately west and downstream of the old Karuma Bridge. This is approximately 257 kilometres (160 mi), by road, north of Kampala, Uganda's capital and largest city. It is located on the Kampala–Gulu Highway, approximately 77 kilometres (48 mi), by road, south of Gulu, the largest city in the Northern Region of Uganda.

== History ==
The current Karuma Bridge (the old bridge) was constructed in 1963, one year after Uganda attained independence from Britain. The old bridge is a narrow, one carriageway (one lane in each direction) bridge, without pedestrian or bicycle lanes and no monitoring equipment. The bridge has been the site of several major accidents.

The proposed new bridge would be modeled after the New Jinja Bridge in the Eastern Region of Uganda. A suspended cable bridge, with bicycle/motorcycle lanes is being considered. The feasibility studies and technical designs for the new bridge have been concluded. The Japan International Cooperation Agency (JICA) had indicated interest in the project, although it had not confirmed willingness to fund it, as of 2018.

== Construction ==
Construction commencement is contingent on securing a government down-payment and development partner counter-funding. As of October 2020, according to the New Vision newspaper, the government of Japan, through JICA, was evaluating the possibility of funding the construction of the New Karuma Bridge. That evaluation process was still ongoing as of April 2024.

== Construction costs ==
In 2017, NBS Television reported that the estimated cost of the new bridge was in excess of US$100 million.

== Developments ==
In April 2024 the New Vision newspaper reported that the design of the new bridge was ongoing and would conclude in 2026. Construction was expected to commence in 2029. Oriental Consultants Global and Prome Consultants Limited are responsible for the execution of the environmental and social impact studies.

In October 2024 high ranking JICA officials, held discussions with a Uganda government delegation led by Fred Byamukama, the state minister for transport, to fast-track the construction of the new Karuma Bridge. The new bridge will be elevated and straightened out to eliminate sharp curves. The construction price estimate as of October 2024 was Shs550 billion ($150 million).

In March 2025, the Ugandan Finance Minister, Matia Kasaija, the Japanese Ambassador to Uganda, Sasayama Takuya, and JICA's Chief Representative, Inoue Yoichi signed an agreement to construct this bridge with funding budgeted at USh121 billion (US$33.2 million) provided by JICA. Construction is expected to start in June 2026 and last four years.

In July 2026, JICA with Uganda government officials signed a binding agreement in Tokyo, Japan indicating that JICA will fund the construction. The Engineering, procurement, and construction contract was awarded to the Zenikata Corporation of Japan. Construction is expected to start in August 2026 and last about four years. Construction began on 4 November 2026 and is expected to last about three years.

== See also ==
- List of roads in Uganda

== Photos ==
- Photo of Old Karuma Bridge
