= Source of the Nile Bridge =

Bridge in Uganda

Source of the Nile Bridge Jinja
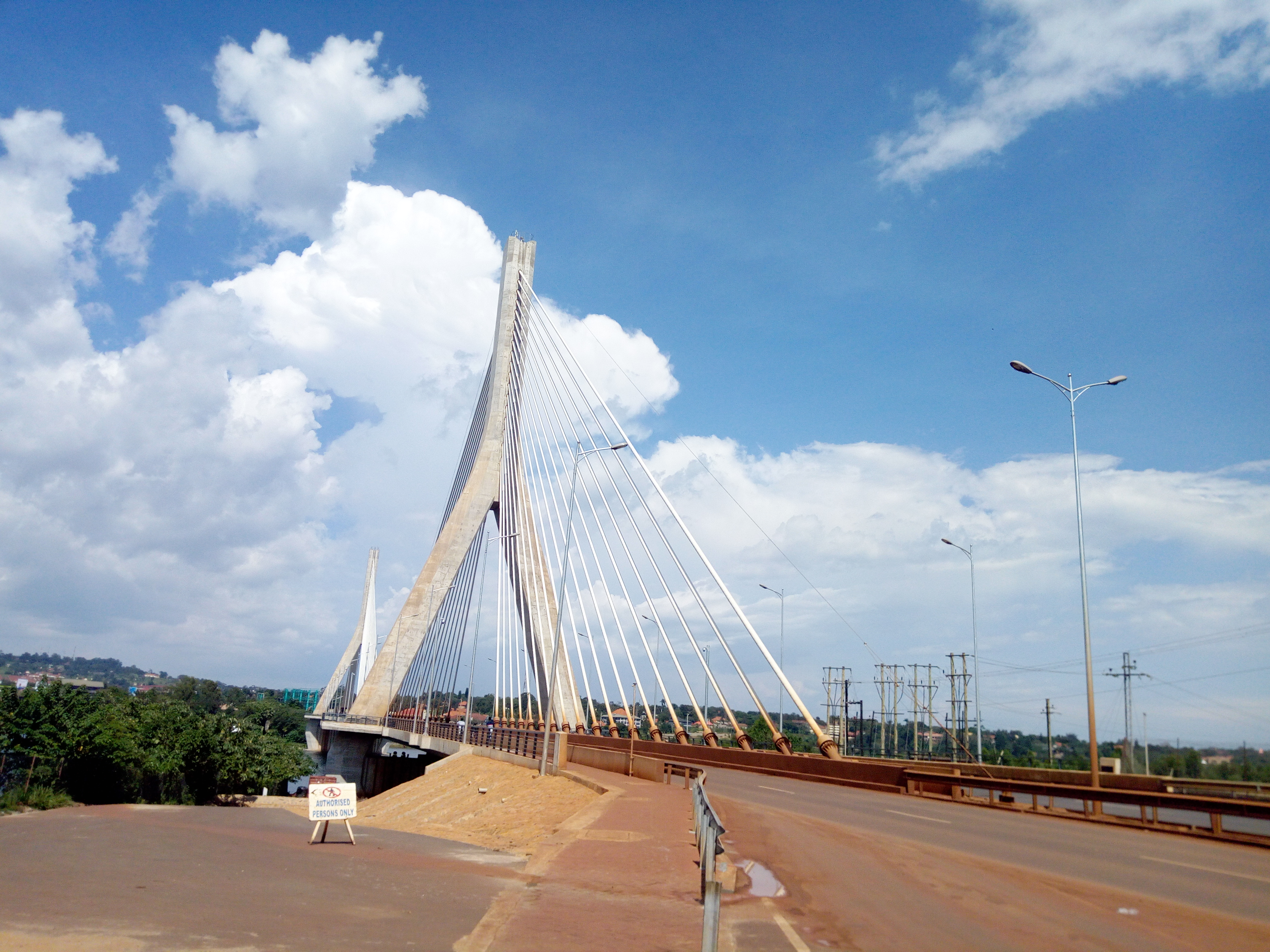
- Coordinates: 0.438611°N 33.187500°E
- Carries: Kampala–Jinja Expressway
- Crosses: Victoria Nile
- Locale: Jinja, Uganda
- Official name: Source of the Nile Bridge Jinja

Characteristics
- Design: Cable-stayed bridge
- Material: Steel, concrete
- Total length: 525 metres (1,722 ft)
- Longest span: 285 metres (935 ft)

History
- Construction start: January 2014
- Opened: 17 October 2018

Location
- Interactive map of Source of the Nile Bridge Jinja

The Source of the Nile Bridge, also New Jinja Bridge, which was commissioned on 17 October 2018, by the president of Uganda, is a cable-stayed bridge across the Victoria Nile in Uganda. It replaced the Nalubaale Bridge, which was built in 1954.

== Location ==
The bridge is located at Jinja city (the second capital of Uganda after Kampala) across the Victoria Nile, between the source of the Nile to the south and Nalubaale Power Station (old bridge) to the north. This is adjacent and immediately north of where the Uganda Railways line crosses the Victoria Nile. It is located on the proposed Kampala–Jinja Expressway, approximately 77.5 kilometres (48 mi), by road, east of Kampala, Uganda's capital and largest city. The coordinates of the New Jinja Bridge are 0°26'19.0"N, 33°11'15.0"E (Latitude:0.438611; Longitude:33.187500).

== History ==
Prior to the construction of this bridge, the Nalubaale Bridge was one of only two road crossings across the Victoria Nile in Uganda, the other crossing being the Karuma Bridge, approximately 330 kilometres (205 mi), by road, to the north. The road crossing at Jinja is of national and regional significance because it is part of the "Northern Corridor", a highway across east and central Africa linking the Indian Ocean at Mombasa, Kenya, to the Atlantic Ocean at Matadi, Democratic Republic of the Congo. The old bridge, commissioned in 1954, is in bad structural shape and has outlived its expected lifespan. The new bridge carries a four-lane dual highway with pedestrian sidewalks. It is the longest bridge in Uganda at 525 metres (1,722 ft) long and 22.9 metres (75 ft) wide. The feasibility studies were conducted by the Japan International Cooperation Agency.

== Construction ==
In November 2013, the Uganda National Roads Authority awarded the construction contract to the Zenitaka Corporation of Japan and Hyundai Engineering and Construction Company of South Korea. Construction was expected to last four years. On 28 January 2014, the construction was launched by the President of Uganda.

As of August 2017, the construction was 40 percent complete, according to the bridge contractors, as reported by The Observer (Uganda). During an inspection tour of the construction site by the Japanese ambassador to Uganda, the contractors revealed that they had started using steel from an unnamed Ugandan manufacturer, after the product met the contractors' standards.

Other infrastructure developments associated with the new bridge, include a “roadside station” or service centre on the Jinja side, which will host a restaurant, supermarket, public toilets, and an exhibition area. The station will also accommodate a chamber for bridge maintenance, security and an emergency response unit. The development also calls for surface roads on the Njeru side to connect to the Nyenga-Njeru Road, the proposed Kampala–Jinja Expressway, the existing Kampala–Jinja Highway, and the Mukono–Kayunga–Njeru Road. Road connections to the town of Jinja will be constructed, east of the road service centre.

The bridge was commissioned on 17 October 2018 by the President of Uganda Yoweri Kaguta Museveni to national acclaim. The president did caution though that the bridge is to be traversed by vehicular and pedestrian traffic only and is out of bounds to cyclists locally known as "bodabodas" which include bicycles and motorcycles which were advised to use the old Nalubale Bridge.

== Construction costs ==
The total cost of the New Jinja Bridge was budgeted at US$125 million. The government of Japan will finance 80 percent of the cost, in the form of a soft loan of US$100 million at an annual interest rate of 0.01 percent, repayable in ten years but extendable to forty years. The government of Uganda will fund the remaining US$25 million (20 percent), out of its own coffers.

In March 2018, the Ugandan parliament authorized a supplementary loan from JICA, amounting to JPY:3.891 billion (UShs 133 billion or US$36.721), to complete this project. The bridge was completed and officially commissioned on 17 October 2018. The cost of construction was quoted at US$112 million (approximately USh41.1 billion) and the bridge has a projected lifespan of 120 years.

== See also ==
- List of roads in Uganda
- New Karuma Bridge
