= Kyagalanyi Coffee Limited =

Coffee processing company in Uganda

- Type: Private
- Industry: Food Industry
- Founded: 1990
- Headquarters: 1-3 Spring Close; Bugolobi, Kampala, Uganda
- Key people: David Barry; Managing Director
- Services: Coffee Procurement, Processing & Export

Kyagalanyi Coffee Limited is a private company in Uganda, involved in coffee procurement, processing and export.

== Overview ==
Kyagalanyi is a leading coffee procurement, processing and marketing company in Uganda. In 2009, the company exported over 510,000 bags of coffee, each weighing 60 kg. This represented approximately 16% of all the country's coffee export that year, totaling 3.2 million bags. The coffee was sold primarily the European Union, Japan, Australia and South Sudan. The company also markets directly to the major international coffee roasting companies.

When Uganda's coffee crop was nearly decimated by the coffee wilt disease in the 1990s and early 2000s, Kyagalanyi played a major role in re-seeding with wilt-resistant varieties of Robusta coffee. At the company's 7 acres (2.8 ha) facility in Nakanyonyi Village, Mukono District, Kyagalanyi established a nursery with these new varieties and supplied them to farmers at no cost. The company has its main processing plant in Kampala's Industrial Area and another processing factory in Mbale, that is dedicated to processing Arabica coffee, that is grown in the mountainous region around Mount Elgon.

== History ==
The company was founded by Dr. Paul Mugambwa in the 1990s when the coffee sector was liberalized by the Ugandan Government.

== See also ==
- KCCA
- Uganda Economy
- Mukono
- Mbale District
