= Vincent Nyanzi =

Ugandan politician (born 1951)

- Born: 7 September 1951 (age 74); Uganda
- Citizenship: Uganda
- Education: Makerere University (Bachelor of Arts in Fine Art) (Diploma in Education); Undisclosed Institution in Hyderabad (Certificate in Human Resources Management) (Certificate in Small Enterprise Policy)
- Occupation: Politician
- Years active: 1992 — present
- Known for: Politics
- Title: State Minister, Office of the Vice President

Vincent Makumbi Nyanzi is a Ugandan educator and politician. He is the current State Minister in the Office of the Vice President in the Uganda's Cabinet. He was appointed to this position on 27 May 2011. He replaced James Baba, who was appointed State Minister for Internal Affairs. Prior to that, from 16 February 2009 until 27 May 2011, he served as State Minister for Economic Planning in the Office of the President. He is also the elected Member of Parliament representing "Busujju County", Mityana District.

== Background and education ==
He was born in Mityana District on 7 September 1951. He attended Rubenga Boys' Primary School, graduating with the Primary Leaving Certificate in 1966. He then attended Saint Edward College for his O-Level studies, graduating in 1970. For his A-Level education, he studied at Namilyango College, an all-boys' residential middle and high school in Mukono District, graduating in 1972. In 1973, he was admitted to Makerere University, Uganda's oldest and largest public university, graduating in 1976 with the degree of Bachelor of Arts in Fine Art and the Diploma in Education. In 2000, he received two certificates, one in Human Resources Management and the other in Small Enterprise Policy, both from an undisclosed institution in Hyderabad, India.

== Career ==
From 1976 until 1982, he taught in high school. Between 1992 and 1996, he worked as a District Councilor in Mubende District, prior to Mityana District splitting from Mubende District. He entered national politics and was elected to parliament in 1996 and has been re-elected continuously since. Between 1998 and 2000, he served as Minister of State for Industry and Technology. Between 2000 and 2001, he served as Minister of State for Gender and Culture.

== Controversy ==
During the 2001 parliamentary election campaign, his bodyguard shot and killed a man. Nyanzi, together with the bodyguard, were arrested and charged with murder. He was released on bail and eventually exonerated by the courts. In 2003, his bodyguard was convicted on manslaughter and received a four year prison sentence. Nyanzi lost his ministerial appointment during that period, but retained his parliamentary seat. In the cabinet reshuffle of 27 May 2011, he was moved from State Minister for Economic Monitoring in the Office of the President to State Minister in the Office of the Vice President.

== Personal details ==
Vincent Nyanzi is married. She is reported to enjoy farming. He holds his parliamentary seat as a member of the ruling National Resistance Movement political party.

== See also ==
- Parliament of Uganda
- Cabinet of Uganda
- Mityana District
