= Martin Drito =

Ugandan businessman

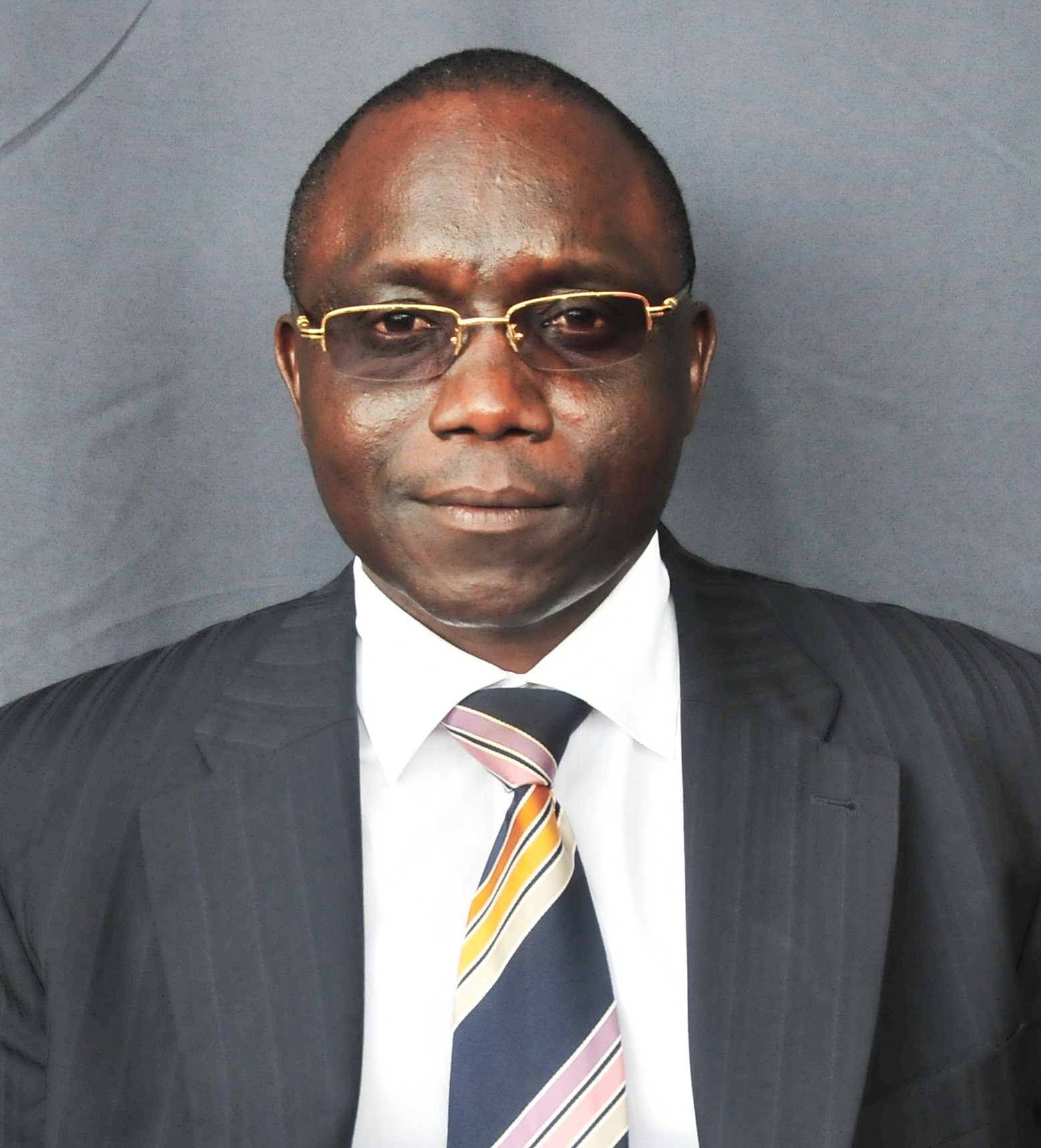
- Born: Martin Andi; 15 June 1957 (age 69); Arua, Uganda
- Education: University of East London (Bachelor of Science in Economics); University of Conakry (Master of Business Administration)
- Occupations: Politician & businessman
- Years active: 1987–present
- Title: Managing Director & CEO; Drito Global Corporation Limited
- Spouse: 1

Martin Andi Drito is an economist, businessman, entrepreneur and politician in Uganda, the third-largest economy in the East African Community. He is the current managing director and chief executive officer of Drito Global Corporation Limited, a mining and logging company that he founded and owns. In 2007, he was reported to be one of the wealthiest individuals in Uganda.

Martin was elected to parliament for Madi-Okollo County, Arua District, in 2011. He lost his parliamentary seat in the 2016 parliamentary elections.

== Background and education ==
He was born in Arua, on 15 June 1957. He attended Ezuku Primary School, from 1963 until 1969. He transferred to Old Kampala Secondary School for his O-Level studies, from 1970 through 1973. He entered Namilyango College in 1974, completing his A-Level studies at the College, in 1975. In 1987, he obtained the degree of Bachelor of Science (BSc) in Applied Economics. In 2010, he obtained the degree of Master of Business Administration (MBA), from the University of Conakry, in Guinea, West Africa.

== Career ==
In 1992, Martin Andi Drito established two companies: (a) Drito Global Corporation and (b) Nile Trading Corporation. The two businesses are involved in mining, mineral processing, timber development and logging. He is the managing director and CEO of both companies, which maintain offices at Workers House, on Pilkington Road, in Kampala's central business district. From 1998 until 2004, Martin Drito served as an Advisor to the President of Guinea on mineral policy and implementation. In 2011, he successfully ran for the parliamentary constituency of Madi-Okollo County, in Arua District, and is the incumbent MP.

== Other considerations ==
Between 2011 and 2016, he was a member of the Parliament of Uganda, and sat on the Committee on Natural Resources and on the Committee on Budget. He later lost his parliamentary seat in the 2016 parliamentary elections.

== See also ==
- Parliament of Uganda
- List of African millionaires
