= Kampala Southern Bypass Highway =

Road in Uganda

Coordinates: 00°21′04″N 32°39′45″E

Route information
- Length: 11 mi (18 km)
- History: Designated in 2016 (Expected); Expected completion in 2026

Major junctions
- North end: Bweyogerere
- Butabika; Luzira; Kyeyitabya
- South end: Munyonyo

Location
- Country: Uganda

Highway system
- Roads in Uganda

The Kampala Southern Bypass Highway is a proposed four-lane, dual carriage highway in the Central Region of Uganda, connecting, Bweyogerere, in the Wakiso District, to Munyonyo in the Makindye Division of Kampala, the largest city and capital of Uganda.

== Location ==
The road would start at Bweyogerere on the Kampala–Jinja Expressway, near Mandela National Stadium at Namboole. It would pass through Butabika, Luzira, and Kyeyitabya, to end at Munyonyo, where it would join the southern spur of the Entebbe–Kampala Expressway. The Kampala Southern Bypass would measure approximately 18 kilometres (11 mi).

== Background ==
As part of efforts to decongest Kampala, a southern bypass similar to the Kampala Northern Bypass Highway has been proposed. The road would form an arc through the city's southeastern suburbs. It would join the southern spur of the Entebbe–Kampala Expressway, which traverses the southeastern suburbs of the city, to form a semi-circle. The road would be a toll road and would be tendered, constructed, and owned by the consortium that will own, manage, and operate the Kampala–Jinja Expressway.

== Timetable ==
Originally, the tender for this road together with that for the Kampala–Jinja Expressway were planned to be advertised in May 2015. Once construction starts, the combined 95 kilometres (59 mi) Kampala–Jinja Expressway & Kampala Southern Bypass Highway is projected to take 10 years to construct.

In September 2018, UNRA revealed that eight firms had bid to be considered in the construction of this highway and the connecting Kampala–Jinja Expressway. The consortia vying for the contract include (1) South Korean and Chinese firms, comprising the CCKS Consortium (2) Tecnasol Luisa Goncal from Portugal (3) Shapoorji Pacconji Group from India (4) A consortium of Chang Chyi Enterprise Company Limited (CCECL) & CRCCIG from China (5) Enkula Expressway Consortium from South Africa (6) A consortium of Austria & Turkish firms, Strabag & IC Ictas (7) A consortium of French and Portuguese firms KJ Connect, Vinci Concessions & Mota-Engil and (8) China Communications Construction Company & China First Highway Engineering Company Limited.

== Construction costs ==
It is estimated that the Kampala Southern Bypass Highway would cost approximately US$250 million (about UGX:664 billion) to build.

== See also ==
- List of roads in Uganda
