= Sikander Lalani =

Ugandan businessman and industrialist

- Born: 4 October 1944 (age 81); Nsambya Hospital, Uganda
- Education: University College London (Bachelor of Medicine, Bachelor of Surgery); Royal College of Pathologists (Member of the Royal College of Pathologists)
- Occupations: Businessman, industrialist, entrepreneur, and histopathologist
- Years active: 1972 – present
- Title: Managing director & chief executive officer Roofings Group
- Spouse: Winnie Abotile Lalani

Sikander Lalani is a businessman, MD at Roofings Group entrepreneur, industrialist, and former histopathologist in Uganda. He is reported to be one of the wealthiest individuals in Uganda.

== Background and education ==
Lalani was born on 4 November 1944 at Nsambya Hospital in Kampala. He trained as a histopathologist and practiced for two years in the 1960s at the University College Hospital in London, United Kingdom.

== Career ==
He left medicine and opened a retail electronics store in Kigali, Rwanda, in the 1970s, specializing in the Philips brand. Later, he became a distributor of Goodyear tyres in Rwanda.

In 1976, his Japanese associates, who supplied him with electronics, introduced him to the idea of manufacturing metallic roofing materials in Rwanda. With the assistance of the Rwanda Development Bank, he successfully applied for a loan of US$1 million from the World Bank. In 1978, he set up a factory in Kigali, manufacturing roofing material. When genocide broke out in 1994, he left Rwanda for Tanzania. He then relocated to Uganda because of excessive bureaucracy in Tanzania.

== Roofings Group ==
Over the last two decades, Lalani has built a steel-manufacturing conglomerate in Uganda, consisting of three separate factories. His businesses are organized into the Roofings Group.

== Net worth ==
According to the 2022CEO East Africa web article in 2023, Lalani had a net worth of approximately US$1 billion.

== Personal ==
Lalani is married to Winnie Abotile Lalani and they have 4 children together (2024).

== See also ==
- Indian diaspora in East Africa
