= Zirimiti Forest Reserve =

Forest reserve in Mukono District, central Uganda

- Location within Uganda
- Interactive map of Zirimiti Forest Reserve

Geography
- Location: Mukono District Uganda
- Coordinates: 0°14′N 32°45′E
- Elevation: 1,163 m (3,816 ft)

Administration
- Governing body: National Forestry Authority (NFA)
- Website: [[NFA%20Uganda](https://www.nfa.org.ug/) www.nfa.org.ug/)]

Zirimiti Forest Reserve is a forest reserve in Mukono District, Central Uganda. It encompasses an area with an elevation of around 1,163 meters (3,816 feet). It is positioned close to the localities of Kitenda and Kipayo, making it an important ecological and community area in the region. The reserve is along the shores of Lake Victoria.

== Ecological significance ==
Zirimiti Forest Reserve is an area of ecological significance due to its role in maintaining biodiversity and maintaining ecosystem balance within the local environment around the shores of Lake Victoria. The reserve is home to a diverse array of flora and fauna, including various species of trees and plants, some of which are native to the region.

== Conservation efforts and challenges ==
The reserve has encountered issues related to encroachment and illegal activities. The residents of Bugoye village in Ntenjeru Sub County have taken proactive measures to safeguard the forest. They have established surveillance and roadblocks to prevent further encroachment following incidents where armed individuals attempted to clear parts of the forest for cultivation. These community efforts are vital in preserving the integrity of the forest reserve. In response to the identified challenges, various directives have been issued by the higher authorities, including Yoweri Museveni, who instructed the State House Anti-Corruption Unit, led by Lieutenant Colonel Edith Nakalema, to investigate and curtail any illegal activities within Zirimiti Forest Reserve and other forest reserves.

== Local community involvement ==
The local community is involved in various conservation efforts of Zirimiti Forest Reserve, including patrolling and reporting illegal activities. Additionally, dialogues have taken place between community leaders, the National Forestry Authority (NFA), and other stakeholders to promote sustainable use of the forest land. These initiatives involve planting indigenous trees and suitable crops in accordance with the conservation objectives.

== Significance to the community ==
Zirimiti Forest Reserve plays a vital role in both preserving biodiversity and maintaining the local climate, as well as contributing to the economic wellbeing of the surrounding community. It is an important source of natural resources, such as firewood, which are utilized by the community while being carefully regulated to prevent overexploitation. Additionally, the forest reserve presents an opportunity for sustainable eco-tourism, which can provide economic benefits to the local community while promoting conservation efforts.
