= Fred Nyanzi Ssentamu =

Ugandan politician (born 1971)

Fred Nyanzi Ssentamu (born 1971), also known as Chairman Nyanzi, is a Ugandan politician, activist, businessman and a leader of the informal sector in the National Unity Platform.

== Early life and education background ==
Fred Nyanzi Ssentamu was born in 1971 to J. W. Ssentamu and Margaret Nalunkuma, who was a nurse by profession.

He attended Kanoni Primary School and later joined Kasaka Primary School. He proceeded to Bukalagi Primary School and St. Herman Primary School in Nkozi, where he completed Primary Five. After that, he joined City Primary School and later Bikira Demonstration School, where he completed his Primary Seven.

He joined Kololo High School, where he was part of the boxing team, and later attended Mitiyana Secondary School, completing his O-Level (Senior Four). He returned to Kololo High School for his A-Level studies before joining Makerere University, where he earned a degree in Social Sciences.

Nyanzi holds a master's degree in Peace and Conflict Studies from Makerere University.

== Career ==
Nyanzi started his career as a mobilizer and later joined active politics. He works with the National Unity Platform (NUP), where he has served as head of mobilisation. His work involves organizing people and supporting political campaigns. He became well known during the People Power Movement. In 2021, he contested for Member of Parliament in Kampala Central but lost. He continues to be active in politics and leadership.
