= Austin Bukenya =

Ugandan writer

- Born: Austin Bukenya; 10 February 1944 (age 82); Masaka, Uganda
- Education: Makerere University Namilyango College
- Occupations: Poet, playwright, novelist and academic administrator
- Writing career
- Genres: Novels, plays, poetry
- Notable works: The People's Bachelor (1972); The Bride (1987)

Austin Bukenya (born 10 February 1944) is a Ugandan poet, playwright, novelist and academic administrator. He is the author of the novel The People's Bachelor, and a play, The Bride. He has taught languages, literature and drama at Makerere University in Uganda and universities in the UK, Tanzania and Kenya since the late 1960s. He has also held residences at universities in Rwanda and Germany. Bukenya is also a literary critic, novelist, poet and dramatist. An accomplished stage and screen actor, he was for several years Director of the Creative and Performing Arts Centre at Kenyatta University, Nairobi.

== Early life and education ==
Bukenya, who prefers to be called Mwalimu, was born in 1944 in Masaka town, Southern Uganda, where his father worked as a policeman. His family later moved to Kitukutwe, 15 miles from Kampala. His father was a staunch Catholic who would narrate biblical stories which he would alternate with his mother's folk stories. According to Bukenya, these stories inspired his imagination.

He attended Gayaza primary school and joined Kisubi Seminary where he studied three languages, French, English and Latin. This would soon inform his literary thinking and future academic career. His growing passion for literature was soon cemented at Namilyango College, where he took his O- and A-level exams. In 1965, he went to Dar es Salaam University where he continued to nurture his keen interest in Language and Linguistics in addition to a growing interest in Kiswahili. He studied the Language Linguistics and Literature and Education (LLLE) for his undergraduate course. Most of Bukenya's writings are in Kiswahili, he attributes this to his grandmother, whose roots can be traced back to Dar es Salaam. He was also inspired by linguistic teachers including Wilson Whitely, a British author famous for his book Kiswahili: the Rising of a National Language. Bukenya joined Makerere as a postgraduate student in 1968 and later developed the oral literature course. He also studied at universities in Madagascar and England, and took his higher degrees at Makerere and Kenyatta Universities. He has taught languages, literature and drama at Makerere University in Uganda and universities in the UK, Tanzania and Kenya since the late 1960s.

== Writing ==
A poet, a novelist and a keen actor, Bukenya was introduced to theatre and inspired to become a writer by his parents who were strong believers of Kiganda traditions. This immersion of theatre in everyday life was also a part of Bukenya’s education who grew up in a Ugandan village where he “witnessed numerous performances of children’s traditional songs and dances, games and rhythms” that inspired and influenced his writing career. Bukenya wrote his first prizewinning play in 1964, based on stories told to him by his mother. He has since written numerous plays and radio dramas, but only managed to publish two of his plays, The Secret and The Bride.

Bukenya’s works include The Mermaid of Msambweni, The Bride – a play in four parts, and John Ruganda’s The Floods, among others. He has taught in Kenya at Kenyatta University, and also Bayreuth University, Department of African Studies in Germany. His recent publication, A Hole in the Sky, focuses on the need to protect the environment and honours the late Kenyan Environmental activist and Nobel Laureate Wangari Maathai. Bukenya's work has been featured on the pan-African poetry platform Badilisha Poetry Radio. He is an honorary member of FEMRITE.

== Published works ==
=== Novels ===
- The People's Bachelor. East African Publishing House. 1972.

=== Plays ===
- The Bride. East African Educational Publishers. 1987. ISBN 9789966463616.
- A Hole in the Sky. Oxford University Press (EA). 2013. ISBN 9780195738162.

=== Literary Criticism ===
- Notes on East African Poetry Volume 13 of An H.E.B. student's guide. East African Publishing House. 1972..

=== Educational books ===
- Head Start Secondary English: Form 1. Oxford University Press, East Africa Limited. 2003. ISBN 9780195731262.,
- Oral Literature: A Junior Course [forms 1 and 2]. Longhorn Publishers. 1998. ISBN 9789966494320., with Jane Nandwa and muyigai Gachwanga
- Austin Bukenya, Wanjikũ Mũkabi Kabĩra, ed. (1994). Understanding Oral Literature. Nairobi University Press. ISBN 9789966846310., with Wanjikũ Mũkabi Kabĩra and Duncan Okoth-Okombo
- The Skills of English: An Integrated Course of Language and Literature. Oxford University Press. 1989. ISBN 9780195726930., with Arnold Curtis and James Park
- John Ruganda's The Floods: Volume 1 of H.E.B. advanced study companion. Heinemann Kenya. 1986.
- African Oral Literature for Schools. Longman Kenya. 1983. ISBN 9780582609945., with Jane Nandwa

=== Anthologies ===
- The Mermaid of Msambweni and Other Stories: An Anthology from Africa. Oxford. 2011. ISBN 9780195733778.

=== Poems ===
- Naturally, in Dick Dawson, ed. (1989). Revival: An Anthology of African Poetry. College Press. ISBN 9780869259177.
- "A Dancer's Challenge" in Badilishapoetry, 2014
- "I met a thief"
