= Perezi Kamunanwire =

Ugandan academic and diplomat

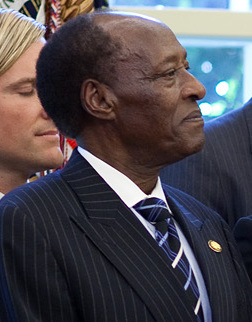
- Kamunanwire in 2010
- Born: Uganda
- Citizenship: Uganda
- Education: Bachelor of Arts in Political Science; Columbia University, New York City; Masters of Arts in International Relations; Columbia University, New York City; Doctor of Laws (Hon.); Ignatius College, New York State
- Occupation: Former Ambassador of Uganda to the United States of America
- Years active: 1986 — present
- Known for: Civil Service
- Title: Academic, Former Ambassador

Perezi Karukubiro Kamunanwire is a Ugandan academic and diplomat. He was Ambassador of Uganda to the United States from 2006 to 2013. He was appointed to that post on 15 May 2006 and served until June 2013.

== Education ==
Perezi Kamunanwire obtained the degree of Bachelor of Arts in Political Science, from Columbia University. He also holds a Master of Arts degree in International Relations, from the same university. In 2003, Ignatius College in New York awarded him an honorary degree of Doctor of Laws (LLD), in recognition of his lifetime contribution in the area of international relations. He is fluent in English and five other African languages, including: Kinyarwanda, Lingala, Luganda, Runyankole and Swahili.

== Diplomatic and Professional career ==
Between 1986 and 1988, Perezi Kamunanwire served as Uganda's Ambassador to Germany and between 1988 and 1996 he was Uganda's Permanent Representative at the United Nations in New York City. He has taught at the City College of the City University of New York, where he also directed programs in black studies and international relations. Starting in 2003, he served as an adjunct professor at the Center for Conflict Management and Organizational Research associated with Sophia University in Bulgaria. He has written and co-authored several academic books and scholarly papers in the area of International Relations.

== See also ==
- Ugandan Americans
- Oliver Wonekha
