= Uganda Investment Authority =

Organization of Uganda

- Type: Parastatal
- Industry: Investment promotion
- Founded: 1991
- Headquarters: Kampala, Uganda
- Key people: Morrison Rwakakamba; Chairman; Robert Mukiza; Ag. Executive Director
- Products: Investment licenses, tax waivers, investment advisory, serviced land, SME training
- Website: Homepage

The Uganda Investment Authority (UIA) is a semi-autonomous investment promotion and facilitation organisation in Uganda and is owned by the government of Uganda.

== Location ==
The headquarters of UIA are located at Uganda Business Facilitation Centre, Plot 1, Baskerville Avenue, Kololo. The coordinates of the head office are:0.3291° N, 32.5988° E (Latitude:0.3291857; Longitude:32.598898). The agency maintains a national network of UIA District Focal Point Offices, throughout Uganda.

== Overview ==
The UIA was created by the Ugandan Parliament in 1991. The mission of the UIA is to promote and facilitate investment projects, provide serviced land, and advocate for a competitive business environment. The UIA works with the government and the private sector to promote the economic growth of Uganda through investment and infrastructure development. UIA's parent ministry is the Ministry of Finance, Planning and Economic Development.

== Governance ==
The institution is governed by a seven-person board of directors. As of October 2024, the following individuals are members of the UIA Board:

- Dr Robert Kyamanywa - Chairperson
- Mr. Ramadhan Ggoobi - Member (also Permanent Secretary and Secretary to Treasury, Ministry of Finance, Planning, and Economic Development)
- Dr Patrick Wakida Godfrey - Member (represents the Private Sector)
- Ms. Beatrice Nambooze Musumba - Member (represents the Private Sector)
- Dr Anna Nakanwagi-Mukwaya - Member (represents the Private Sector)
- Ms. Namakoye Faith Jullie - Member (represents the Private Sector)
- Ms. Lynette Bagonza - Member (also Permanent Secretary in Ministry of Trade, Industry, and Cooperatives)

UIA's Director General is Robert Mukiza, who heads the management team comprising the following members:

- Mr Martin Muhangi - Ag. Deputy Director General
- Mrs. Justine Kasigwa Agaba - Director, One-Stop Centre
- Mrs. Robinah Nabwire Tegiike - Director, Finance and Administration
- Ms. Patience Kabije - Director Legal & Corporate and Board Affairs
- Mr. Richard Nuwenyesiga - Director, Domestic Investments Division
- Mr. Peter Muramira - Ag. Director, Investment Promotion & Business Development
- Ms. Christine Nagasha - Ag. Director, Industrial Parks Development
- Mr. John K Bwambale - Chief Internal Auditor

== See also ==
- Economy of Uganda
- Direct investment
- Uganda Securities Exchange
