= Kampala–Jinja Highway =

Road in Uganda

Coordinates: 00°22′27″N 32°54′56″E

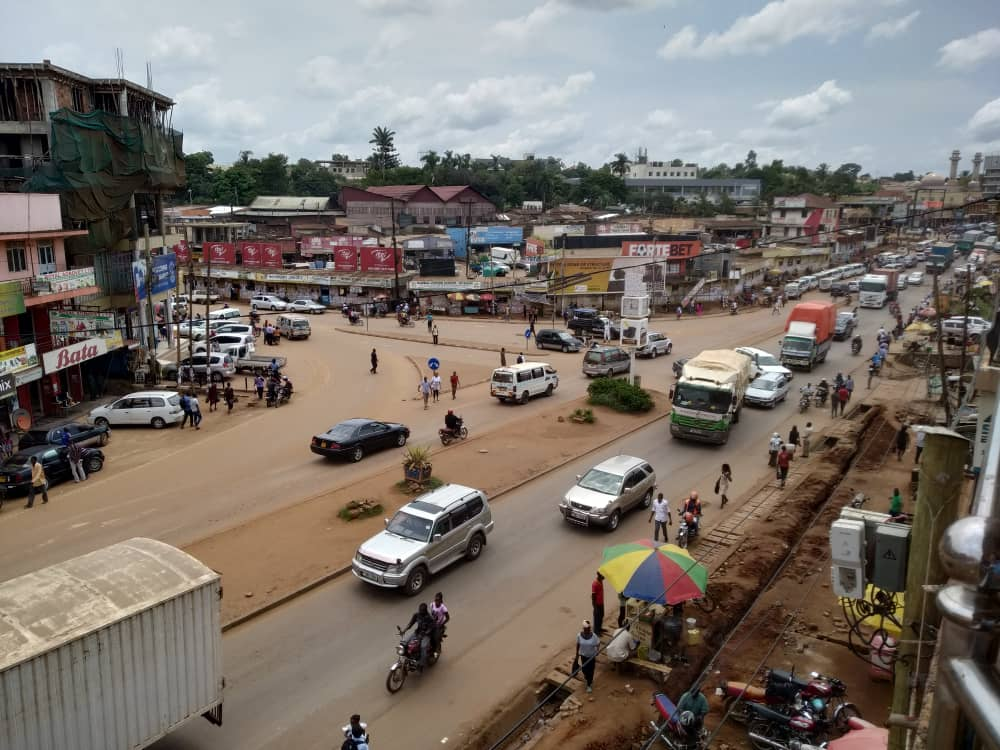
- Intersection of Kampala-Jinja Highway and Kayunga Road in Mukono Town.

Route information
- Length: 50 mi (80 km)

Major junctions
- West end: Kampala
- Mukono; Lugazi
- East end: Jinja

Location
- Country: Uganda

Highway system
- Roads in Uganda

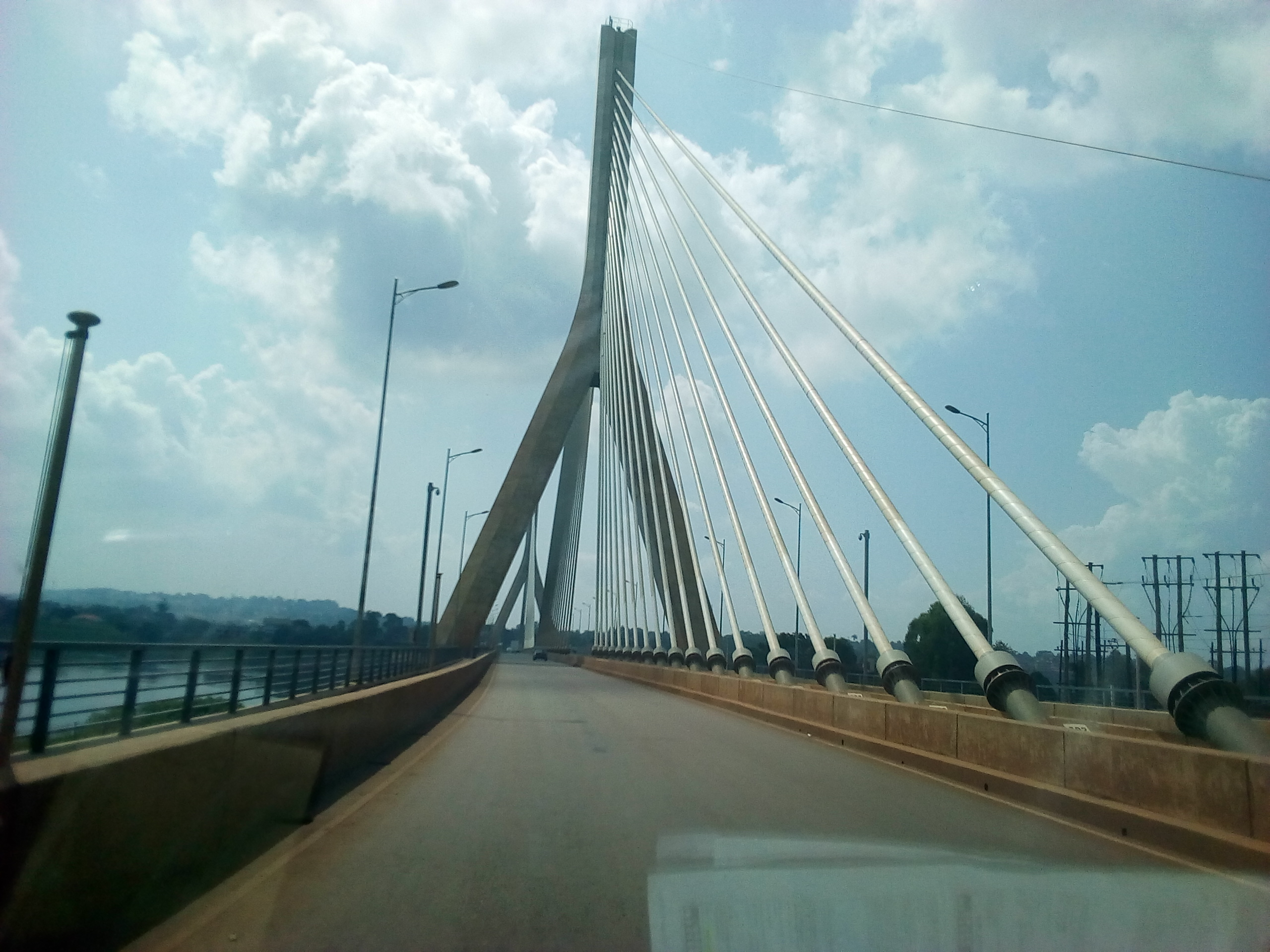
Nile Bridge in Jinja City Along Kampala-Jinja Highway.

The Kampala–Jinja Highway is a road in Uganda, connecting the cities of Kampala and Jinja. Sometimes referred to as Kampala–Jinja Road, it is a busy road, with several towns, trading centers and other points of interest along the way. As of October 2016, a new, wider, four-lane dual carriageway expressway, the Kampala–Jinja Expressway, is proposed to be constructed south of the present highway to relieve traffic and complement existing transport infrastructure between Kampala and Jinja.

== Location ==
The highway stretches from Kampala, Uganda's capital and largest city, to Jinja, the country's second largest commercial center, a distance of approximately 80 kilometres (50 mi).

== Overview ==
The highway is an all-weather tarmac single carriageway road in good condition. The highway forms a section of the Northern Corridor, a road system that connects the East African cities of Bujumbura, in Burundi, Kigali, in Rwanda and Kampala, in Uganda to Nairobi, in Kenya and ultimately to the Kenyan port of Mombasa. The road is a vital commercial link to the outside world for the three land-locked countries. It is also a vital road link to the sea, for many parts of eastern Democratic Republic of the Congo.

== Points of interest ==
The following points of interest lie along or near the Kampala–Jinja Highway: (1) Uganda Management Institute; in the Central Division of Kampala. (2) Makerere University Business School; which is located in Nakawa, Kampala. (3) Kyambogo University; in Kyambogo, Kampala. (4) Banda Hill; this is hill on which Kyambogo University is located. The name also refers to the residential and commercial neighborhoods on and around that hill. (5) Kireka; is a township located in Kira Municipality. (6) Bweyogerere; is another township in Kira Municipality. (7) Mandela National Stadium; is the largest sports stadium in Uganda, with a seating capacity of 45,202.

(8) Namilyango College; is an all-boys boarding high school which is located about 4 kilometres (2 mi), south of the highway, at Seeta in Mukono Town. (9) Mukono Town; is the point where the Mukono–Kayunga–Njeru Road and the Mukono–Kyetume–Katosi–Nyenga Road branch off the Kampala–Jinja Highway. Both reconnect to it at Njeru, 55 kilometres (34 mi) east of Mukono. (10) Sezibwa Falls; which are located approximately 1.5 kilometres (0.93 mi), south of the Highway at Kayanja, in Mukono District. (11) Mount St Mary's College Namagunga; an all-girls boarding secondary school at Namagunga, Buikwe District. (12). Lugazi Town; located in Buikwe District, it is the headquarters of Sugar Corporation of Uganda Limited.

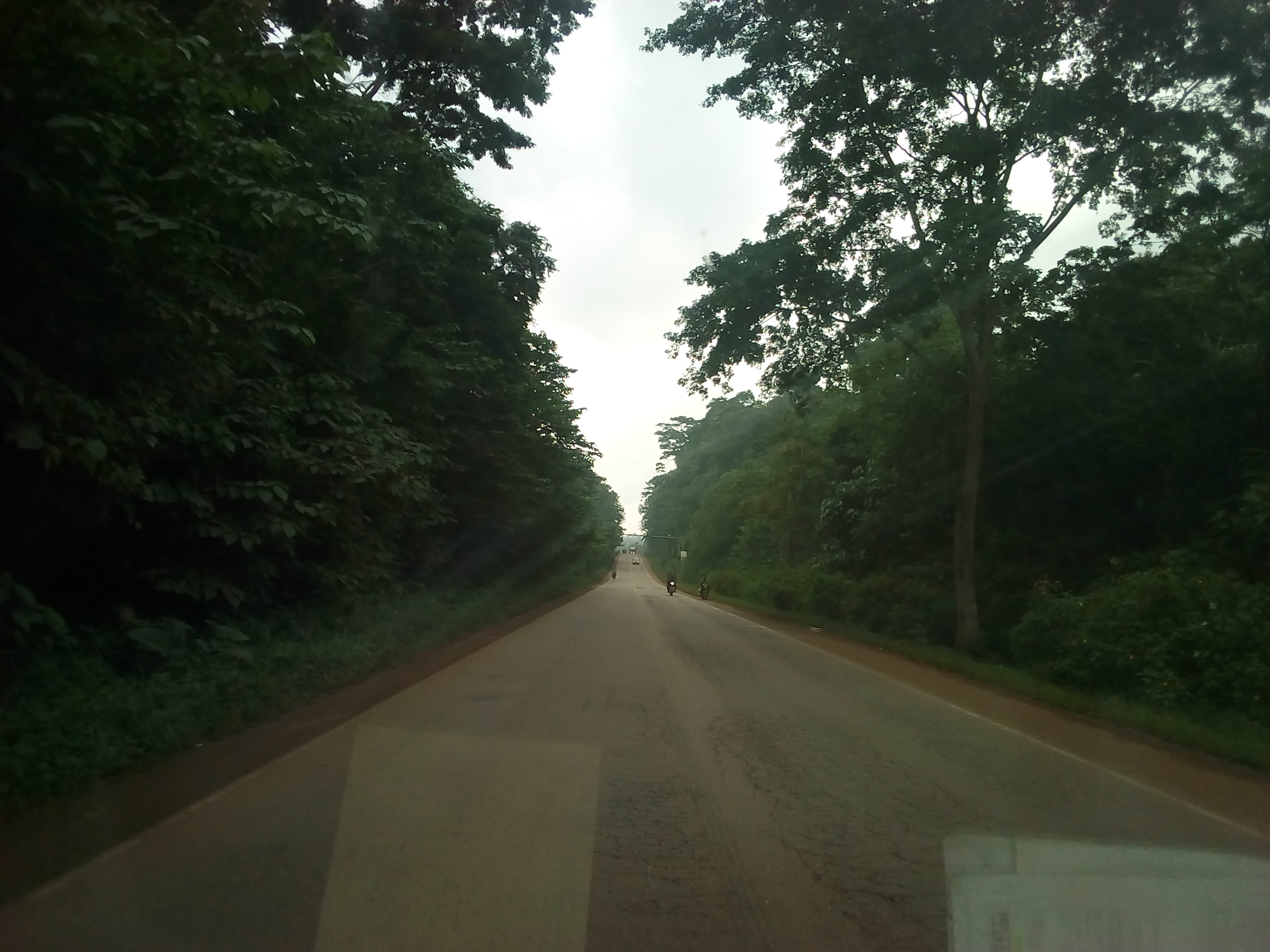
Mabira Forest area Along Kampala-Jinja Highway in Lugazi District

(13) University of Military Science and Technology; in Lugazi, is an institution of the Uganda People's Defence Force. (14) Mabira Forest; is a natural tropical rain forest in Central Uganda. The highway passes through the forest for over 30 kilometres (19 mi) between Lugazi and Njeru. (15) Njeru Town; is the largest town in Buikwe District. (16) Nalubaale Power Station; Uganda's oldest public hydropower station was commissioned in 1954. The highway passes over the dam. (17) Kiira Power Station; was commissioned in 2003. The highway passes within 2 kilometres (1.2 mi) of the dam and hydropower plant. (18) Nile Breweries Limited; is a subsidiary of Anheuser-Busch InBev. The highway passes next to the factory at Njeru. (19) The Source of the Nile lies approximately 3.6 kilometres (2.2 mi) south of the highway at Njeru.

== See also ==
- Kampala Northern Bypass Highway
- List of roads in Uganda
- List of cities and towns in Uganda
