= Mukono Town =

Urban centre in Uganda

Mukono
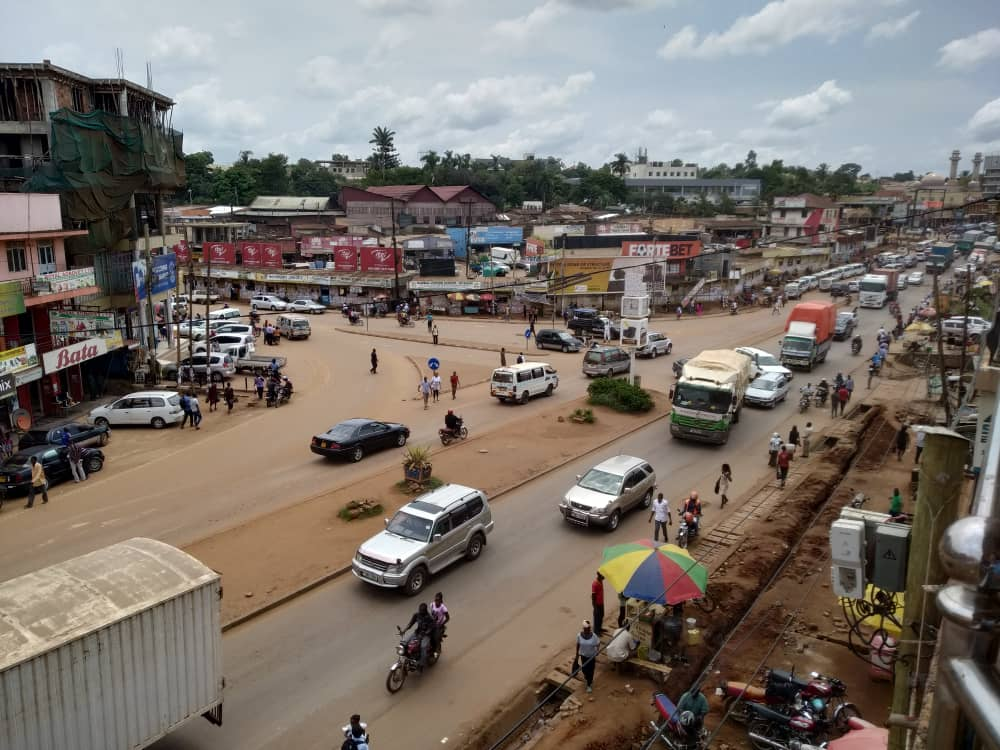
- Mukono, Uganda

- Map of Uganda showing the location of Mukono.
- Coordinates: 00°21′36″N 32°45′00″E
- Country: Uganda
- Region: Central Region
- District: Mukono District

Area
  - Total: 151 km^{2} (58 sq mi)
- Elevation: 1,246 m (4,088 ft)

Population (2024 Census)
  - Total: 305,945
  - Density: 2,026/km^{2} (5,250/sq mi)
- Time zone: UTC+3 (EAT)

Mukono Town is a municipality in Mukono District in the Central Region of Uganda. The town is administered by the Mukono Town Council. The district headquarters are located in this town.

== Location ==
Mukono Municipality is 21 kilometres (13 mi) east of Kampala along the Kampala-Jinja Highway. It is bordered by Kalagi to the north, Kira Town to the west, Lake Victoria to the south, and Lugazi to the east.

The town occupies approximately 31.4 square kilometres (12.1 mi^{2}) of land area. Mukono Town sits at an average elevation of 1,246 metres (4,088 ft), above mean sea level.

== Demographics ==
Mukono is one of Uganda's fastest growing urban areas. The 2002 national census estimated the population of the town at 46,506. In 2010, the Uganda Bureau of Statistics (UBOS) estimated the population at 57,400. In 2011, UBOS estimated the mid-year population at 59,000. On 27 August 2014, the national population census put the population at 162,710. In 2024, as conducted and published by UBOS through the Country's National Population and Housing Census 2024, Mukono's population has seen a drastic increase in its population which now stands at 929,224 residents and 273,966 households.

Historical population
Year	Pop.	±%
1969	3,565	—
1980	5,783	+62.2%
1991	7,406	+28.1%
2002	91,568	+1136.4%
2014	162,710	+77.7%
2020	191,300	+17.6%

== Organizational structure ==
The Mukono Municipality administration is divided into (a) the political arm headed by the Mayor, (b) the technical arm headed by the Town Clerk and the legislative arm, headed by the Speaker of the town council. The council is the supreme policy-making organ in the town. It is composed of 26 elected councilors. Members of the town council serve four-year terms. The mayor of the town is elected to a five-year term by universal adult suffrage using a secret ballot. The technical staff of the town council are headed by the town clerk under whom there are four municipal departments: the Management Department, the Treasury Department, the Public Health Department, and the Engineering Department.

== Points of interest ==
The following additional points of interest are located within the town limits or close to its edges:

1. Mukono Central Market

2. Uganda Christian University, a private university affiliated to the Church of Uganda

3. Namilyango College - the oldest boys boarding high school in Uganda, located 8 kilometres (5.0 mi), by road, south-west of Mukono

4. Kampala-Jinja Highway, passing through the center of town in a general west to east direction

5. Mukono Health Centre IV

7. The Ssamba Foundation

8. Abacus Parenteral Drugs Limited, a pharmaceutical company that manufactures intravenous fluids and sterile water for use in injections, ear drops, and eye drops.

== See also ==
- List of cities and towns in Uganda
- Namilyango College
