= Mukono District =

District in Uganda

- District
- District location in Uganda
- Coordinates: 00°28′50″N 32°46′14″E
- Country: Uganda
- Region: Central Region of Uganda
- Capital: Mukono

Area
  - Land: 1,875.1 km^{2} (724.0 sq mi)
- Elevation: 1,200 m (3,900 ft)

Population (2014 Census)
  - Total: 596,804
  - Density: 334.3/km^{2} (866/sq mi)
- Time zone: UTC+3 (EAT)
- Website: www.mukono.go.ug

Mukono is one of the districts in the Central Region of Uganda. The town of Mukono serves as the district headquarters and is home to the district's main commercial center.

== Location ==
Mukono District is bordered by Kayunga District to the north, Buikwe District to the east, Kalangala District to the south-west, Kira Town and Wakiso District to the west, and Luweero District to the north-west. The town of Mukono is about 21 kilometres (13 mi) by road, east of Kampala, the capital and largest city of Uganda. This is about 55 kilometres (34 mi) west of the town of Njeru, where the Nalubaale Power Station is situated, on the Kampala–Jinja Highway. The geographical coordinates of Mukono District are 00°28'50.0"N, 32°46'14.0"E (Latitude:0.480567; Longitude:32.770567).

== Demographics ==
The 1991 national population census estimated the district's population at 319,400. According to the 2002 census, the population was about 423,100, of whom 49.8 percent were males and 50.2 percent were females. At that time, its population growth rate was estimated at 2.7 percent per annum. In 2012, the population was estimated at 551,000. In August 2014, the national population census and household survey, enumerated the district inhabitants at 596,804. According to the 2024 national population, Mukono district has a demographic population of 305,945; with a total number of males at 145,278 and females at 160,667.

== Tourist attractions ==
The district is endowed with favorable climate, abundant rainfall, rich flora and fauna, and proximity to urban areas. The major tourist attractions in the district include the following:

=== Lake Victoria ===
Lake Victoria is the largest lake in Africa and the second largest fresh-water lake in the world. Many water sports are available there. Lakeside leisure sites are also available.

=== Sezibwa Falls ===
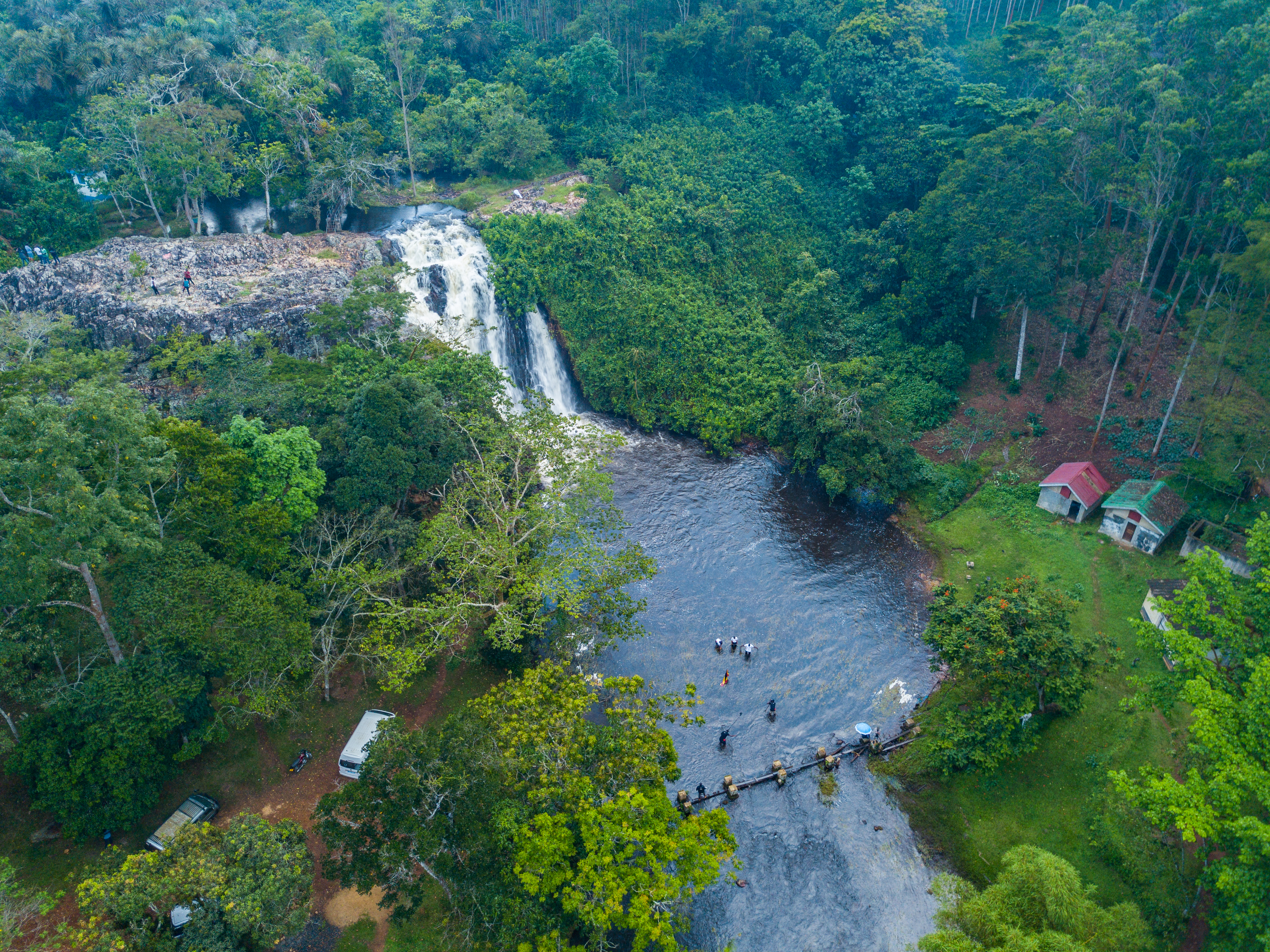
The Ssezibwa Falls located 35km east of Kampala in Mukono district is about seven meters high with the sweet hissing sound created by the falling water. The falls have a cultural and traditional bearing in the region and on the Baganda in particular due to the myths behind the formation of the Ssezibwa River. It is believed that this river, together with another called Bwanda was born by a Woman on her way to a place called Kavuma Bukunja many hundred years ago .

In the middle of the district runs the River Sezibwa, believed by Buganda legend to have been born by Nakangu Tibatesa, the wife of Nsubuga Sebwaato in Kawuna, Ngongwe, around the time of the Christian biblical prophet Isaiah. The river flows into Lake Kyoga. The nature of its birth makes the river a cultural symbol of great importance to Buganda's heritage.

The Sezibwa Falls are 2.5 kilometres (1.6 mi) off the Kampala-Jinja Highway, 19 kilometres (12 mi) east of the town of Mukono. The site also has a natural forest reserve, which has forest trails and nature walkways for birdwatching and forest exploration. Over 100 bird species and some wild animals, including rare species of monkeys, may be found at this location.

The Sezibwa Falls are also a cultural site of the Baganda and have cultural artifacts, including caves, 100-year-old trees, and special rocks of deep cultural significance to the Baganda of Buganda in central Uganda. It is one of the official cultural sites of the Buganda Kingdom.

== See also ==
- River Nile
- Districts of Uganda
- Zirimiti Forest Reserve
