= St. Mary's College Kisubi =

Coordinates: 00°07′17″N 32°32′00″E

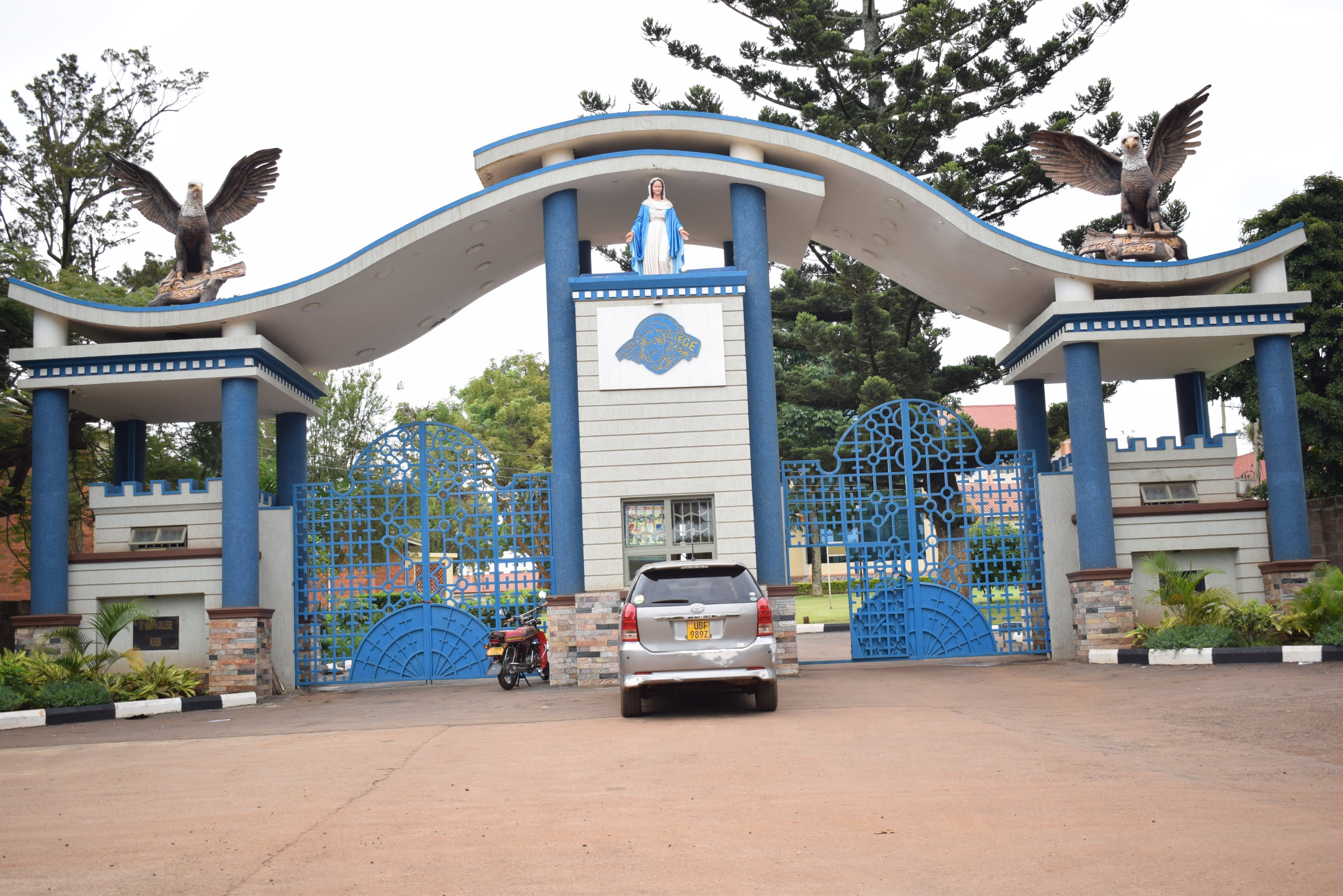
- The college's main gate.
- Kisubi, Wakiso District; Uganda

Information
- Type: Public All Boys high school (13-19)
- Motto: Duc in Altum (Launch in the Deep)
- Religious affiliation: Catholic Church
- Established: 1906
- Founder: Fr. Raux Modeste
- Enrollment: 1,400+ (2018)
- Houses: 4
- Colours: Blue and gold
- Athletics: Football, Rugby, track, Tennis, Volleyball, Basketball, Hockey and Swimming
- Nickname: SMACK, Eagles, Weevils
- Rivals: Namilyango College, King's College Budo
- Publication: The Eagle
- Alumni: Smackists

St. Mary's College Kisubi (SMACK) is a private, boarding, middle and high school located in Wakiso District in the Central Region of Uganda. It was established in 1906.

== Location ==
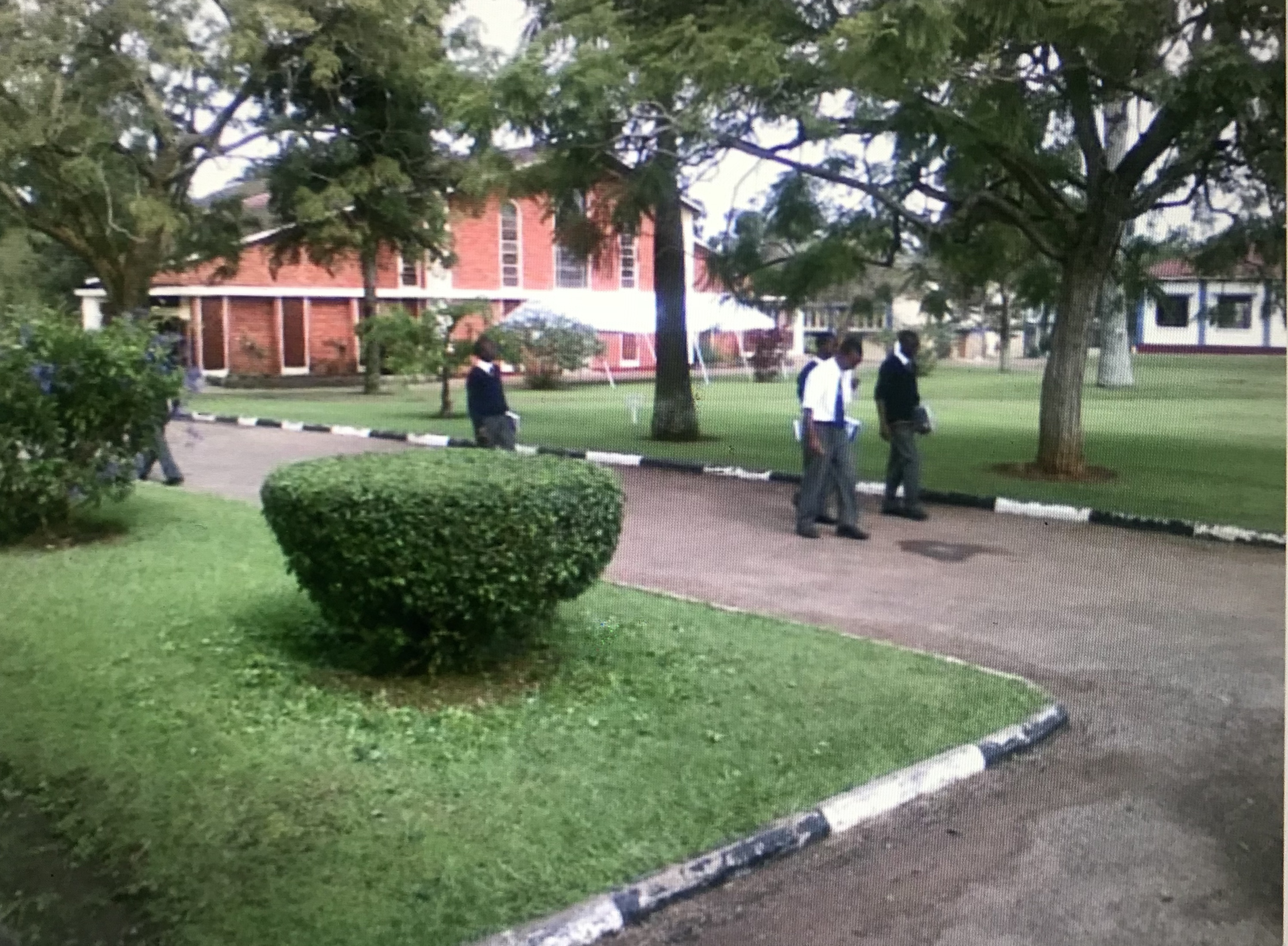
SMACK Campus

The school is in Kisubi along the Kampala–Entebbe Road, approximately 24 kilometres (15 mi), by road, south of Kampala, Uganda's capital and largest city. This is approximately 14 kilometres (8.7 mi), by road, north of Entebbe International Airport, the main civilian and military airport in Uganda. The coordinates of the college are 0°07'17.0"N, 32°32'00.0"E (Latitude:0.121389; Longitude:32.533333).

== History ==
St. Mary's School was founded by Reverend Raux Modeste of the White Fathers Congregation in 1906 and was named after its patroness, Saint Mary. Today, the Catholic Archdiocese of Kampala owns St. Mary's College Kisubi (SMACK). At the beginning of 1899, the Catholic chiefs in the Buganda Kingdom, under the leadership of Chief Stanislas Mugwanya, raised the question of higher education for Catholic youths in the kingdom. Their request was laid for consideration by the August Assembly of the White Fathers' General Chapter at Algiers in 1900. Out of those efforts, SMACK was founded.

== Reputation ==
According to a 2018 published report, St. Mary's College Kisubi is the most prestigious school in Uganda, owing to its excellent academic performance and all round nurturing of its students. The school offers education that encourages independent thinking and development.

St. Mary's started out occupying only about 10 buildings. The oldest of them was the two-storeyed dormitory for Senior One and Two students that was later brought down and replaced by the current Chemistry Laboratory. The administration block remains unchanged from back in the day. Standing at the centre of the college, it serves as the most centralised block on campus.

== Houses of Residence ==
Throughout its history, St. Mary's College Kisubi has maintained four houses of residence. A fifth residential house, the Centenary HSC Hostel, is occupied by A'Level students.

1. Lourdel House - named after Fr. Simon Mapeera Lourdel, the first Roman Catholic Missionary in Uganda
2. Mugwanya House - named after Stanislaus Mugwanya, former Mulamuzi (Chief Justice) of Buganda and a leading Catholic regent to Kabaka Daudi Chwa II
3. Kakooza House - named after the first native(African/Ugandan) Head Prefect of the College
4. Kiwanuka House - named after Archbishop Joseph Kiwanuka, the first native African to be appointed Archbishop of the Roman Catholic Church in East Africa

== Uniform ==
The SMACK students from 1906 to the early 1960s wore a pair of shorts and a white shirt as their uniform. Those who could afford a pair of shoes did wear them and others stayed barefooted. With many years of development, the uniform and the badge inclusive have had to succumb to many changes in design. The students today don a white shirt with a plain navy blue tie for ordinary level students, a striped tie for the advanced level students and a pair of grey trousers. Blazers have since become mandatory for all higher school certificate students.

Lord Snowdon, in 1964, commissioned the SMACK memorial library, after the death of 12 students in a motor accident. Some of these students were part of the school football team that had gone to participate in a tournament at which they emerged victors. Cheering on the way back from the match, Milton Obote's army suspected them to be rebels and the school lorry, which with the school bus was carrying the students, was knocked down by the army truck. In addition to the 12 deaths, an even greater number was injured that day. Today, the twelve trees planted also in memory of these students still stand tall right next to the Senior Six block.

The ever growing college, alongside its infrastructural developments, saw the introduction of a number of sports like basketball, football, swimming and hockey.

St. Mary's youngest building sits atop Kisubi hill as the tallest one yet. The new three-storied building, valued at Ugandan Shs.2.9 billion, serves as the new HSC block, replacing and outcompeting the older single-storied S5 block which stood erect since the introduction of the Higher School Certificate in SMACK in the recent past.

== Alumni ==
The SMACK Old Boys' Association (SMACKOBA), founded in 1918, has been involved in the running of the school in one way or another right from its foundation in the latter half of the 20th century. Called upon in the 60s, the Old Boys took charge of the c of a circular profile, but because of cost, the current plan was taken up depicting a gallant eagle in flight.

Notable alumni of St. Mary's College Kisubi (Old Smackists) include three Vice Presidents of Uganda, four Prime Ministers of Buganda Kingdom, two Attorneys General, a Speaker of Parliament, Cabinet ministers, judges, lawyers, entrepreneurs, renown creative artists and distinguished academics.

=== Politics ===
- Edward Ssekandi – former vice president of Uganda, 2011-2021, and former Speaker of Parliament, 2001-2011
- Gilbert Bukenya – former vice president of Uganda, 2003 – 2011
- John Babiiha – former vice president of Uganda, 1966-1971
- Paul Kawanga Ssemogerere – former member of parliament representing North Mengo, 1962–1966; President of the Democratic Party 1972–1986 and 2001–2005; presidential aspirant in 1986 and 1996
- Henry Kajura – 2nd Deputy Prime Minister and Minister of Public Service, since 2006
- Matia Kasaija – current Minister of finance of Uganda
- Hilary Onek – Current Minister for Relief, Disaster Preparedness and Refugees; represents Lamwo County in the Uganda Parliament, since 2011
- Omara Atubo – former Minister of Lands, Housing and Urban Development, 2006–2011; former member of parliament for Otuke County, 1987–2016
- Gerald Karuhanga – member of parliament representing Ntungamo municipality, 2016–2031
- Vincent Kaheeru - current member of parliament for Kyaka North
- Solomon Osiya - current member of parliament for Toroma County
- Charles Ayume - current member of parliament for Koboko Municipality
- Gerald Kasigwa - current member of parliament for Kigorobwa County
- Shyaka Bashaija - current member of parliament for Entebbe Municipality
- Otto Makmot - current member of parliament for Agago County
- Hassan Fungaroo - current member of parliament for Obongi County
- Michael Mabikke – former member of parliament Makindye East, and former president of the Social Democratic Party
- Baguma Isoke - former chairman of Uganda Land Commission, 2013-2019
- Andrew Ojok Oulanyah - member of parliament representing Omoro County, 2022 - 2031
- Boniface Okot - Youth Member of Parliament for Northern Region, 2021 - 2026

=== Buganda Kingdom ===
- Charles Peter Mayiga – Katikkiro (Prime Minister) of the Kingdom of Buganda, May 2013–present
- JB Walusimbi – Former Katikkiro (Prime Minister) of the Kingdom of Buganda, 2008-2013
- Emmanuel Lujumwa Ssendaula - former Acting Katikkiro (Prime Minister) of the Kingdom of Buganda, 2007-2008
- Joseph Mulwanyamuli Ssemwogerere - Former Katikkiro (Prime Minister) of the Kingdom of Buganda, 1994-2005
- Prince Kassim Nakibinge, a royal of the Kingdom of Buganda, CEO of Cairo International Bank, and "titular head" of Muslims in Uganda
- Prince Robert Masamba Kimera, elder brother to Kabaka Ronald Muwenda Mutebi
- Owek. Matayo Mugwanya, Mulamuzi (Chief Justice) of Buganda Kingdom 1950-1955
- Owek. Rauli Kiwanuka, Mulamuzi of Buganda Kingdom 1935-1945 and WWI veteran with the African Native Medical Corps

=== Law and judiciary ===
- Francis M. Ssekandi, 1975-1981, Judge High Court, Justice of the Court of Appeal.
- Joseph Mulenga - former Attorney General of Uganda, 1986-1988, Justice of the Supreme Court, 1996-2008.
- William Byaruhanga – former Attorney General of Uganda, 2016-2021
- Remmy Kasule - judge who served as Justice of Court of Appeal of Uganda
- Justice Oscar John Kihika, Justice of Court of Appeal.
- John Mike Musisi - Justice of Court of Appeal of Uganda
- Mike Elubu, Judge of the High Court of Uganda.
- Phillip Mwaka- Judge of the High Court of Uganda.
- Karoli Lwanga Ssemogerere - Acting Judge of the High Court of Uganda
- Isaac Ssemakadde - Current President of Uganda Law Society, founder & CEO of Legal Brains Trust

=== Academia ===
- Charles Olweny, Chancellor Mbarara University
- Dr. Alex Countinho, Executive director, Partners in Health Uganda
- Paul D'Arbela, Professor of medicine and Dean of Postgraduate studies at Uganda Martyrs University
- Patrick Edrin Kyamanywa, Vice Chancellor Uganda Martyrs University
- James Gita Hakim, professor of medicine, cardiologist and HIV clinical trialist
- Michael B. Nsimbi PhD, Luganda language scholar and historiographer
- Francis Omaswa, Consultant cardio-thoracic surgeon. Professor of medicine and surgery
- Gabriel Kariisa, PhD, Economist, former senior level international executive, AfDB
- John Ddumba Ssentamu, PhD Economist, former vice Chancellor Makerere University and board chairperson Centenary Group

=== Sports ===
- William Blick, Current Chairman of Uganda Olympic Committee, and former president of Uganda Rugby Union, 2006-2013
- Ivan Magomu, former captain of Uganda National 15's Rugby Team
- Jean Baptiste Okello, Former high-hurdler, Olympic semi-finalist, Rome, 1960

=== Writers ===
- Okello Oculi, novelist, poet and chronicler of African village life
- Eneriko Seruma, author and playwright
- Robert Serumaga, playwright

=== Innovation ===
- James Byaruhanga, founding partner of Roke Telkom
- Professor Patrick Engeu Ogwang, inventor of Covidex, a herbal formulation notified by the National Drug Authority for supportive treatment in managing viral infections.
- Davis Musinguzi - Founder & former CEO of Rocket Health Africa
- Michael Okea - Founder of SynbioEco advancing water quality testing biosensors for carcinogenic poly aromatic hydrocarbons

=== Military ===
- Muhoozi Kainerugaba, first son and Chief of Defence Forces
- Kale Kayihura, retired General of Uganda People's Defence Force, former Inspector General of Police 2005–2018

=== Pilots ===
- Captain Robert Wakhweya, Chief Pilot of Uganda Airlines
- Captain Patrick Mutayanjulwa, a seasoned pilot with Uganda Airlines

=== Businessmen / Managers ===
- Francis Kitaka – founder and Chairman of Quality Industries Limited
- Frederick Kitaka – chief financial officer of Quality Chemical Industries Limited, currently the only company in Sub-Saharan Africa that manufactures triple-combination anti-retroviral drugs
- Charles Mbire – entrepreneur, businessman and industrialist; reportedly the wealthiest indigenous Ugandan; shareholder and Chairman of MTN Communications Company
- Philip Besiimire - Managing Director of Vodacom Tanzania since October 2022
- Joseph Yiga - Founder of Steel and Tube Industries Ltd
- Louis Kasekende - Economist, former Deputy Governor Bank of Uganda
- Julius Kakeeto - CEO of PostBank Uganda, and chairman of Uganda Banker's Association
- Claver Serumaga - CEO of NCBA Bank Tanzania
- Simon Kagugube - former chairman of the board of directors at Uganda Revenue Authority, 2016-2020, former Executive Director of Centenary Bank, 2003-2020
- Charlie Lubega - Proprietor Club Guvnor

== See also ==
- Education in Uganda
- Wakiso District
- St. Joseph's College, Ombaci
