= MV Pemba =

Ugandan ship

History
- Name: MV Pemba
- Operator: Uganda Railways Corporation
- Port of registry: Port Bell, Uganda
- Route: Port Bell, Uganda – Mwanza, Tanzania on Lake Victoria.
- Completed: circa 1984
- Status: suspended from service since 2005

General characteristics
- Type: train ferry
- Installed power: diesel
- Propulsion: screw
- Capacity: Four tracks with total capacity for 22 or 40 railway wagons

MV Pemba is a Lake Victoria ferry that was operated by the Uganda Railways Corporation. Registered in Port Bell, Uganda, the ship's regular route was between Port Bell and Mwanza, in Tanzania.

== 2005 incident ==
At about 0300 hrs on 8 May 2005 Pemba was en route to Mwanza in Tanzania when her sister ships MV Kaawa and MV Kabalega collided with each other. Pemba received a distress call, put about, and reached the scene of the collision "one and a half hours" later. Kabalega was sinking so Pemba positioned herself alongside, rescued her eight officers and 16 crew and landed them back at Port Bell in Uganda.

It was later established that all three Ugandan vessels; Kaawa, Kabalega and Pemba had no marine insurance at the time of the accident. The insurance policy for the three vessels had expired in December 2004 and had not been renewed. After the collision Kaawa was withdrawn from service for repairs to her bow and Pemba was suspended from service, due to lack of radar and other modern navigational aids.

== Proposed return to service ==
In September 2005 Uganda's minister of works, John Nasasira, claimed that structural repairs Kaawa's collision damage and to her sister ship Pemba were almost complete but that USh 3.4 billion (approx. US$1.85 million at that time), was needed "to fully repair and maintain, class and insure the vessels". By October 2009 the two ferries were still out of service but Nasasira claimed the Government would recondition both vessels and would return Pemba to service in 2010 and Kaawa in 2011. As of August 2018, both MV Kaawa and MV Pemba remain unrepaired and out of service.
