= Uganda Joint Medical Store =

Ugandan charitable organization

Joint Medical Store (JMS)
- Company type: Corporate Body
- Industry: Drug procurement, storage and distribution
- Founded: 1979; 47 years ago
- Headquarters: 1828 Gogonya Road, Nsambya, Kampala, Uganda
- Key people: Bildard Baguma; Executive Director & CEO; Sam Orach; Executive Secretary
- Products: Human medication, healthcare supplies, furniture and equipment
- Number of employees: 200
- Website: Homepage

The Joint Medical Store (JMS), is a non-government organisation in Uganda, mandated to procure, store and distribute human medication and health-related consumable items to health units. It is owned by the Uganda Catholic Medical Bureau and the Uganda Protestant Medical Bureau, the two entities who own the NGO.

== Location ==
The headquarters of the JMS are located at 1828 Gogonya Road, in Nsambya, in the Makindye Division of Kampala, Uganda's capital and oldest city. The geographical coordinates of the company headquarters are 00°17′46″N 32°35′43″E.

The organization maintains a branch office and warehouse at 24 Ruharo-Bushenyi Road in the city of Mbarara, in the Western Region of Uganda. Their third office and warehouse are located at Block 3, Ragem Road, Arua City, in West Nile sub-region, in the Northern Region of Uganda.

Plans are underway to establish branch offices and warehouses in Gulu, and Mbale. In August 2022 JMS broke ground on a 2,000 square metres (21,528 sq ft) building to house the warehouse of their Gulu branch. Construction is expected to last about one year at a budgeted cost of UGX:7 billion (approx. US$2 million).

== Overview ==
JMS is a joint venture company, created in 1979 by the Uganda Catholic Medical Bureau and the Uganda Protestant Medical Bureau. JMS operates as a non-profit, Corporate body registered under the Trustees Incorporation Act Cap 165. JMS procures, stores and distributes human medication and related healthcare equipment and supplies to the hospitals and health facilities in the private non-profit health sector.

JMS offers free installation, servicing and maintenance on equipment purchased from JMS or any of their authorized distributor. In December 2017, they began manufacturing nutritional supplements, clinical oxygen and medical sundries.

== Governance ==
The organization is governed by a board of trustees and a board of directors. The day-to-day operations of JMS are managed by a 15-person management team, led by Bildard Baguma, the executive director.

== See also ==
- Uganda National Medical Stores
- National Food and Drug Authority
- Quality Chemical Industries Limited
