= MV Kabalega =

Coordinates: 0°39′23″S 32°8′41″E

History
- Name: MV Kabalega
- Operator: Uganda Railways Corporation
- Port of registry: (Uganda)
- Route: on Lake Victoria between Port Bell, Uganda & Mwanza, Tanzania
- Completed: circa 1983–86
- Fate: Sunk after collision 8 May 2005

General characteristics
- Type: train ferry
- Installed power: diesel
- Propulsion: screw
- Capacity: four tracks with total capacity for 22 or 40 railway wagons

MV Kabalega was a Lake Victoria ferry operated by the Uganda Railways Corporation.

== 2005 collision ==
In the early hours of 8 May 2005 she was involved in a collision with MV Kaawa. Kabalega was en route to Port Bell in Uganda while Kaawa was sailing in the opposite direction towards Mwanza in Tanzania. Kaawa damaged her bow and Kabalega was damaged below the waterline. Kaawa managed to return to port but a few hours after the collision Kabalega sank in 150 feet (46 m) of water about 8 nautical miles (15 km) southeast of the Ssese Islands and about 50 nautical miles (93 km) from the Kuye Islands.

Kabalega was a train ferry. Her cook, George Saka, reported that at about 0300 hrs. Kaawa struck Kabalega's bow, dislodging the railway wagons that were secured to Kabalega's deck into the water. Saka told Uganda's New Vision newspaper that the collision tore open Kabalega's bow and also ruptured her #8 buoyancy tank and water also rapidly entered the #9 tank.

A distress message was radioed to a third Ugandan ferry, MV Pemba, which was en route to Mwanza ahead of Kaawa. Pemba put about and reached the scene of the collision "one and a half hours" later according to Saka. Pemba then positioned herself alongside Kabalega, rescued her eight officers and 16 crew and landed them at Luzira in Uganda.

If the collision took place at about 0300 hrs and Saka's account is correct, Pemba's rescue of Kabalega's crew would have been at about 0430 hrs. However, Lake Rescue East Africa states that it received a distress call at 0900 hrs that morning and "responded to the call within one hour of it being received". Lake Rescue states that Kabalega sank at 1137 hrs.

URC's chairman Paul Etiang admitted that marine insurance for Kaawa, Kabalega and Pemba had expired in December 2004 and not been renewed. After the collision Kaawa was withdrawn from service for repairs to her bow and Pemba was suspended from service.

A commission of enquiry attributed the collision to inadequately trained crew on the bridges of both ferries and a lack of communication equipment. It also noted that both ferries had been involved in previous collisions, a previous incident report had been published a decade earlier but its recommendations had not been implemented. The report also highlighted the absence of a search and rescue unit that could have reached the sinking ferry soon enough.

== Options for replacement ==
Three years after Kabalega sank, Uganda's National Budget Framework Paper for the Financial Year 2008-09 said it was a "matter of urgency" to provide a replacement train ferry to "provide resources for the development of an alternative route through the port of Dar es Salaam". In May 2008 Uganda's Daily Monitor reported that The Minister of Finance, Ezra Suruma, was expected to announce in that year's budget speech a government allocation of USh 14 billion to buy a new train ferry to replace Kabalega.

However, in September 2009 Uganda Radio Network reported that the Ugandan Government was unlikely to replace her soon. Instead, Uganda's minister for works John Byabagambi proposed to improve port facilities at Jinja and Port Bell and allow private operators to run railway car floats with greater capacity than the ferries. Mr Byabagambi stated that Kaawa and Pemba would be reconditioned and returned to service and that private businesses had expressed an interest in raising Kabalega and restoring her to use as a private concession.
