= Quality Chemicals Limited =

Ugandan pharmaceutical company

- Type: Private
- Industry: Pharmaceutical Industry
- Founded: 1997; 29 years ago
- Headquarters: Katwe, Kampala, Uganda
- Key people: Francis X Kitaka (chairman); Emmanuel Katongole (managing director & CEO)
- Services: Pharmaceutical marketing & distribution

Quality Chemicals Limited (QCL) is a Ugandan pharmaceutical, life sciences, and distribution company. The company was formed in 1997, specializing at first in the importation of generic human and veterinary medication. Its headquarters are located on Katwe Road, in the neighborhood known as Katwe in Makindye Division in the southern part of Kampala, Uganda's capital and largest city.

== Quality Chemical Industries Limited ==
In 2003, discussions began between QCL and the Indian pharmaceutical company Cipla, with the blessing of the Government of Uganda, to establish a joint-venture company in Uganda that would manufacture triple therapy anti retroviral drugs and double therapy antimalarial medication for use in Uganda and nearby countries. Quality Chemical Industries Limited was registered formally on 10 June 2005, with equal shareholding between Cipla and QCL. Later, the Capitalworks International Partnership Fund of South Africa and United Kingdom-based TLG Capital acquired minority shareholding in the joint venture. In 2013, QCL ceded 14.45 percent shareholding to Cipla, making the Indian pharmaceutical company the majority shareholder. The name of the company was changed to Cipla Quality Chemical Industries Limited to reflect the new ownership structure.

== Ownership ==
The shareholding in the stock of Quality Chemicals Limited included the six shareholders who founded the business in 1997. In May 2015, Cipla agreed to pay US$30 million for 51 percent shareholding in Quality Chemicals Limited. The transaction was expected to close by July 2015. The shareholding in the company is illustrated in the table below:

Shareholding in Quality Chemicals Limited
Rank	Name of owner	Percentage ownership
1	Cipla of India	51.00
2	Randall Tierney	8.17
3	Edward Martin	8.17
4	Francis Kitaka	8.17
5	Emmanuel Katongole	8.17
6	Frederick Kitaka	8.17
7	George Baguma	8.17
	Total	100.00

- Note: Totals are slightly off due to rounding.
