= MV Kaawa =

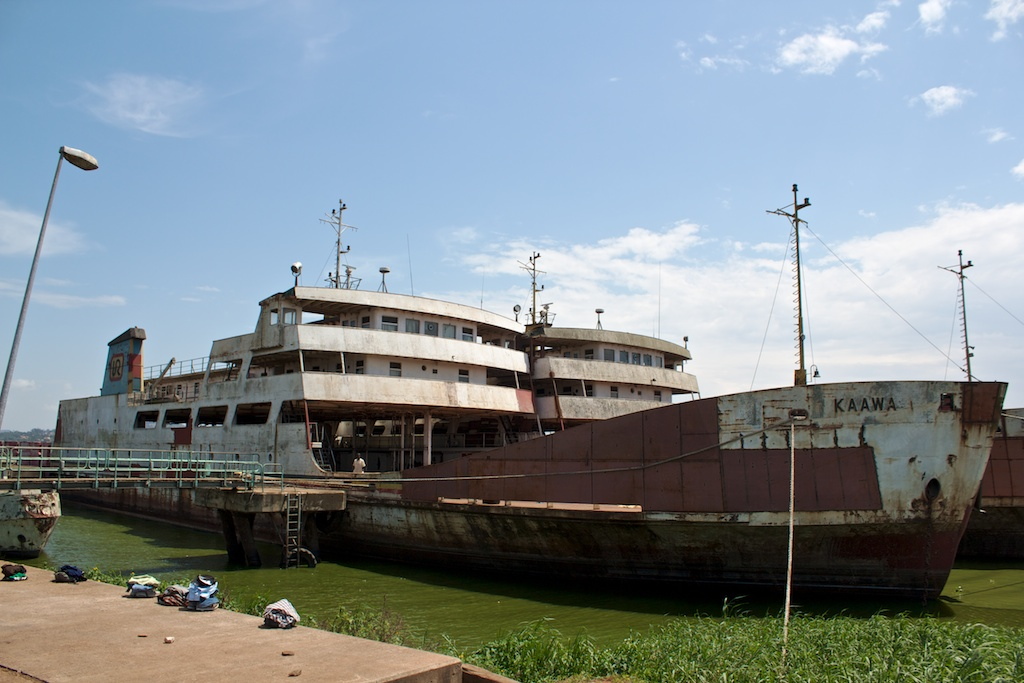

History
- Name: MV Kaawa
- Operator: Uganda Railways Corporation
- Port of registry: (Uganda)
- Route: on Lake Victoria between Port Bell, Uganda & Mwanza, Tanzania
- Completed: circa 1983–86
- Fate: damaged in collision 8 May 2005
- Status: suspended from service since 2005

General characteristics
- Type: train ferry
- Installed power: diesel
- Propulsion: screw
- Capacity: four tracks with total capacity for 22 or 40 railway wagons

MV Kaawa is a Lake Victoria ferry that was operated by the Uganda Railways Corporation.

== 2005 collision ==
In the early hours of 8 May 2005 Kaawa was en route to Mwanza in Tanzania when she was involved in a collision with MV Kabalega, which was en route to Port Bell in Uganda. Kaawa damaged her bow and Kabalega was damaged below the waterline. Kaawa managed to return to port but a few hours after the collision Kabalega sank about 8 nautical miles (15 km) southeast of the Ssese Islands.

URC's Chairman of Governors Paul Etiang admitted that marine insurance for Kaawa, and Kabalega and their sister ship MV Pemba had expired in December 2004 and not been renewed. After the collision Kaawa was withdrawn from service for repairs to her bow and Pemba was suspended from service.

The collision was at about 0300 hrs when Kaawa's third officer, Stephen Kaliisa, was on watch. Kaliisa told a Ugandan Parliamentary committee that Kaawa had no navigation lights and one of her radars was missing. Maritime convention is that ships passing each other in opposite directions should pass on each other's starboard side. However, Kaliisa told the committee that Kaawa had lacked a starboard navigation light "for a long time".

Kaliisa also told the committee that three years before the collision he had been appointed as third officer despite being only a sailor with no marine training or qualifications. Kaawa's First Officer, Samuel Kyabukulu, told the committee that Kaliisa was not qualified to steer the ship. Despite this, Kaawa's master, Captain Albert Ocaya, told the committee "When I handed over the ship (i.e. to Kaliisa), I did not expect anything strange" and "If Kaliisa had notified me about the trouble, the accident would have been averted". However, as master, Ocaya would have been responsible both for Kaawa sailing in darkness without navigation lights, without one of her radars, and with a third officer who had none of the necessary qualifications.

A commission of inquiry attributed the collision to inadequately trained crew on the bridges of both ferries and a lack of communication equipment. It also noted that both ferries had been involved in previous collisions, a previous incident report had been published a decade earlier but its recommendations had not been implemented. The report also highlighted the absence of a search and rescue unit that could have reached the sinking ferry soon enough.

== Proposed return to service ==
In September 2005 Uganda's minister of works, John Nasasira, claimed that structural repairs Kaawa's collision damage and to her sister ship Pemba were almost complete but that USh 3.4 billion was needed "to fully repair and maintain, class and insure the vessels". By October 2009 the two ferries were still out of service but Nasasira claimed the Government would recondition both vessels and would return Pemba to service in 2010 and Kaawa in 2011.
