= Uganda National Medical Stores =

Ugandan government-owned organisation

Coordinates: 00°03′49″N 32°28′13″E

National Medical Stores (NMS)
- Type: Parastatal
- Industry: Drug procurement, storage and distribution
- Founded: 1993; 33 years ago
- Headquarters: 4-12 Nsamizi Road, Entebbe, Uganda
- Key people: Jotham Musinguzi (chairman); Moses Kamabare (general manager & CEO)
- Products: Human medication
- Website: Homepage

The Uganda National Medical Stores, commonly referred to as National Medical Stores (NMS), is a government-owned organisation in Uganda, mandated to procure, store and distribute human medication and health-related consumable items to government-owned health units in all districts of Uganda.

== Location ==
The headquarters of the NMS is located at 4-12 Nsamizi Road, in Entebbe, a city on the northern shores of Lake Victoria, approximately 34 kilometres (21 mi), southwest of Kampala, the capital and its largest city. The coordinates of the head office are 0°03'49.0"N, 32°28'13.0"E (Latitude:0.063611; Longitude:32.470278). It was reported in Ugandan media in May 2018, that NMS would re-locate its headquarters from Entebbe to Kajjansi, upon the completion of construction of the new logistics center at the new location in 2019.

National Medical Stores maintains regional offices at the following locations:

1. Entebbe Head Office: Entebbe, Central Uganda
2. Arua Regional Office: Arua, West Nile
3. Gulu Regional Office: Gulu, Northern Uganda
4. Hoima Regional Office: Hoima, Western Uganda
5. Kabarole Regional Office: Fort Portal, Western Uganda
6. Kampala Regional Office: Kampala, Buganda Region
7. Mbale Regional Office: Mbale, Eastern Uganda
8. Mbarara Regional Office: Mbarara, Western Uganda
9. Moroto Regional Office: Moroto, Northern Uganda
10. Soroti Regional Office: Soroti, Eastern Uganda

The agency works in collaboration with the Uganda Ministry of Health and all healthcare facilities, including health centers IIs, IIIs and IVs, general hospitals, regional referral hospitals and national referral hospitals.

== Overview ==
NMS was created by the Ugandan legislature in 1993.

== Governance ==
The agency is governed by a 15-person board of directors, who serve for a four-year renewable term. The board includes the following individuals, effective August 2018.

- Jotham Musinguzi: chairman
- Medard Bitekyerezo
- Hanifah Namaala Sengendo
- Samuel Orochi
- Justinian Niwagaba
- Laban Mbulamuko
- Kenneth Omoding
- Kate Nalukenge
- Naome Kibaaju
- Christine Ondoa
- Richard Mugahi
- Emmanuel Osuna
- Beatrice Lagaba
- Shaban Abdullah
- Timothy Musila

== Kajjansi Logistics Centre ==
As of November 2017, NMS was in the process of constructing a modern pharmaceutical and medical equipment warehouse in the town of Kajjansi, approximately 21 kilometres (13 mi), by road, northeast of the NMS headquarters in Entebbe.

The new warehouse is partly funded by the Global Fund, which has contributed US$7.6 million and by the GAVI international vaccination initiative, which contributed US$1.5 million. Completion was slated for June 2019.

In November 2018, GAVI approved US$5.6 million (USh:21 billion) and the Uganda government committed USh:20 billion (US$5.4 million) towards the construction of the facility. At the time of its commissioning, Ugandan media reported that the warehouse and office complex cost USh:69 billion (approx. US$18.5 million) to construct.

The facility, which sits on 10 acres (4 ha) of land, will be mounted with solar panels capable of generating 300kV of electricity, providing 50 percent of the energy needs of the project. The warehouse will have a vaccine workshop, a quality control laboratory, offices for more than 200 staff, cold storage rooms, garages and space to accommodate 30,000 pallets of medication. In comparison, the storage in Entebbe can accommodate a maximum of only 12,980 pallets.

== See also ==
- Economy of Uganda
- Uganda Joint Medical Store
- Quality Chemical Industries Limited
- National Food and Drug Authority
