= Francis Kitaka =

Ugandan biochemist and veterinarian

- Born: 1 January 1935; Uganda
- Died: 12 September 2020 (aged 85)
- Citizenship: Uganda
- Education: Aberdeen University (Bachelor of Science in Biochemistry); Makerere University (Diploma in Veterinary Medicine
- Occupations: Biochemist & Veterinarian & Entrepreneur
- Years active: 1961 — 2020
- Known for: Entrepreneurship & Industrial Innovation
- Title: Former Chairman; Quality Chemical Industries Limited

Francis Xavier Kitaka (1 January 1935 – 12 September 2020) was a Ugandan biochemist, veterinarian, entrepreneur and industrialist. He is the former chairman of Cipla Quality Chemical Industries Limited (CIPLAQCIL), located in Luzira, a suburb of Kampala, Uganda's capital and largest city. CIPLAQCIL is the only company in Sub-Saharan Africa, that is authorized to manufacture triple therapy antiretroviral drugs.

== Background and education ==
He was born in 1935, in a family of six siblings, to Celestino Mayambala Musoke and Monica Musoke. Francis Kitaka attended Rubaga Primary School, starting in 1944. 1948 Kitaka was admitted to Bukalasa Minor Seminary, but was expelled in 1950, for wearing bathroom sandals to Church. The following year, 1951, he was admitted to Rubaga Boys' Secondary School, where he sat his middle school examinations in 1952. He entered St. Mary's College Kisubi in 1952 and left in 1954 after sitting his O Level examinations (Cambridge Ordinary School Certificate Examinations). In 1955, he was admitted to the Faculty of Science at Makerere University for the intermediate course for two years. This was equivalent to Advanced Level (A Level) studies. In 1957 Kitaka entered the Department of Veterinary Medicine, to study for the Diploma in Veterinary Medicine, which he obtained in 1958. In 1961 he received a scholarship from the Government of Uganda to study Biochemistry at the University of Aberdeen in Scotland. After graduation, Kitaka became the first African biochemist in East Africa.

== Work history ==
In 1961, prior to his departure for Scotland for further studies, he worked at the Animal Health Research Centre in Entebbe. While in Scotland, he worked at Rowett Research Institute in Aberdeen for eight years, before returning to Uganda in 1968. Upon his return, he worked at the Tick Control Department in the Ministry of Agriculture, as an Entomologist. In 1972, Francis Kitaka joined Wellcome Uganda Limited, as the Sales Manager.

In 1989, Kitaka and two colleagues, Edward Martin and Randall Tierney, bought Wellcome East Africa Limited and renamed it Cooper Uganda Limited. In 1994, they bought the building housing their offices and rebranded to MTK Holdings Limited, representing the first letter of each of their last names.

In 1997, with three more investors; George Baguma, Frederick Kitaka and Emmanuel Katongole, the group of six investors created Quality Chemicals Limited (QCL), a company whose initial objective was to import generic drugs, both veterinary and human into the country. In 2003, the shareholders in QCL learned through the Indian High Commissioner to Uganda, that Cipla, the Indian pharmaceutical company was looking for a serious pharmaceutical company to partner with in Uganda. They flew to India and signed partnership and marketing agreements. That was the beginning of the importation of Cipla-manufactured pharmaceuticals into Uganda.

They convinced Cipla to build a factory to manufacture ARVs in Uganda. QCL bought a piece of land in 2004 and on 3 September 2005, President Yoweri Museveni performed the ground breaking ceremony. The factory was commissioned in 2007. The pharmaceutical plant is owned by a new entity called Quality Chemical Industries Limited, in which Cipla and Quality Chemicals Limited own equal shares. The plant is operated by QCL. Francis Xavier Kitaka has served as chairman of the board of directors of QCIL from 2007 until November 2013.

In 2013, Cipla acquired majority shareholding in QCIL, and changed the name of the company to CIPLAQCIL. At that time the Chairmanship changed to Emmanuel Katongole. Francis X Kitaka remained a shareholder in the business.

== Illness and death ==
Francis X Kitaka died on 12 September 2020. At the time of is death, MTK Holdings Limited, which he co-owned, was a shareholder or outright owner of several businesses including: 1. Quality Chemicals Limited 2. Mosquito Net Village Limited, a manufacturer of mosquito nets 3. Tinosoft Limited, an ICT business that also invests in commercial real estate.

== See also ==
- CIPLAQCIL
- Cipla
- Frederick Kitaka
- George Baguma
- Emmanuel Katongole
- Luzira
- HIV/AIDS Management
