= Butabika =

- Map of Kampala showing the location of Bukabika.
- Coordinates: 00°19′12″N 32°39′27″E
- Country: Uganda
- Region: Central Uganda
- District: Kampala Capital City Authority
- Division: Nakawa Division
- Elevation: 1,180 m (3,870 ft)
- Time zone: UTC+3 (EAT)

Butabika is a location in south-eastern Kampala, the capital city of Uganda.

== Location ==
Butabika is bordered by Bweyogerere to the north, Kirinnya, a Ward in Kira Municipality to the east, Luzira and Port Bell to the south, Mutungo to the west and Kireka in Kira Municipality to the northwest. This location is approximately 12 kilometres (7.5 mi), by road, east of Kampala's central business district. The coordinates of Butabika are:0°19'12.0"N, 32°39'27.0"E (Latitude:0.3200; Longitude:32.6575). Butabika lies approximately 1,180 metres (3,870 ft) above sea level.

== Overview ==
Butabika is the location of the largest mental health hospital in Uganda, with an estimated bed capacity of 900. Butabika National Referral Hospital is the country's only referral hospital specializing in mental health. Prior to 2005, the hospital owned the entire area consisting of over 300 acres (120 ha). In 2005, about half of that land was sold to private individuals and institutional developers. One of those developers is Nationwide Properties, a subsidiary of Property Services Limited, develops and sells new homes as well as providing multiple facilities to the area. Nationwide has constructed a housing estate consisting of upscale housing units on 150 acres (61 ha) of prime land, adjacent to Lake Victoria.

== Points of interest ==
The following points of interest lie in Butabika or near its borders:

- Butabika National Referral Hospital - The largest mental health facility in Uganda and the only national mental health referral hospital in the country, admitting in excess of 6,000 mental health patients annually.
- The Institute of Clinical Psychiatric Officers (ICPO) - A Uganda Government-owned school that trains Clinical Psychiatric Officers, administered by the Uganda Ministry of Health.
- Biina Catholic Cathedral - A place of worship affiliated with the Catholic Church.
- Royal Palms Housing Estate - An upscale private real estate development by the Mukwano Group of Companies.

== See also ==
- Nakawa Division
- Uganda Hospitals
- Kampala
- Lake Victoria
