= Emmanuel Katongole (businessman) =

Ugandan businessman

- Born: 27 April 1962 (age 64); Uganda
- Citizenship: Uganda
- Education: Namilyango College (Uganda Certificate of Education) (Uganda Advanced Certificate of Education); Makerere University (Bachelor of Statistics) (MA economic policy & planning)
- Occupation: Business executive
- Years active: 1990s–present
- Known for: Investments
- Title: Chief executive officer Quality Chemical Industries Limited

Emmanuel Katongole (born 27 April 1962), is a Ugandan statistician, economist, businessman, entrepreneur and industrialist. He is the executive chairman of Cipla Quality Chemical Industries Limited (CQCIL), the only company in Sub-Saharan Africa, that is authorized to manufacture triple-combination anti retro-viral drugs. Since 2014, he has also been the chairman of the Uganda National Oil Company.

== Education ==
He attended Namilyango College for his secondary education. He studied at Makerere University, graduating with the degree of Bachelor of Statistics (B.Stat). His Master of Arts in economic policy and planning was also obtained from Makerere University. He has attended numerous other short-term courses in economics, statistics and management, from institutions in Uganda and Europe.

== Work history ==
In 1997, Katongole, Randall Tierney, Francis X. Kitaka, Frederick Mutebi Kitaka and George Baguma, founded a company called Quality Chemicals Limited (QCL). The company specialized in the importation of generic veterinary and human pharmaceuticals from India. Katongole was managing director and chief executive officer as well as a shareholder from 1997 until 2007. In 2004, QCL convinced Cipla, the Indian drug maker, to form a joint venture and set up a pharmaceutical factory in Uganda. Ground was broken in 2005 and the factory was commissioned in 2007. The joint venture was originally known as Quality Chemical Industries Limited. Katongole was the chief executive officer of QCIL from 2007 until 2013.

In November 2013, Cipla took a controlling majority interest in QCIL, renaming the company CIPLAQCIL and appointing Katongole the executive chairman of the company. He remains a shareholder in the business. In July 2014, President Yoweri Museveni appointed Katongole as chairman of the Uganda National Oil Company.

== Business interests ==
Katongole owns the following businesses either wholly or in part:

- Vero Food Industries Limited – located at Kampala's Industrial and Business Park, Namanve, Wakiso District
- Tinosoft Limited – an information technology company, located in Kampala
- Quality Chemical Industries Limited – a manufacturer of antimalarial and antiretroviral medications; located in Luzira, [Kampala

== Other responsibilities ==
He is a member of the Initiative for Global Development (IGD) – Frontier 100, a group that joins the most successful business leaders operating in frontier markets, with business leaders from Europe and the United States. The governing council of IGD was co-chaired by Madeleine Albright and General Colin L. Powell, both former secretaries of state of the United States of America. Katongole is a Rotarian and is a member of the Rotary Club of Muyenga. He was also the district governor for Rotary District 9211, which comprises Tanzania and Uganda. He was also appointed chairperson of the National Response Fund to Covid-19 by the president of Uganda on 8 April 2020. He was also the chairperson for the installation of the new Archbishop of Kampala, His Grace Dr. Paul Ssemogerere, held on 25 January 2022. Katongole, a staunch Roman Catholic, was in February 2021 named as one of the eight parishioners that were to be conferred the award of papal knighthood.
