= Etheldreda Nakimuli-Mpungu =

Ugandan Mental health programme developer

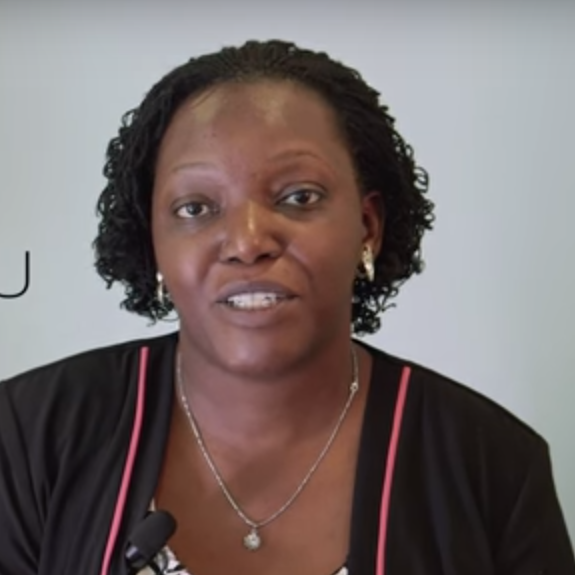
- Born: 1974 (age 51–52)
- Education: Makerere University; Johns Hopkins University
- Occupations: Psychiatrist; Academic; Mental health advocate
- Employer: Makerere University
- Awards: Elsevier Foundation Award (2016); BBC 100 Women (2020)

Etheldreda Nakimuli-Mpungu (born 1974) is a professor, researcher, epidemiologist and psychiatrist at the Department of Psychiatry in the Faculty of Medicine, Makerere University in Uganda. Her research is particularly focused on supportive group psychotherapy as a first-line treatment for depression in people with HIV. She is one of only five recipients of the Elsevier Foundation Award for Early Career Women Scientists in the Developing World in Biological Sciences, as well as listed at one of the BBC's 100 Women in 2020.

== Education ==
Nakimuli-Mpungu graduated with a bachelor's degree in Medicine and Surgery from Makerere University's Faculty of Health Sciences in 1998. When she announced the news to her mother, her mother replied: "OK, good. But you know it's not good just to be a doctor, you go to some doctors and they don't make you feel better. I want you to be one of the doctors who really do good for people". Her career began in Kampala, where she worked first in a surgical department, then with children. From 2001 to 2012 she worked in psychiatric care at Butabika National Referral Mental Hospital. In 2006, she is also resumed graduate studies in psychiatry at Makerere University's College of Health Sciences and was awarded an MA. In 2012, she was awarded a doctorate in psychiatric epidemiology from Johns Hopkins University.

== Career ==
While working at Butabika Hospital, Nakimuli-Mpungu noticed a large number of HIV/AIDS patients were being admitted with serious mental health problems. Nakimuli-Mpungu commented that "at the time, nobody knew how to help them or what to do with them", specifying that "there was this idea in the medical community that these people were beyond all help". She undertook her own observations, which confirmed the HIV-positive individuals are more likely to be diagnosed with depression, in part due to the stigma surrounding the disease. One symptom of depression is neglect of self-care, which means for some HIV patients, they are less likely to take their medication. Nakimuli-Mpungu felt that there could be a dual approach to the two diseases, but there was nothing published in scientific literature at the time, which could serve as a basis for implementation of such a treatment.

Nakimuli-Mpungu then launched a research programme to explore the possibilities of a treatment that addressed both issues. Since most medical centres in Uganda lack funding, as well as training for and staff to work on mental health care, Nakimuli-Mpungu focussed on the potential of group therapy as a treatment. Her first pilot recruited 150 people with HIV and depression. The recruits were split into two groups: one group received Nakimuli-Mpungu's group therapy sessions, the other standard HIV education sessions at a clinic. Whilst over time all patients depression decreased, significantly the group therapy's trend was a continuation of decrease of depression even after the sessions ceased.

This initial study led to a larger programme, which began in 2016. In this iteration, 1140 patients were treated at more than 40 health centres across northern Uganda. The participants were again split into two: one half received "culturally appropriate psychotherapy", the others received general HIV education. The treatments this time were provided by trained, non-professional healthcare workers over a course of eight weeks. The group that received psychotherapy showed less incidences of major depression than the other group, reduced symptoms of PTSD, greater adherence to medication courses, lower rates of alcohol abuse, amongst other outcomes. Positive affects were greatest amongst male patients.

As of 2020 she is a professor, researcher, epidemiologist and psychiatrist at the Department of Psychiatry in the Faculty of Medicine, Makerere University.

== Awards ==
- The International ASTRAZENECA/APIRE Young Minds in Psychiatry Award, 2005.
- The International Fulbright Science & Technology Award, 2007.
- Presidential National Independence Medal of Honor, Uganda, 2016.
- Elsevier Foundation Award for Early Career Women Scientists in the Developing World in Biological Sciences, 2016.
- BBC's annual most influential 100 Women list, 2020.

== Selected publications ==
- 'Effectiveness and cost-effectiveness of group support psychotherapy delivered by trained lay health workers for depression treatment among people with HIV in Uganda: a cluster-randomised trial' (co-authored) in The Lancet (February, 2020).
- 'Group support psychotherapy for depression treatment in people with HIV/AIDS in northern Uganda: a single-centre randomised controlled trial' (co-authored) in Lancet HIV (May, 2015).
- 'Depression, alcohol use and adherence to antiretroviral therapy in sub-Saharan Africa: a systematic review' (co-authored) in Aids Behaviour (November, 2012).
- Urgently seeking efficiency and sustainability of clinical trials in global health. (co-authored) in The Lancet Global Health (May, 2021)
- Health-related quality of life among patients with bipolar disorder in rural southwestern Uganda: a hospital based cross sectional study. (co-authored) in Health and quality of life outcomes (2021).
- Long-Term Effect of Group Support Psychotherapy on Depression and HIV Treatment Outcomes: Secondary Analysis of a Cluster Randomized Trial in Uganda. In Psychosomatic Medicine (2022).
- Black American maternal prenatal choline, offspring gestational age at birth, and developmental predisposition to mental illness. Schizophrenia Bulletin (2020).
- The impact of group counseling on depression, post-traumatic stress and function outcomes: A prospective comparison study in the Peter C. Alderman trauma clinics in northern Uganda. In Journal of Affective Disorders.
- How COVID-19 has fundamentally changed clinical research in global health. In The Lancet Global Health (2021).
- Association of task-shared psychological interventions with depression outcomes in Low- and Middle-Income Countries: A systematic review and individual patient data meta-analysis. In JAMA Psychiatry (2022).
- The role and challenges of cluster randomised trials for global health. In The Lancet Global Health (2021).
- Effectiveness and cost-effectiveness of group support psychotherapy delivered by trained lay health workers for depression treatment among people with HIV in Uganda: a cluster-randomised trial. In The Lancet Global Health (2020).
- Mental health interventions for persons living with HIV in low- and middle-income countries: a systematic review. In Journal of the International AIDS Society (2021).
- Prevalence and factors associated with depression symptoms among school-going adolescents in Central Uganda. In Child and Adolescent Psychiatry and Mental Health (2016)

== Also see ==
- Butabika Hospital
