= Charlie Lubega =

Ugandan rally driver

- Education: Makerere University
- Occupation: Former rally driver
- Known for: Winning the Pearl of Africa Rally

Charlie Lubega is a Ugandan former rally driver who won the Pearl of Africa Rally championship in 2000, 2003, and 2004. He holds the record for the highest average speed (176km/h) in the Africa Rally Championship event.

== Education ==
Lubega studied Economics and Political Science at Makerere University.

== See also ==
- Uganda National Rally Championship
- African Rally Championship
- Ponsiano Lwakataka
- Susan Muwonge
