= David Nahamya =

Ugandan pharmacist and drug-regulation specialist

- Citizenship: Ugandan
- Education: University of Havana, University of Cape Town, Uganda Management Institute, Eastern and Southern African Management Institute
- Occupations: Pharmacist, drug-regulation specialist
- Years active: 2001–present
- Employer: National Drug Authority Uganda
- Known for: Secretary to the National Drug Authority Uganda
- Title: Secretary to the National Drug Authority

David Nahamya is a Ugandan pharmacist and drug-regulation specialist who serves as the Secretary of the National Drug Authority (NDA).

== Education background ==
Nahamya studied at Kigezi High School where he completed his O-level in 1978 and King's College Budo where he completed his for A-level in 1984. He then went to the University of Camagüey in Cuba, where he pursued a diploma in Spanish in 1989 and in 1990, he obtained a Master's degree in Pharmaceutical Sciences from the University of Havana.

In 1999, he obtained a postgraduate diploma in Management from Uganda Management Institute (UMI) and he later obtained a Master's degree in Health Economics from the University of Cape Town. In 2009, Nahamya completed a Master's in Business Administration at ESAMI.

== Career ==
Nahamya joined the National Drug Authority in April 2001 as an Inspector of Drugs and was posted to the Eastern Region as a regional inspector before becoming the Acting Senior Inspector of Drugs in 2004. In 2006, he became Regional Inspector of Drugs for the Central Region and in 2008, he became a Senior Inspector of Drugs.

In 2017, he became Acting Head of Drug Inspectorate Services before he was appointed as the Director of Inspectorate and Enforcement in July 2017. In February 2019, he began serving as the Acting Secretary to the National Drug Authority. On 1 August 2019, Nahamya was appointed as the Secretary to the National Drug Authority.
