= Eneriko =

Eneriko is a given name. Notable people with the name include:

- Eneriko Buliruarua (born 1997), Fijian rugby union player
- Eneriko Seruma (born 1944), Ugandan poet
