= Uganda Nurses and Midwives Council =

Statutory professional regulatory body

Agency overview
- Formed: 1996; 30 years ago
- Jurisdiction: Government of Uganda
- Headquarters: Kampala, Uganda
- Parent agency: Ministry of Health, Government of Uganda
- Website: https://unmc.ug/

Uganda Nurses and Midwives Council (UNMC) is a statutory professional regulatory body in Uganda, established under the Nurses and Midwives Act, 1996.

== Location ==
The Uganda Nurses and Midwives Council is located in Kampala, Uganda, with its offices along Makerere Hill Road in the Kawempe Division area.

== History ==
The Council evolved through several stages of legislative reform. It began in 1922 under colonial health administration structures regulating nurses and midwives. Following independence, reforms led to the Nurses and Midwives Act of 1996, which consolidated regulation under a single body, the Uganda Nurses and Midwives Council. The Act strengthened professional standards, training regulation, licensing systems, and disciplinary mechanisms for nurses and midwives across Uganda's health sector.

== Administration ==
The UNMC is governed by a governing council, the highest decision-making body responsible for setting policies, standards, and regulatory guidelines for nursing and midwifery practice in Uganda. The Governing Council comprises official representatives from key institutions such as the Ministry of Health, training institutions, referral hospitals, and professional nursing associations.

The day-to-day administration is handled by the secretariat headed by the registrar, who serves as the chief executive officer of the council. The current registrar is Christine Nimwesiga, appointed with effect from 10 November 2021, responsible for licensing, maintaining professional registers and implementing council decisions. The former acting registrars were Stella Josephine Namatovu and Rebecca Nassuna, who served UNMC from 2017 to 2018 in an acting capacity, overseeing administrative functions of the Council.

== See also ==
- Uganda Ministry of Health
- National Drug Authority
