= James Gita Hakim =

Zimbabwean cardiologist and HIV researcher (1954–2021)

- Born: 14 May 1954; Anglo-Egyptian Sudan
- Died: 26 January 2021 (aged 66); St. Anne's Hospital, Harare, Zimbabwe
- Education: St. Mary's College Kisubi (High School Diploma); Makerere University (Bachelor of Medicine and Bachelor of Surgery); University of Nairobi (Master of Medicine in Internal Medicine); University of Newcastle School of Medicine and Public Health (Master of Medical Science in Clinical Epidemiology); Royal College of Physicians (Fellow of the Royal College of Physicians); University College London (Doctor of Medicine)
- Occupations: Internist; Cardiologist; Researcher; Academic
- Years active: 1979–2021
- Known for: Medical practice and research
- Title: Professor of Medicine and Former Chair of Internal Medicine at the University of Zimbabwe College of Health Sciences

James Gita Hakim (14 May 1954 – 25 January 2021) was a Zimbabwean internist, clinical epidemiologist, cardiologist, researcher, university faculty and academic mentor. At the time of his death, he was Professor of Medicine and Former Chair of Internal Medicine at the University of Zimbabwe College of Health Sciences.

== Background and education ==
Hakim was born in Anglo-Egyptian Sudan on 14 May 1954. He migrated to Uganda when still a young boy. He was educated at St. Mary's College Kisubi, for his secondary school education, from S1 to S6. He then entered Makerere University School of Medicine, graduating in 1979, with a Bachelor of Medicine and Bachelor of Surgery degree.

After a year of internship, he continued his medical education by obtaining a Master of Medicine degree in Internal Medicine, from the University of Nairobi, in Kenya. He then studied and passed the examinations leading to the award of the title Member of the Royal College of Physicians. Later, he was elected Fellow of the Royal College of Physicians. He also held a Master of Medical Science degree in Clinical Epidemiology, obtained from the University of Newcastle School of Medicine and Public Health in Australia. He attended a post-doctoral fellowship in cardiology, at Aachen, Germany. He also successfully undertook a Health Professionals Education course at the University of Cape Town. At a graduation ceremony in 2016, Professor Hakim was nominated for the award of a Doctor of Medicine degree by the University College London.

== Career ==
Hakim joined the University of Zimbabwe College of Health Sciences (UZCHS) in 1992. He rose through the ranks to serve as the Chair of Medicine at the college as of 2001. He was also a Principal Investigator and Site Leader within the Harare-based University of Zimbabwe-University of California San Francisco Clinical Trials Unit. He served as Programme Director of the PERFECT Programme, a National Institutes of Health-sponsored advanced junior faculty research training initiative at UZCHS.

He was an active clinician researcher, called upon to investigate HIV/AIDS prevention and therapeutics, including co- infections, shortly after joining UZCHS. Hakim was the first director of and helped to build the University of Zimbabwe Clinical Research Centre (UZ-CRC). He served as a member of the UNAIDS expert committee on HIV/AIDS. At the time of his death, he was the elected African representative on the Governing Council of the International AIDS Society.

== Other considerations ==
Hakim was the recipient of the 2019 Ward Cates Spirit Award at the 2019 HIV Prevention Trials Network' Annual Meeting in Washington, D.C. He was acknowledged for his "outstanding commitment and leadership to health as a right, scientific excellence, and generosity in mentorship and support".

== Death ==
After a period of hospitalization for about two weeks, at St. Anne's Hospital in Harare, Zimbabwe's capital city, Hakim died from complications of COVID-19, on 26 January 2021.

Hakim was survived by his wife and four sons. At the time of his death, he had acquired Zimbabwean naturalized citizenship.

== See also ==
- Betty Mpeka
