= Susan Muwonge =

Ugandan Female Rally Driver

- Born: 1977 (age 48–49); Buddo, Wakiso District, Uganda
- Other names: Super Lady; Queen of Speed
- Education: Makerere University (BBA); Kyambogo University (Bachelor's in Early Childhood Education); Makerere University (Master's)
- Occupations: Rally driver, teacher, educationist
- Years active: 2005–present
- Known for: First woman to win the Uganda National Rally Championship (2011); two-time champion (2011, 2018)
- Spouse: Lawrence Muwonge (m. 1997)
- Children: 5 (including Filbert Lawrence Muwonge and Thecla Mary Nalwanga, d. 2025)
- Awards: Uganda Sports Press Association accolade (2011); Uganda Sports Press Association Personality of the Year (2012)

Susan Muwonge (born in 1977) is a Ugandan rally driver and teacher. Called 'Super Lady' and "Queen of Speed", in 2011 after becoming the first female to win the Uganda's national rally championships.

== Education ==
Muwonge was born to her father Kitonsa Fred and her late mother was Namukasa Regina and she went to St Mary's Primary School Nabbingo for her primary school, completed her Uganda Certificate of Education) from St Henry's Buyege Girls’ Secondary School and her Uganda Advanced Certificate of Education (from Gombe Secondary School. She attended Makerere University graduating with a Bachelor of Business Administration and then she joined Kyambogo University and attained a Bachelor's in Early Childhood Education.

== Career ==
Very soon after graduating, Muwonge and her husband Lawrence Muwonge started St Francis Junior School in Buddo Wakiso District. She bought her first racing car, Mitsubishi Evo 2 formerly driven by Jamil Ssenyonjo and started rallying in 2005. In her first race in Rakai, she finished in the sixth position. Her racing career officially began in 2007 at Garuga Racing Track. She became the first woman to win the National Rally Championship in November 2011, beating Ponsiano Lwakataka in the 300 km Independence Rally at the Festino City Race Circuit. When not rallying and teaching, Muwonge enjoys farming, acting and singing.

== Awards ==
- Uganda Sports Press Association accolade (October 2011)
- Uganda Sports Press Association Sports Personality of the Year (January 2012)

== See also ==
- Uganda National Rally Championship
- Ponsiano Lwakataka
- Ronald Ssebuguzi
