= George Baguma =

Ugandan businessman

- Born: 1960 (age 65–66); Uganda
- Citizenship: Uganda
- Education: Makerere University (Bachelor of Science) (Diploma in Education); Imperial College London (Master of Science in Entomology) (Doctor of Philosophy in Parasitology)
- Occupations: Scientist & entrepreneur
- Years active: 1980–present
- Known for: Investments
- Title: Chief commercial officer CIPLAQCIL
- Spouse: Mrs. Baguma

George W. Baguma, is a Ugandan businessman and entrepreneur. He is the current chief commercial officer and marketing director at Cipla Quality Chemical Industries Limited. George Baguma is a founder investor in QCIL and is a member of the company's board of directors.

== Education ==
He holds a bachelor's degree and a diploma from Makerere University, Uganda's largest and oldest public university. He also holds a masters of science in entomology degree and a doctorate of philosophy in parasitology degree from the Imperial College London.

== Work history ==
Before 2000, Baguma worked at the Uganda Ministry of Agriculture, Animal Industries and Fisheries, in the Directorate of Animal Resources, as a deputy commissioner. From 2000 until 2005, he served as the chief commercial officer at Quality Chemicals Limited. From 2005 until 2013, he served as chief commercial officer and director of marketing at Quality Chemical Industries Limited. He is also an investor in the business.

== See also ==
- CIPLAQCIL
- Cipla
- Frederick Kitaka
- Francis Kitaka
- Emmanuel Katongole
- Luzira
- HIV/AIDS Management
