= Patrick Ogwang =

Ugandan medical researcher, academic and entrepreneur

- Born: 1 January 1973 (age 53); Otuboi Village, Kaberamaido District, Uganda
- Citizenship: Uganda
- Education: Makerere University
- Occupations: Pharmacist; Pharmacologist; Medical researcher Entrepreneur
- Years active: 2004–present
- Title: Professor of Pharmacology at Soroti University; Associate professor of Pharmacology at Mbarara University; Principal investigator at Pharm-Bio Technology and Traditional Medicine Center; Executive chairman of Jena Herbals Uganda Limited

Patrick Engeu Ogwang (born 1^{st} January 1973) is a Ugandan pharmacist, pharmacologist, ethnobotanist, medical researcher, and entrepreneur who serves as the head of the Pharmacology Department at Soroti University. Prior to joining Soroti University, Professor Patrick Engeu Ogwang served as an associate professor and head of the Department of Pharmacy at Mbarara University in Uganda. He is also the executive chairman of Jena Herbals Uganda Limited, a private company he founded that manufactures Covidex, a herbal extract from three indigenous Ugandan plants, which has shown activity against a number of human viruses, including COVID-19.

== Background and education ==
Ogwang was born circa 1973 in Otuboi Village, in Kaberamaido District, in Uganda's Eastern Region. His father was an Itesot, while his mother was a Langi. His father died first, and then his mother died too. Ogwang was then raised by his uncle.

While growing up, Ogwang observed how his mother would preserve different herbs and prepare them for her children when they fell ill with minor ailments such as fever, stomach pains and upper respiratory infections. He later took a deep interest in these plants, including laboratory analysis.

After attending local primary school, he studied at St. Mary's College Kisubi, in Wakiso District, where he obtained his high school diploma in the mid 1990s. He was then admitted to Makerere University, where he graduated with a Bachelor of Pharmacy degree. He followed that with a Master of Pharmacology, from Makerere University as well. His third degree is a Doctor of Philosophy in Pharmacology from the same university.

== Research ==
Beginning circa 2004, Ogwang began serious study of the chemical compounds in the medicinal plants that were in his mother's first-aid kit. He began tinkering with various combinations and mixtures together with different concentrations and dilutions. He came up with a compound that has prevented one of his family members from suffering sickle cell crises for nearly twenty years. Another compound, when taken all year, provides immunity against contracting malaria.

Ogwang also took off time and volunteered at the National Chemotherapeutic Research Institute (NCRI), in Wandegeya, under Dr. Grace Nambatya Kyeyune.

== Covidex ==
In 2020, when a visiting American professor contracted COVID-19 in Uganda, Ogwang modified a concoction that he had been developing to treat viral mouth ulcers. He gave it to the American to drop into his nostrils several times a day. Prior research had shown that the mixture had antiviral properties. The visitor made a full recovery in short order. A colleague of the guest professor who had travelled with him to Uganda also fell ill with COVID-19 and was helped too, without having to be admitted.

In May/June 2021, when the delta variant of COVID-19 made its entry into Uganda, Ogwang shared his anti-COVID-19 nasal drops with some family members and close friends, and they all got better. Then Ogwang himself came down with COVID-19. He used his medicine, which he calls Covidex, to heal himself. After he had about 10 documented cases,he approached the National Drug Authority and was awarded a temporary emergency license while he arranged full clinical trials. Medical practitioners may use Covidex along with other treatment regimens since Covidex is known to have antiviral properties.

== Awards and honors ==
In April 2024, Ogwang was recognized as the "Most Outstanding In Complementary Medicine" at the third annual Africa Outstanding Professional Awards in a ceremony held at the Dar es Salaam Serena Hotel on 23 April 2024.
