= Uganda Railways Corporation =

State-owned railway company of Uganda

- Type: Government-owned corporation
- Industry: Railway transport
- Predecessor: East African Railways and Harbours Corporation
- Founded: 1977; 49 years ago
- Key people: David Musoke Bulega; Acting Managing Director
- Number of employees: 200+ (2018)

Flag of the URC

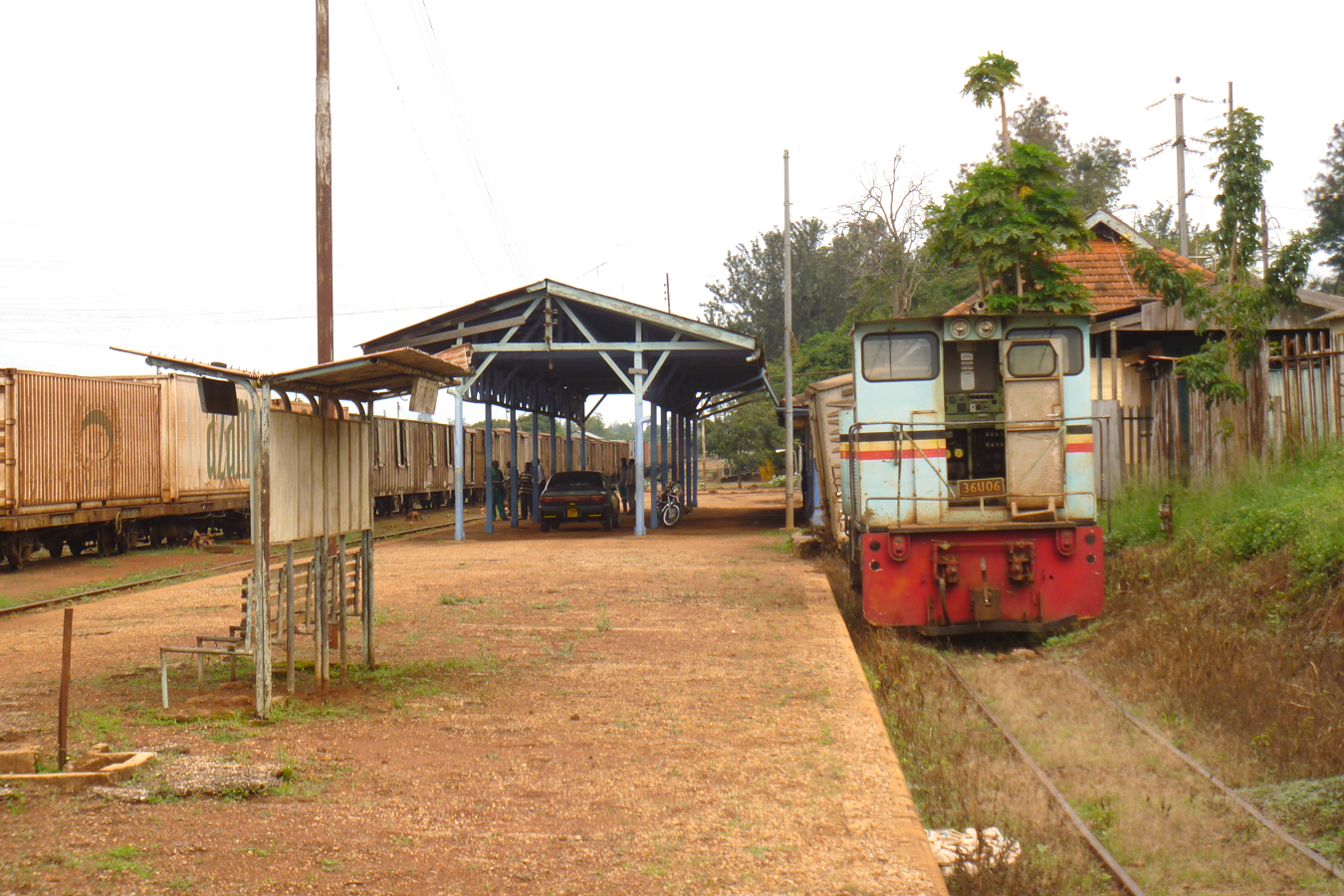
Tororo railway station

The Uganda Railways Corporation (URC) is the parastatal railway of Uganda. It was formed after the breakup of the East African Railways Corporation (EARC) in 1977 when it took over the Ugandan part of the East African railways.

URC's system is rooted in the British colonial 1,000 mm (3 ft 3 3/8 in) metre gauge Uganda Railway that was transformed after World War I into the EARC. Its operation after the demise of the EARC had been hampered by civil war and inefficient management in Uganda. In 1989, government soldiers massacred sixty civilians at Mukura railway station.

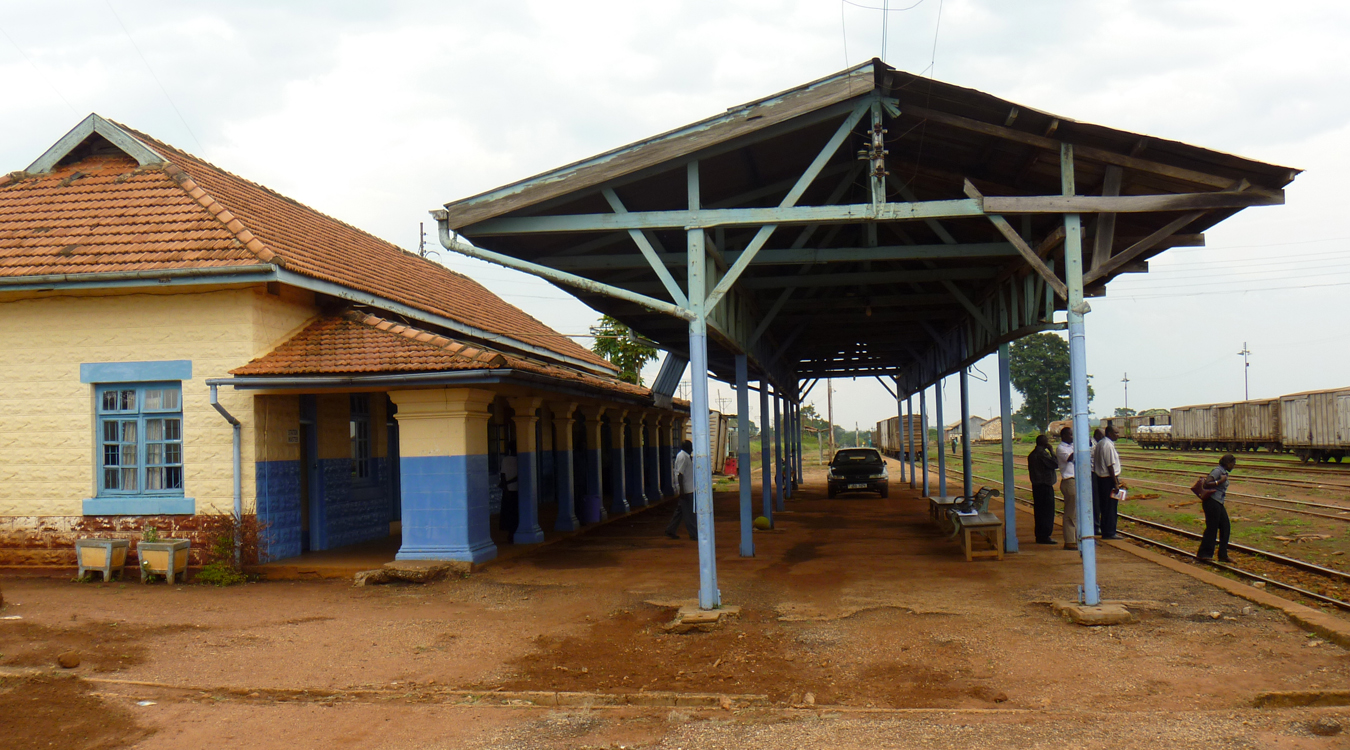
Tororo railway station

In 2023, Uganda Railways begun work on restoring its northern line to Gulu, eschewing the construction of a new standard gauge railway in favor of restoration of the existing one.

== South Africa's involvement ==
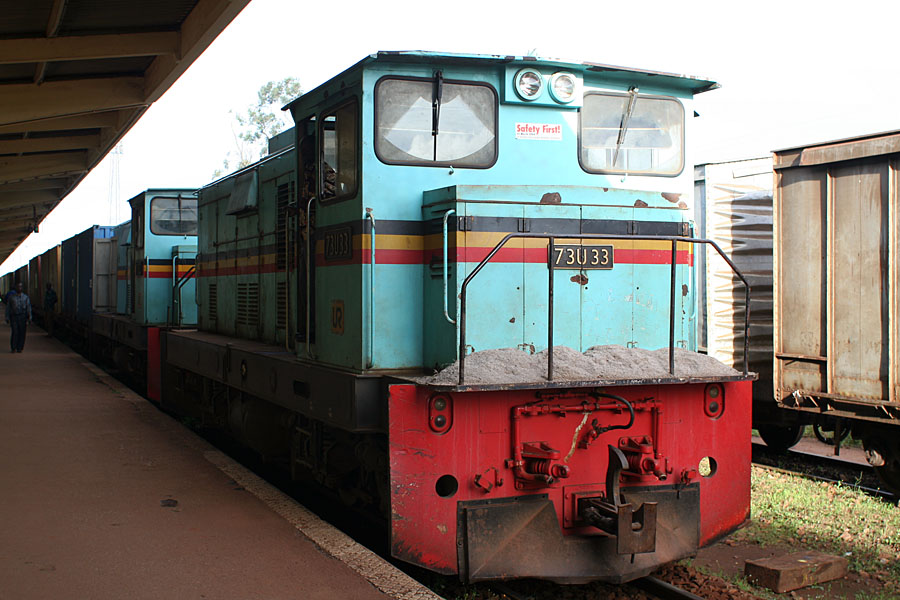
URC locomotive (73U21-33 Henschel DHG 1200 32949-61/1990 1250 hps) at Kampala station, Uganda

In 2005, the Rift Valley Railways Consortium (RVRC) from South Africa was awarded a concession to manage URC and Kenya Railways. RVRC was scheduled to take over operations on 1 August 2006. However, the East African Standard reported on 28 July 2006, that the take-over was postponed until 1 November 2006. It actually took place in November 2006 and was scheduled to last for 25 years.

== 2008 Kenya crisis ==
The 2007–2008 Kenyan crisis included destructive riots that blocked and partly destroyed the rail system linking Kenya and Uganda, leading to economic difficulties in supply for Uganda. Further, destruction and loss of income led to significant financial losses.

On 9 October 2008, Toll Holdings of Australia entered into a contract to manage the Kenya-Uganda railway, replacing management by RVRC. Officers from Toll subsidiary Patrick Defence Logistics would manage the railway after the transition.

== RVRC loses concession ==
In August 2017, Kenya terminated the RVRC concession, citing failure by RVRC's failure to perform as stipulated in the concession agreement. In October 2017, Uganda followed suit, but RVRC ran to court to stop the termination. In late February 2018, URC finally took possession of the concession assets and resumed operating the metre-gauge railway system in Uganda.

== Train ferries ==
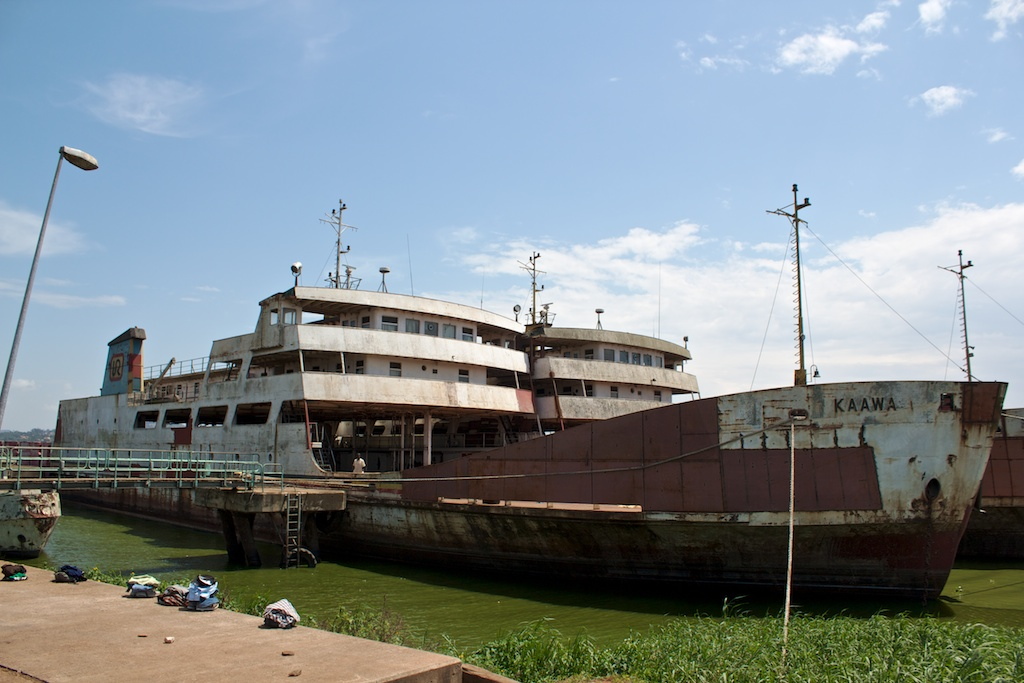
MV Kaawa

URC operated three international train ferries on Lake Victoria: MV Kabalega, MV Kaawa, and MV Pemba. On 8 May 2005, however, Kabalega and Kaawa collided almost head-on. Kaawa damaged her bow and Kabalega suffered damage to her bow and flooding in two of her buoyancy tanks. Kaawa returned to port, but a few hours after the collision, Kabalega sank about 8 nautical miles (15 km) south-east of the Ssese Islands.

In May 2008, the Daily Monitor stated that it expected the Ugandan government to announce in that year's budget speech a government allocation of UGX:14 billion to buy a new train ferry to replace Kabalega. In September 2009, however, the Uganda Radio Network said the Ugandan government was unlikely to replace Kabalega soon. Instead, the Minister of Works proposed to improve port facilities at Jinja and Port Bell and let private operators run railway car floats with greater capacity than the ferries. The minister stated that Kaawa and Pemba would be reconditioned and returned to service and that private businesses had expressed an interest in raising Kabalega and restoring her to use as a private concession. In October 2009, the Ugandan government reiterated that it would recondition the Pamba and Kaawa and return them to service in 2010 and 2011 respectively.

In June 2018, the EastAfrican, reported that 900-tonne MV Umoja, registered in Tanzania, began regular service between Mwanza and Port Bell, plying the route 26 times every month. It is also expected that MV Kaawa, registered in Uganda, will join MV Umoja on the route. The Dar es Salaam to Kampala route costs US$65 per tonne, compared to US$90 per tonne on the Mombasa to Kampala route, as of June 2018. The Citizen (Tanzania), reported similar information.

In February 2022, the newly reconditioned MV Pamba was introduced to the public and was commissioned for commercial services, after a period of 17 years' absence.

== ThyssenKrupp's Sudan-Uganda proposal ==
Until recently, only the 8 kilometres (5.0 mi) line between Kampala and Port Bell and the 190 kilometres (120 mi) main line from Kampala to the Kenyan border at Tororo remained in use. In October 2010, ThyssenKrupp subsidiary Gleistechnik reportedly was leading a project to link Juba, capital of South Sudan, with Gulu, a town in northern Uganda. After having been closed for years because of damaged infrastructure, the northern route to Gulu (from Tororo Junction on the main Kampala-Mombasa line) reopened in September 2013, with RVRC as the operator.

== Railway links with adjacent countries ==
- Kenya - yes - same gauge 1,000 mm (3 ft 3 3/8 in)
- Tanzania - no direct connection except via train ferry - same gauge 1,000 mm (3 ft 3 3/8 in)
- South Sudan - proposed - break of gauge 1,000 mm (3 ft 3 3/8 in)/1,067 mm (3 ft 6 in)
- Rwanda - no
- Congo - no - break of gauge

== Passenger service around Kampala ==
In February 2015, Rift Valley Railways, in collaboration with KCCA, began testing commuter passenger railway service in Kampala and its suburbs, with a view to establish regular scheduled service beginning in March 2015. Those services were temporarily discontinued after RVR lost its concession in Uganda in October 2017. However, when Uganda Railways Corporation took over the operations of the metre gauge railway system in Uganda in 2018, the service was restored in February that year. Commuters on the service appreciated the ease and reasonable fares of the rail transport, compared to the commuter taxis, with the attendant traffic jams. A new Kampala to Port Bell route is being planned, to be added in the 2018/2019 financial year.

== See also ==
- East African Railway Master Plan
- Kenya Railways Corporation
- Transport in Kenya
- Transport in Uganda
- Uganda Railway
- Uganda Standard Gauge Railway
