= Betty Mpeka =

Ugandan physician (1954–2021)

- Born: 1954; Uganda
- Died: 6 June 2021 (aged 67); Kampala, Uganda
- Cause of death: COVID-19
- Citizenship: Uganda
- Education: Makerere University (Bachelor of Medicine and Bachelor of Surgery); Liverpool School of Tropical Medicine (Master of Science in Public Health)
- Occupations: Physician and public health specialist
- Years active: 1980–2021
- Title: Former Deputy Chief of Party, Uganda Indoor Residual Spraying Project Phase II, at the Uganda Ministry of Health
- Spouse: Engineer Tusubira (died in the 1990s)

Betty Asiimwe Mpeka Tusubira (1 January 1954 – 6 June 2021; née Betty Asiimwe Mpeka), commonly known as Betty Mpeka, was a Ugandan physician and public health specialist, who at the time of her death, was the Deputy Chief of Party of Uganda Indoor Residual Spraying Project Phase II, at the Uganda Ministry of Health, based in Kampala, the capital of that East African country.

== Background and education ==
Mpeka was born in the Western Region of Uganda circa 1954. She attended elementary school locally. She attended Maryhill High School in the city of Mbarara, for her O-Level education. She then transferred to Gayaza High School in Wakiso District for her A-Level education. She was then admitted to Makerere University Medical School in 1974, where she graduated with a Bachelor of Medicine and Bachelor of Surgery degree in 1979. One of her classmates in medical school, was Professor James Gita Hakim (14 May 1954 – 25 January 2021), who also died from COVID-19, in Harare, Zimbabwe. Later, she graduated from the Liverpool School of Tropical Medicine, with a degree of Master of Science in public health. One of her classmates in this course was Dr. Ian Clarke, the proprietor of Clarke International University in Uganda.

== Career ==
After her first degree, Mpeka interned at Mulago National Referral Hospital. After internship, she was retained at Mulago, in the Department of Pediatrics. She also for a period of time served as the medical director of Kasangati Health Centre IV, a teaching institution of Makerere University College of Health Sciences (MCHS).

In the late 1980s she was hired by the Uganda Ministry of Health, rising through the ranks to the level of Commissioner of Health. She subsequently focused on malaria treatment and prevention. She was a member of the Uganda team that participated in the Uganda Program for Human and Holistic Development (UPHOLD), between 2002 until 2008. The program was funded by the United States Agency for International Development (USAID). From 2012 until her death, she served as the Deputy Chief of the Uganda Indoor Residual Spraying Project Phase II.

== Other considerations ==
Mpeka was a member of the London (United Kingdom)-based Malaria Consortium. She is credited with 15 scientific publications as part of her work with that scientific non-profit.

== Personal details ==
Mpeka was a mother to two sons and one daughter.
