= Ponsiano Lwakataka =

Ugandan Rally driver

- Nationality: Uganda
- Full name: Ponsiano Lwakataka
- Years active: 2000 – present
- Co-driver: Paul Musazi
- Championships: 2× Uganda National Rally Champion
- Wins: 2011 Pearl of Africa Uganda Rally,2025 EMC Jinja Rally, 2025 Southern Motor Club Challenge Rally

Awards
- 2022: Real Stars (Motorsport) Monthly Award

Ponsiano Lwakataka aka Mafu Mafu (born 11 November 1973) is a Ugandan Rally driver who is competing in the 2025 Uganda National Rally Championship (NRC).

== Early life ==
Lwakataka was born in Kanabulamu, Rakai district to late Paul Lukwago and Veronica Namuddu.

== Rally career ==
Lwakataka’s rally career began in September 2000 after a leg injury from motocross. He made his debut at the Total Pearl of Africa Independence Rally, an annual motorsport event in Uganda held to celebrate the country’s Independence Day. By 2001, he was competing in organized rallies such as the Kampala Rally. In 2002, he participated in early editions of the Mbarara Rally. Between 2003 and 2004, Lwakataka became a contender in National Rally Championship rounds. Between 2007 and 2013, he participated in the Mbarara Rally three times.

In October 2011, Lwakataka participated in the Pearl of Africa Uganda Rally, which was sponsored by KCB Bank with a sponsorship package of UGX 118 million ($50,000). On 27–28 January 2025, Lwakataka participated in and won the NRC Mbarara Rally opener. On 6 April 2025, Lwakataka participated in and won NRC Round 2 in Masaka using his Subaru Impreza N12B, nicknamed “Musota.” On 10–12 July 2025, Lwakataka participated in and won the Bugerere EMC Rally (Round 3).

== Honors and achievements ==
Lwakataka won,

- The 2005 National Rally Championship (NRC)
- The Mbarara Rally title in 2007
- The 2011 Pearl of Africa Uganda Rally
- The 2013 Mbarara Rally
- The 2022 Mbarara Rally

== See also ==
- Ronald Ssebuguzi
