= Frederick Kitaka =

Ugandan accountant and corporate executive

Frederick Mutebi Kitaka
- Born: August 1962 (age 64); Uganda
- Citizenship: Uganda
- Education: St. Mary's College Kisubi (Uganda Certificate of Education) (Uganda Advanced Certificate of Education); Makerere University (Bachelor of Science in Mathematics & Physics); University of Buckingham (Bachelor of Science in Accounting & Finance)
- Occupation: Executive Director at QCIL
- Years active: 1994–present
- Known for: Entrepreneurship, finance, real estate and pan-African investment
- Title: Co-Founder and Executive Director of Finance at QCIL
- Board member of: Quality Chemical Industries Limited (QCIL); Namulondo Investments Limited; Quality Chemicals Limited; Courtyard Estates Limited; Legacy Capital; Biashara Capital; Buganda Investments and Commercial Undertakings Limited (BICUL)
- Spouse: Doreen Nassuuna Mutebi (m. October 1996)
- Children: Phillip Nsubuga Mutebi; Vanessa Mutebi; Annalisa Mutebi
- Parents: Francis Xavier Kitaka (father); Leonie Nannyiti (mother)

Frederick Mutebi Kitaka, is a Ugandan physicist, mathematician, accountant, entrepreneur, and industrialist. He is the executive director of finance at Quality Chemical Industries Limited (QCIL), a Ugandan limited liability company. QCIL is the only Sub-Saharan pharmaceutical company that is licensed to manufacture triple therapy antiretroviral medication. He is also a shareholder in the company and sits on its board of directors.

Mutebi Kitaka has expertise in financial planning and management, economic policy, investment management, and corporate governance. His philanthropic focus on societal improvement has had multifaceted impacts on his community and beyond.

== Early life and education ==
He was born in Uganda in August 1962. He is the son of the late Fancis Xavier Kitaka (1 January 1935 - 12 September 2020), the first Ugandan to qualify as a biochemist and one of the four co-founders of Quality Chemical Industries Limited (QCIL).

Mutebi Kitaka was educated at St. Mary's College Kisubi, a distinguished boys-only Catholic high school located in Wakiso District in the Buganda Region of Uganda. He was then admitted to Makerere University, Ugaanda's largest and oldest public university, where he studied mathematics and physics, graduating with a Bachelor of Science degree. Later, he studied at the University of Buckingham in the United Kingdom, graduating with a BSc degree in Accounting and Finance.

== Work history ==
From 1994 until 1997, Mutebi Kitaka worked as the financial controller at Coopers Uganda Limited, a company that later rebranded to MTK Holdings Limited. In 1997, Mutebi Kitaka co-founded Quality Chemicals Limited, where he served as Chief Finance Officer. The company specialized in distributing human, veterinary, and agrochemical products, marking the beginning of his career in the pharmaceutical industry.

In 2005, he elevated his entrepreneurial journey by co-founding Cipla Quality Chemical Industries Limited, a pharmaceutical manufacturing plant renowned for producing high-quality WHO pre-qualified treatments for HIV/AIDS, Malaria, and Hepatitis B. Under his leadership, the company achieved a significant milestone with a successful IPO in 2018, valuing it at USD255 million.

=== Real estate and other ventures ===
Beyond pharmaceuticals, Mutebi Kitaka has made notable strides in real estate development across East Africa. He also plays a vital role in various boards, contributing to the economic development and fostering entrepreneurship in East Africa. He serves as the Board Chairman of Namulondo Investments Limited, an investment arm of the Royal Kingdom of Buganda, and holds board memberships in Legacy Capital and Biashara Capital, among others.

=== Philanthropy ===
Kitaka's philanthropic efforts are evident in his active participation in the African Leadership Initiative of the Aspen Global Leadership Network, which aims at addressing societal challenges through entrepreneurial leadership.

== See also ==
- Cipla
- Emmanuel Katongole (businessman)
- Francis Kitaka
- George Baguma
