= Uganda National Rally Championship =

Uganda National Rally Championship (NRC) is the premier motorsport rally competition in Uganda, organized annually under the authority of the Federation of Motorsport Clubs of Uganda (FMU).

NRC is the highest level of rallying in the Uganda for both Ugandan and regional drivers to showcase their talent in motorsport.

== History ==
The championship traces its origins back to the early years of organized rallying in Uganda during the 1960s and 1970s. The formal national championship structure was introduced to consolidate local rallies into a points-scoring series that would determine the national champion.

Over the years, the National Rally Competition has grown into one of East Africa’s most competitive rally series, attracting drivers from Kenya, Tanzania, Rwanda, and Burundi. It has also served as a stepping stone for Ugandan drivers to participate in continental competitions such as the African Rally Championship (ARC).

== Organization ==
The UNRC is sanctioned by the Federation of Motorsport Clubs of Uganda, which is affiliated with the Fédération Internationale de l'Automobile (FIA). The championship typically consists of multiple rally events spread throughout the year, held in different regions of Uganda. Drivers accumulate points based on their performance in each round, and the competitor with the most points at the end of the season is crowned the national champion.

=== Categories and events ===
- National Rally Championship – This features the most experienced and skilled drivers who compete in four wheel drive and all terrain vehicles held across different regions of Uganda.
- 2WD Rally Championship – This category is designed for rally cars driven by the front or rear wheels.
- Sprint Rally Championship – This category is a shorter format of rallying focusing on fast, high-intensity races, typically on closed circuits or specific rally stages with relatively shorter distances (often 3–5 kilometers per stage).

== Format ==
Each season usually comprises between 5 and 8 rally events, including notable rallies such as:

- Pearl of Africa Uganda Rally also part of the FIA African Rally Championship
- Kakungulu Rally
- Mbarara Rally
- Jinja Rally

Events are conducted on mixed gravel and tarmac surfaces, with stages varying in length and difficulty. Both driver and co-driver play critical roles in navigating Uganda's challenging terrain.

== Notable drivers ==
Several Ugandan drivers have left their mark on the championship and on African rallying in general, including:

- Charlie Lubega
- Emma Katto
- Susan Muwonge
- Ponsiano Lwakataka
- Ronald Ssebuguzi
- Jas Mangat

== See also ==
- Pearl of Africa Uganda Rally
- African Rally Championship
- Ronald Ssebuguzi
