= The Lancet Global Health =

Open-access medical journal

- Discipline: Global health
- Language: English
- Edited by: Zoë Mullan

Publication details
- History: 2013–present
- Publisher: Elsevier
- Frequency: Monthly
- Open access: Yes
- Impact factor: 22.5 (2025)

Standard abbreviations
- ISO 4: Lancet Glob. Health
- NLM: Lancet Glob Health

Indexing
- ISSN: 2214-109X

Links
- Journal homepage

The Lancet Global Health is a monthly, English-language, peer-reviewed, open-access medical journal published by Elsevier. It covers global health, with a focus on low- and middle-income countries. It was launched in 2013 as the first fully open-access journal in the Lancet family of journals.

== History and editorship ==
The journal was launched on 25 June 2013 and its first issue was dated July 2013. Zoë Mullan was its founding editor, and remains the editor-in-chief as of 2026. At its launch, the journal emphasized locally based research with regional or global relevance.

== Scope and publishing ==
The journal publishes original research, commentary, and correspondence. Its subjects include reproductive, maternal, and child health; infectious and non-communicable diseases; mental health; the health workforce; health systems; and health policy. Original research undergoes external clinical and statistical peer review. It also publishes commission reports. These include a 2018 report on the quality of health systems in the Sustainable Development Goals era, and a 2021 report on global eye health and its place in universal health coverage.

The journal has article processing charges and a fee waiver policy. Articles use Creative Commons licenses. Its publication charges have featured in debate over financial barriers facing African researchers. A 2022 study found that the journal encouraged the inclusion of authors affiliated with low- and middle-income countries in research conducted in those countries.

A 2019 analysis of its publications from 2013 to 2018 found that women made up 34.4% of distinct authors. A 2023 comparison of global health journals rated its editorial board diversity as good, based on gender, geography, and country income level.

== Abstracting and indexing ==
The journal is indexed in MEDLINE and PubMed, with coverage from its first issue, and in Scopus and the Web of Science. According to the Journal Citation Reports, the journal had a 2025 impact factor of 22.5. Bibliometric studies have identified it among leading journals in global health and health systems modeling.
