= Butabika Hospital =

Butabika National Referral Hospital
- Uganda Ministry of Health

Geography
- Location: Butabika, Kampala, Uganda
- Coordinates: 00°18′57″N 32°39′33″E

Organisation
- Care system: Public
- Type: Referral

Services
- Emergency department: I
- Beds: 900

History
- Opened: 1955

Links
- Other links: Hospitals in Uganda; Medical education in Uganda

Butabika National Referral Hospital, commonly known as Butabika Hospital is a hospital in Kampala, Uganda's capital and largest city. It is the mental health national referral hospital for the entire country's estimated population of 36 million in 2014.

== Location ==
Butabika National Referral Hospital is located in Butabika, a neighborhood within Kampala. Butabika lies in the southeastern part of the city, in Nakawa Division, adjacent to the northern shores of Lake Victoria, Africa's largest fresh-water lake. This location is approximately 10.5 kilometres (6.5 mi), by road, east of Kampala's central business district. Butabika Hospital is about 12.5 kilometres (8 mi) southeast of Mulago National Referral Hospital. The coordinates of Butabika Hospital are: 0°18'57.0"N, 32°39'33.0"E (latitude: 0.315845 and longitude: 32.659160).

== Overview ==
Butabika Hospital is a public psychiatric hospital, funded and administered by the Uganda Ministry of Health and general care in the hospital is free. The hospital is the only referral psychiatric hospital in Uganda. Opened in 1955, it has a bed capacity of 900, as of February 2010. The hospital also serves as the psychiatric teaching hospital for Makerere University College of Health Sciences for both undergraduate and postgraduate training, especially for the degrees of Bachelor of Medicine and Bachelor of Surgery (MBChB), Master of Medicine in Psychiatry (MMed Psych) and Doctor of Philosophy (PhD) in psychiatry.

Butabika Hospital is also the location of the Institute of Psychiatric Clinical Officers, a school administered by the Uganda Ministry of Health, which trains high school graduates to become psychiatric clinical officers. It is the only school of its kind in Eastern Africa.

Whilst working at the hospital n the early 2000s, Etheldreda Nakimuli-Mpungu noticed a large number of HIV/AIDS patients were being admitted with serious mental health problems. This inspired her to begin a research programme which has since proven that culturally appropriate, group psychotherapy, which is led by non-professional practitioners is an effective treatment of depression in HIV patients, which has positive impacts on their physical health.

== See also ==
- List of hospitals in Uganda
- List of medical schools in Uganda
- Ministry of Health (Uganda)
