= Eneriko Seruma =

- Born: Henry S. Kimbugwe; 1944 (age 81–82); Uganda
- Education: St. Mary's College Kisubi
- Occupation: Writer
- Writing career
- Genres: Poetry, novels, short stories
- Notable works: The Experience; The Heart Seller

Eneriko Seruma is the pen name for Ugandan poet, novelist and short story writer Henry S. Kimbugwe (born 1944). He is the author of the novel The Experience and a collection of short stories titled The Heart Seller. He also wrote poems and short stories for leading East African journals and magazines in the 1960s and 1970s, including for Ghala, Busara, Zuka and Transition.'

== Early life and education ==
Seruma was born in Uganda and educated in the United States. He attended St. Mary's College Kisubi for his secondary education. He attended, and graduated from, Marlboro College in Marlboro, Vermont. He was the public relations officer for the East African Publishing House and was an award winner of the East Africa Literature Bureau's and Deutsche Welle's creative writing competitions.

== Published works ==
=== Novels ===
- The Experience. East African Publishing House. 1970.

=== Short story collections ===
- The Heart Seller: Short stories (Modern African library, 21). East African Publishing House. 1971.

=== Anthologies ===
- "The Town", in Ayebia Clarke, ed. (2004). Half a Day anOther Stories: an anthology of short stories from north eastern and eastern Africa. Macmillan Kenya. ISBN 9789966340856.
