= University of Newcastle School of Medicine and Public Health =

Medical school in University of Newcastle, Australia

University of Newcastle School of Medicine
- Type: Public
- Established: 1978
- Dean: Professor Brian Kelly
- Students: 500 approx.
- Location: Newcastle, New South Wales, Australia
- Campus: Urban
- Colours: Blood Red, Bone White
- Website: www.newcastle.edu.au/jmp/

The University of Newcastle School of Medicine, located at the University of Newcastle, is one of eight medical schools in Australia that offers an undergraduate medical degree. The first cohort of medical students began in 1978 and the school has educated more Indigenous medical students than any other University in Australia. Led by foundational Dean and psychiatrist David Maddison, the new school led a major change in medical education in Australia in the late 1970s by introducing Problem-based learning, early clinical skills acquisition, community orientation, and the addition of personal qualities evaluation to the student selection process. A focus on rural medical experience has been in place for many years, and the school now offers its medical program as a partnership with the University of New England, Hunter New England Health and Northern Sydney Central Coast Health. Known as the Joint Medical Program (JMP) it is the first jointly run medical program in Australia.

== History ==
The University of Newcastle's Medical School was established in 1975 as the Faculty of Medicine. Under the steerage of Professor David Maddison (Founding Dean), it very quickly gained an international reputation for excellence and innovation in teaching and learning. Its problem-based curricula coupled with early clinical experience starting in the first year of the degree program, offered students a different approach to the study of medicine compared to other Universities that delay clinical experience.

Approximately 76 academic, 88 general and about 600 conjoint academic staff conduct research, teach into or support the medical and health education programs across 45 disciplines of Medicine within the School.

Student numbers for the medical program have more than tripled since the first intake in 1978 of 63 to the current cohort of almost 190 students in the Joint Medical Program located across the Callaghan and Armidale campuses. Program delivery has been developed and updated over the past 30 years, but the basics still remain and the school continues to provide early clinical experience to support its problem based learning curricula.

The curriculum for the new Joint Medical program, based on the established University of Newcastle program, is identical at both institutions. The special features of the JMP include its focus on medical workforce for rural, remote and regional Australia and the opportunity provided by the geographic coherence between the two Universities and their two major health partners, Hunter New England Health and Northern Sydney Central Coast Health.

== Teaching affiliates ==
- Armidale Regional Hospital - Armidale
- Cessnock District Hospital - Cessnock
- Glen Innes District Hospital - Glen Innes
- Gloucester Soldiers' Memorial Hospital - Gloucester
- Gunnedah District Hospital - Gunnedah
- Inverell District Hospital - Inverell
- John Hunter Hospital - Newcastle
- Maitland Hospital - Maitland
- Manning Base Hospital - Taree
- Moree District Hospital - Moree
- Muswellbrook District Hospital - Muswellbrook
- Nelson Bay and District Polyclinic - Nelson Bay
- Newcastle Mater Misericordiae Hospital - Newcastle
- Prince Albert Memorial Hospital - Tenterfield
- Scott Memorial Hospital - Scone
- Singleton District Hospital - Singleton
- Tamworth Base Hospital - Tamworth

== Course outline ==
The Bachelor of Medical Science and Doctor of Medicine – MD-JMP is characterised by an integrated problem-based curriculum with early clinical exposure and substantial community involvement. Emphasis is placed on understanding clinical, diagnostic and therapeutic approaches, learned in the context of the relevant basic science concepts and mechanisms. The integrated program requires students to make connections between the different areas in medicine and the basic sciences in order to apply them to specific medical problems. The curriculum differs from traditional programs in its integration of basic and clinical sciences and its early orientation towards clinical practice in medicine. The curriculum centres on problem-based, self-directed learning where students work in small tutorial groups to analyse clinical problems, and to gain an understanding of relevant scientific data. Students in the first few years learn in small groups of around 8 students, groups which are balanced in regards to age, gender and experience.

=== Year One ===
In these courses/units students are introduced to the major causes and effects of disease that occur during different stages of the life cycle of humans. A free elective is given in Semester 1 and the students may choose a course that interests them from any other faculty as long as it fits in with the Medical timetable. In Semester 2 musculoskeletal, gastrointestinal and renal systems are examined and a systematic progression through the body systems is commenced.

=== Year Two ===
These courses/units students cover problems associated with the reproductive and musculoskeletal systems, haematology, neurology, psychiatry and endocrinology. Problem Based Learning remains the same as first year and there are three session of PBL every week, each running for two hours. There is a clinical skills class every fortnight for three hours, where students learn physical OSCEs and practice patient consultation. The biggest difference between first year and second year is the introduction of two days of GP placements, where students shadow a general practitioner for six hours each day.

=== Year Three ===
In these courses/units students study a problem based learning curriculum which is interwoven with clinical placements in rural and urban general practice as well as in selected subspecialties. In the second half of semester 2, students undertake a Health Equity Scheme – an 8-week placement in an area of disadvantage in regards to Health. This scheme may be done anywhere in the world.

=== Year Four ===
Students enrol in four courses/units: Medicine, Surgery, Reproductive Medicine and Paediatrics. These are clinical attachments with additional tutorials and teaching scheduled.

=== Year Five ===
Students enrol in four courses/units: Medicine, Psychiatry/Primary Health Care Selective, Anaesthesia/Intensive Care, Oncology/ Palliative Care and Surgery/Emergency Medicine.

== Deans ==
- David Maddison
- Geoffrey M Kellerman
- John Hamilton
- Rob Sanson-Fisher
- Michael Hensley

== University of Newcastle Medical Society ==
The University of Newcastle Medical Society (UNMS) is a representative organisation for medical students at the university of Newcastle. The Society (affectionately known as ‘medsoc’ on campus) represents over 650 medical students. Since starting in 1978 the UNMS has organised a broad range of services for its members, including: representation, academic events, charity initiatives, welfare support, social events and sporting events.
