= John Nasasira =

Ugandan politician

- Born: 5 January 1952 (age 74); Uganda
- Education: University of Nairobi (BSc. in Civil Engineering)
- Occupations: Engineer, politician
- Years active: 1989 — present
- Known for: Politics
- Title: Minister of Information and Communication Technology

John Nwoono Nasasira is a Ugandan engineer and politician. He was most recently the Minister of Information and Communication Technology in the Cabinet of Uganda, but resigned as an MP in August 2016, citing "ill health." He was appointed to that position on 23 May 2013, replacing Ruhakana Rugunda. Before that, from 27 May 2011 until 23 May 2013, he served as the Chief Government Whip. Earlier, from 1996 until 2011, he served as the Minister of Works and Transportation. He also represents Kazo County, Kiruhura District in the Parliament, a position he has occupied continuously since 1989.

== Background and education ==
He was born in Kiruhura District on 1 May 1952. Nasasira holds a Bachelor of Science in civil engineering degree from the University of Nairobi.

== Career ==
Nasasira has continuously represented Kazo County, Kiruhura District, in the Ugandan Parliament since 1989. Between 1989 and 1991, he served as Minister of State for Works. From 1991 until 1992, he served as an Adviser to the President of Uganda on Public Relations. In 1992, he was appointed Minister of State for Works, Transportation and Communications, serving in that capacity until 1994.

From 1994 until 1995, Nasasira was one of the delegates to the Constituent Assembly that drew up the 1995 Uganda Constitution. He also served as Minister of State for Agriculture during the same period. In 1995, he was appointed Minister of Agriculture, Animal Industry and Fisheries. In 1996, he was instead appointed Minister of Works, Housing and Communications. For ten years, he served in that capacity, making him one of the longest-lasting cabinet appointments in the National Resistance Movement government. Between May 2011 and May 2013, he served as the government chief whip in the Parliament of Uganda. On 23 May 2013, he was appointed Minister of Information and Communication Technology.

== Personal details ==
Nasasira is married. He is reported to enjoy farming, reading, sports, and politics.
