= Ronald Ssebuguzi =

- Nationality: Uganda
- Full name: Ronald Ssebuguzi
- Years active: 2001–present
- Car number: 2
- Co-driver: Anthony Mugamba
- Championships: 3× Uganda National Rally Champion
- Wins: 2022 Central Motor Club (CMC) Rally

Awards
- 2015: USPA Best Sports Personality

Ronald Ssebuguzi is a Ugandan Rally driver who is competing in the Uganda National Rally Championship (NRC).

== Rally career ==
Ssebuguzi started his rally journey in 2001 after being inspired by Charlie Lubega, where he finished second in the National Rally Championship (NRC). In 2004, he acquired Charlie Evo 4 which he used to win the 2006 National Rally Championships. In 2013, Ssebuguzi, sponsored by Jomayi Property, participated in the Freedom City Challenge Rally, where he secured first place.

In 2014, Ssebuguzi participated in the Masaka Protection Unit (MPU) Masaka Rally, the third round of the National Rally Championship (NRC). In 2021, Ssebuguzi participated in the World Championship Safari Rally, with sponsorship support worth UGX 25 million from Shell V-Power. Ssebuguzi competed in the November 2022 Central Motor Club-CMC rally champions that was held in Iganga, Bugweri, and Jinja districts. In 2023, he participated in the Mbarara Rally and finished second. In the 2025 Bugerere Stabex East African Motor Championship (EMC) Rally, held from July 10–12 across Jinja, Kayunga, and Iganga districts, Ssebuguzi competed and finished third.

== Honors and achievements ==
Ssebuguzi won,

The 2006 National Rally Championship

The 2009 National Rally Championship

The 2014 National Rally Championship

The Uganda Sports Press Association (USPA) Sports Personality of the Month for October 2015

The Winner of the 2022 Central Motor Club (CMC) Rally

The Fortebet Real Stars Sports Award (July Motorsport)

== See also ==
- Uganda National Rally Championship
- Safari Rally
- Shell V-Power
- Anthony Mugambwa
