= Luzira =

Suburb of Kampala, Uganda

- Location in Kampala
- Coordinates: 00°18′06″N 32°38′42″E
- Country: Uganda
- Region: Central Uganda
- District: Kampala Capital City Authority
- Division: Nakawa Division
- Elevation: 3,740 ft (1,140 m)

Luzira is a town in Kampala the capital city of Uganda. It is best known for the country's main prison and inbuilt health center accessible by public, Luzira Maximum Security Prison, which has seen significant redevelopment thanks to the work of the government of Uganda and African Prisons Project, a charity based in the UK and Kampala.

== Location ==
Luzira lies in Nakawa Division, one of the five administrative divisions of Kampala. It is located approximately 10 kilometres (6.2 mi), by road, southeast of the central business district of Kampala. It is bordered by Butabika to the north, Mutungo and Kitintale to the northwest, Mpanga to the west, Port Bell to the south and an inlet of Lake Victoria to the east. The coordinates of Luzira are:0°18'06.0"N, 32°38'42.0"E (Latitude:0.301667; Longitude:32.644999).

== Overview ==
Luzira is the name that the indigenous Baganda use to refer to the general neighborhood. Port Bell is the area where the landing pier is situated, at the tip of the peninsular into Lake Victoria, in the most southern part of the general Luzira neighborhood. Mpanga is the location of Uganda's maximum security prison, located in the western part of the general Luzira neighborhood. The central part of Luzira is mainly an industrial park, where most of the factories are located. The eastern part of Luzira township is mainly a middle-class residential neighborhood. Prehistoric artifacts dating back to around 1000 AD, have been uncovered at the site where the maximum security prison is located. This includes the famous Luzira Head, which is currently housed in the British Museum.

== Luzira Maximum Security Prison ==
The prison, the largest penal institution in Uganda was designed with capacity of 1,700 inmates, but often houses close to 8,000. On 27 August 2014, the day of the 2014 national population census, the prison housed 6,336 people; 3, 373 were in the Luzira Upper Prison, 1,495 were in Murchison Bay Prison, and Kampala Remand Prison had 1, 040 inmates. The Luzira Women's Prison had 400 inmates and 28 children.

== Points of interest ==
The following points of interest are found inside or near Luzira:

- Luzira Maximum Security Prison, designed to house 1,700 but with population above 7,700 in April 2016, including the country's only death row.
- Uganda Breweries Limited, a division of East African Breweries.
- Quality Chemical Industries Limited, an antiretroviral drug factory.
- Port Bell, which is located on the shores of Lake Nalubaale, handles both passenger and cargo traffic destined for Kisumu, Kenya, Mwanza and Musoma in Tanzania.
- Butabika National Referral Hospital, Uganda's national psychiatric referral hospital with a bed capacity of 900. Located in the adjacent community called Butabika.

== See also ==
- Uganda Railways
- Uganda National Roads Authority
