= Port Bell =

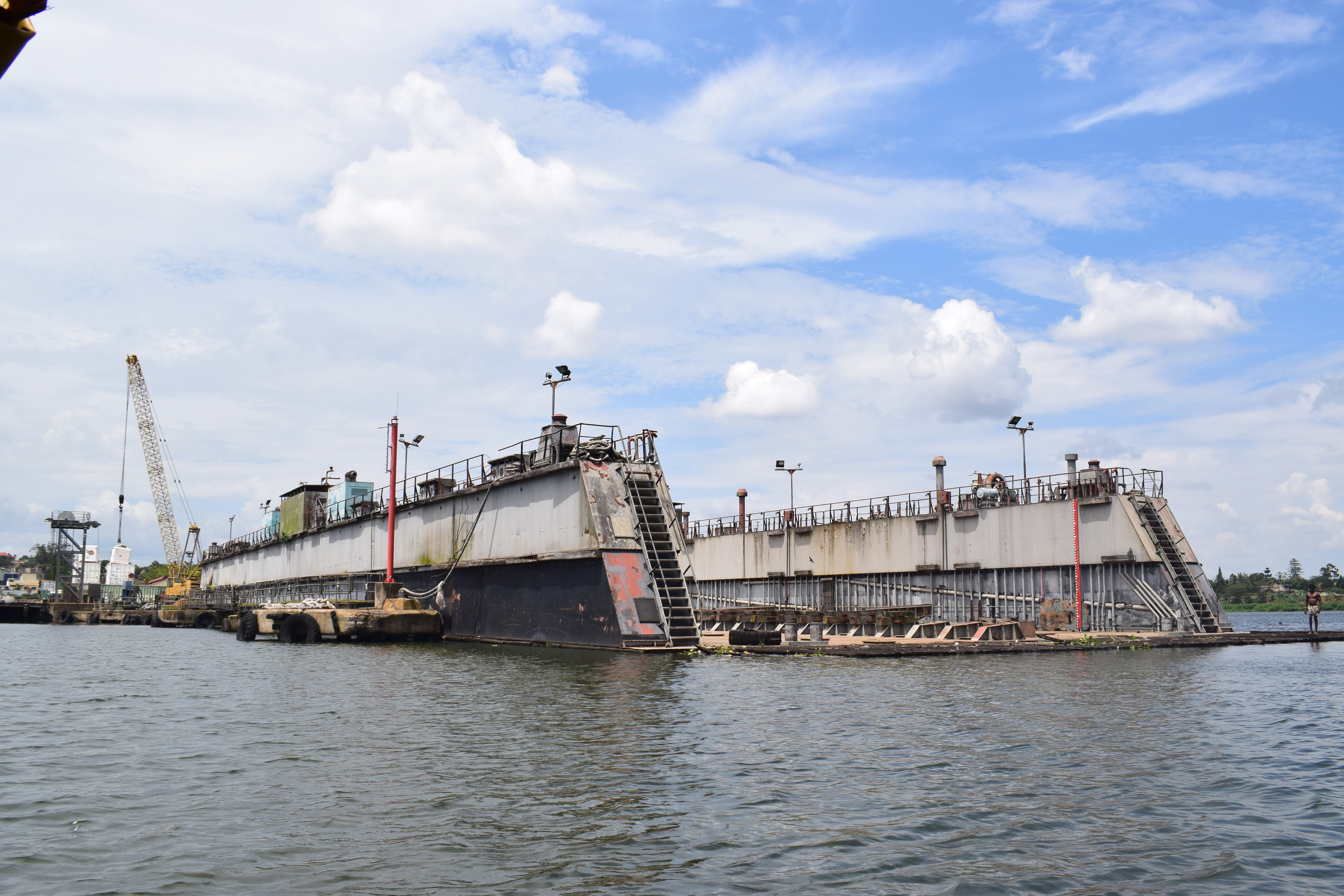
- Port Bell Pier

- Location in Uganda
- Coordinates: 00°17′20″N 32°39′13″E
- Country: Uganda
- Region: Central Uganda
- District: Kampala Capital City Authority
- Division: Nakawa Division
- Elevation: 3,710 ft (1,130 m)

Port Bell is a small industrial centre in the greater metropolitan Kampala area, in Uganda. Port Bell has a rail link and a railroad ferry wharf used for International traffic across Lake Victoria to Tanzania and Kenya.

== Location ==
Port Bell is located in Nakawa Division, one of the five administrative divisions of the city of Kampala. It is a subdivision of the greater Luzira area in the south-eastern part of the city. It is located at the end of a narrow inlet of Lake Victoria, approximately 11 kilometres (7 mi), by road, south-east of the central business district of Kampala, Uganda's capital and largest city. The coordinates of Port Bell are 0°17'20.0"N, 32°39'13.0"E (Latitude:0.288900; Longitude:32.653620).

== Overview ==
The port is named after Henry Hesketh Bell, a British commissioner, who took over administration of Britain's interests in Uganda in 1906. Its rail link is a branch line from the Kampala-Jinja main line.

Lake Victoria ferries operate from Port Bell linking Kampala to other railhead ports on Lake Victoria including Jinja, Kisumu, Musoma, and Mwanza.

When the first stage of the Uganda Railway was completed in 1901, the railhead was at Kisumu, 12 hours journey from Port Bell by ship. Ferries brought goods by lake between Port Bell and Kisumu. It was not until 1931 that the main line of the railway from Nakuru reached Kampala and then Port Bell.

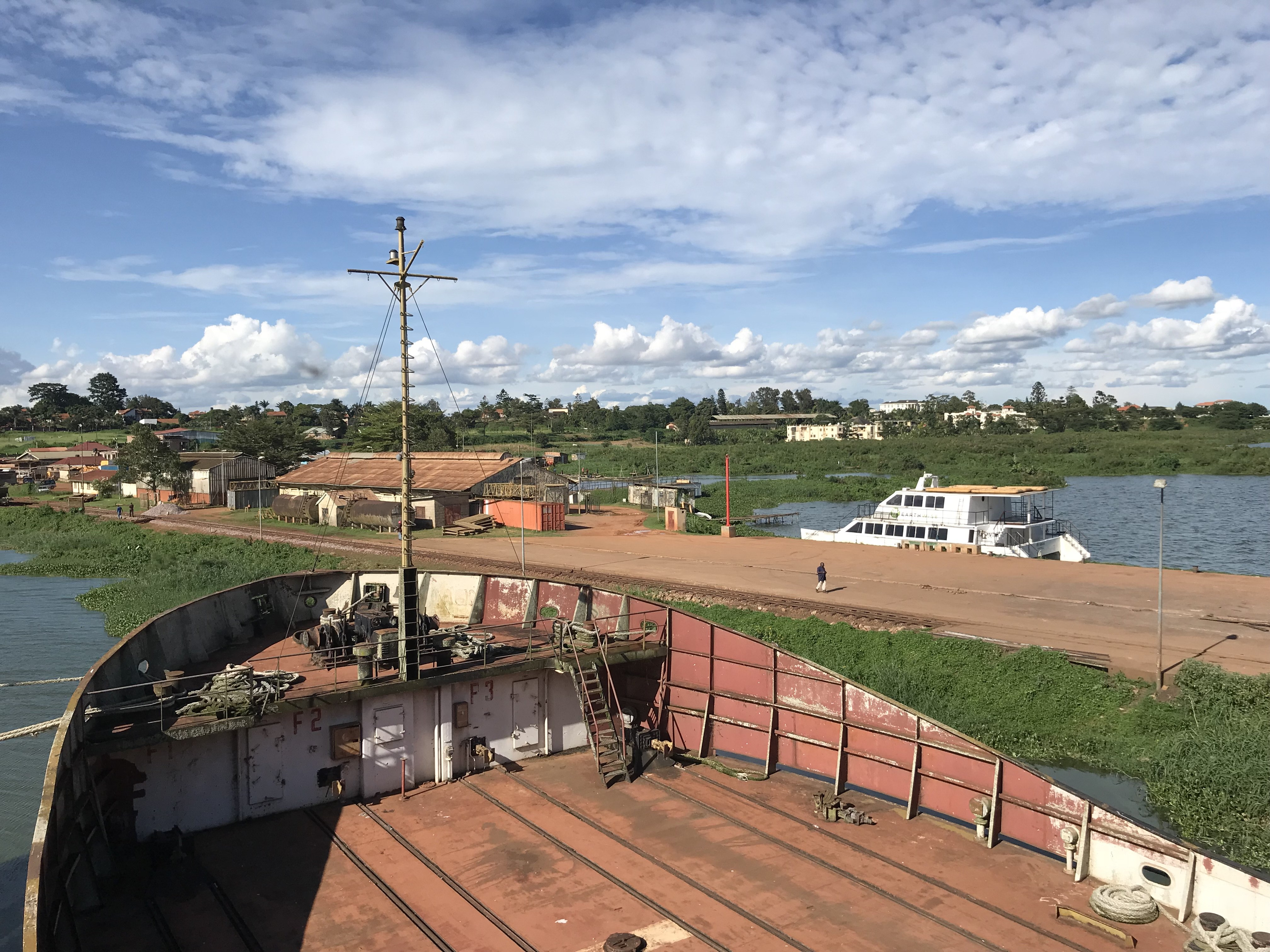
Portbell Luzira

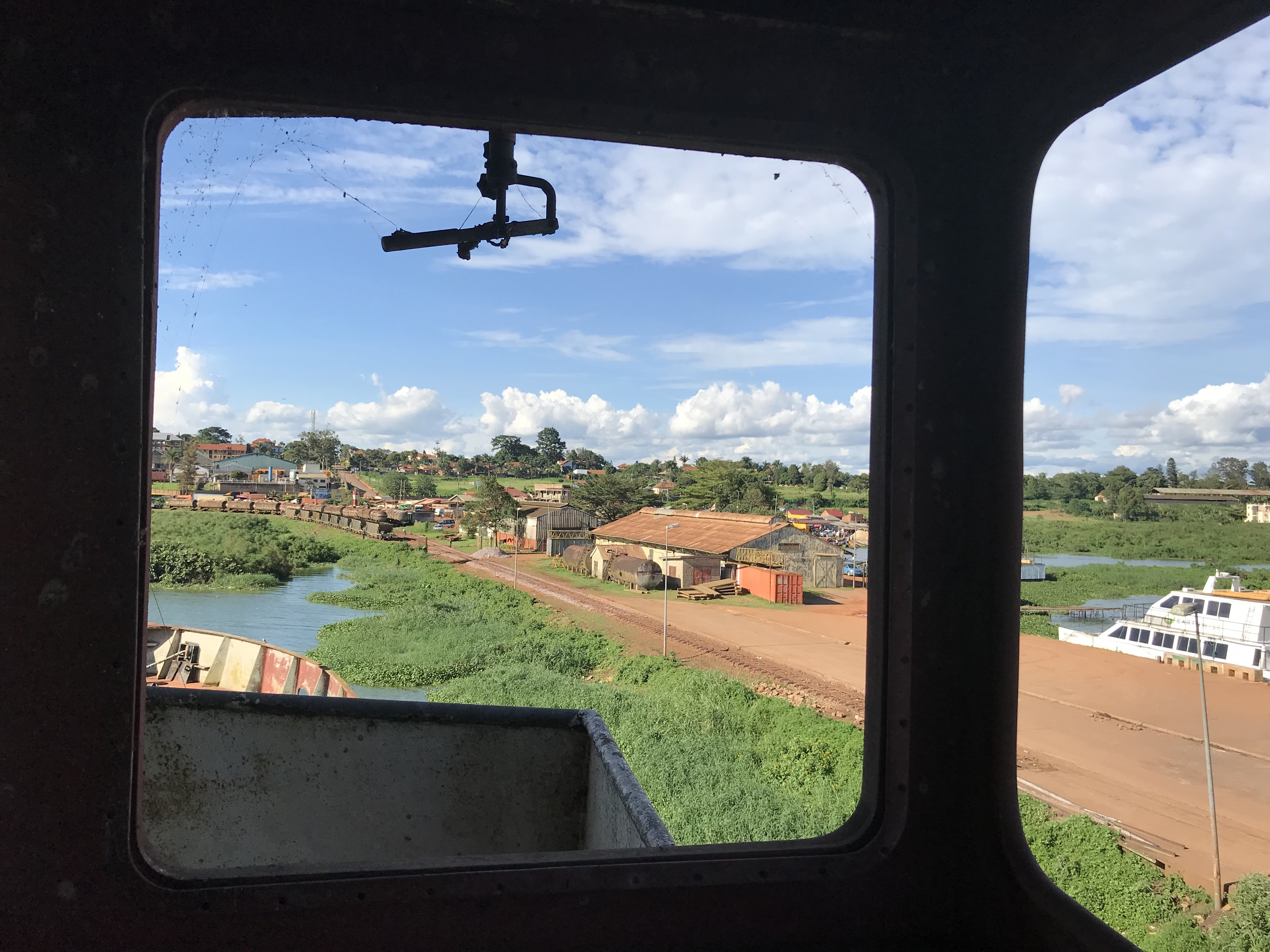
Portbell Luzira Uganda

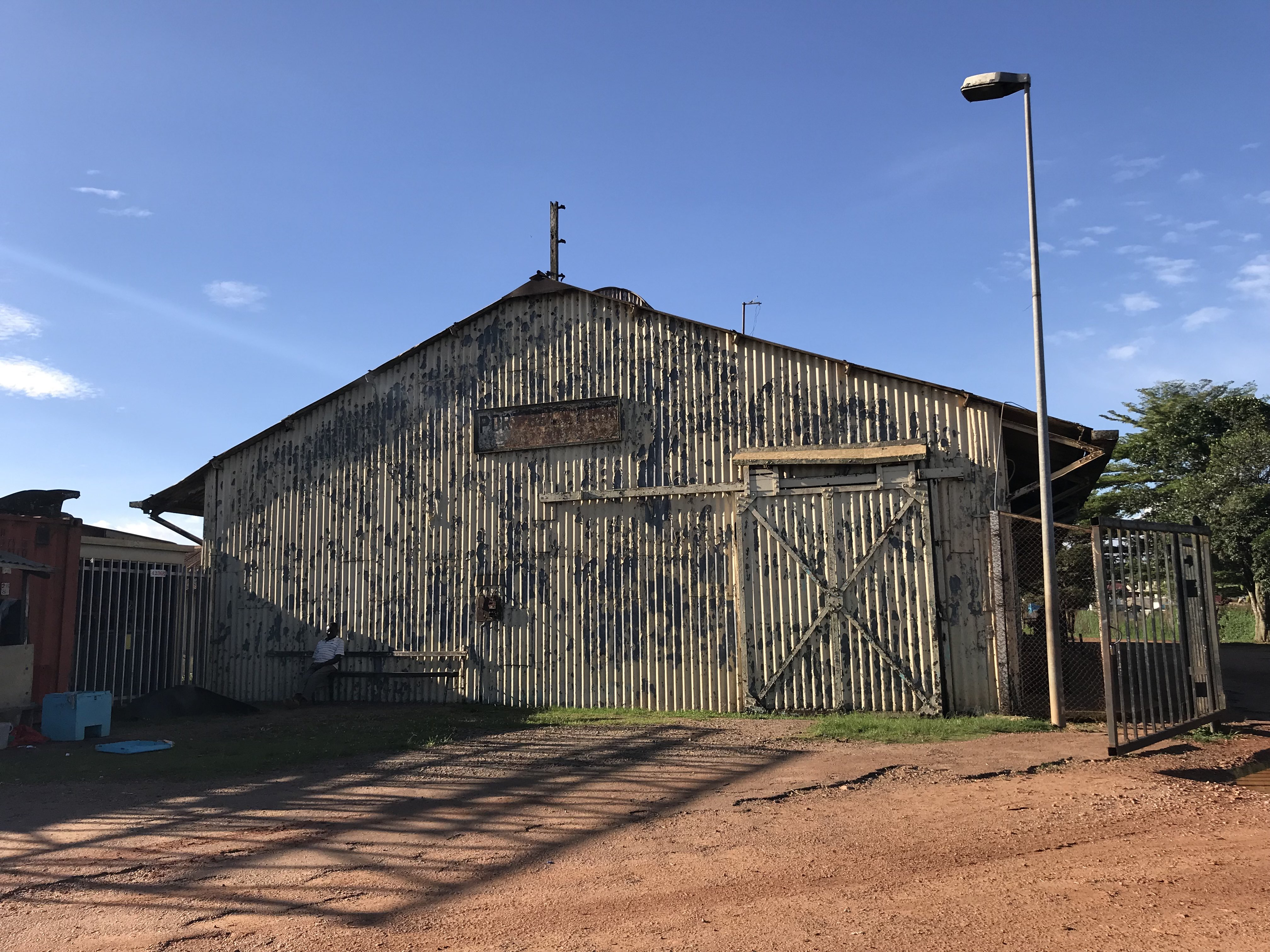
warehouse at portbell

== Industry ==
Uganda Breweries Limited, a subsidiary of East African Breweries, has a brewery and a distillery for Uganda Waragi at Port Bell.

== Points of interest ==
The points of interest in or near Port Bell include:

- Luzira Maximum Security Prison — Has a capacity of 20,000 inmates, including about 500 on death row.
- Cipla Quality Chemical Industries Limited — this US$40 million factory is the only one in sub-Saharan Africa that manufactures triple antiretroviral drug therapy medication.
- Uganda Breweries Limited — division of East African Breweries and maker of Uganda Waragi, a triple-distilled gin and Bell beer
- Port Bell — a port on the shores of Lake Nalubaale, handlin passenger and cargo traffic destined for Kisumu, Kenya and Mwanza and Musoma in Tanzania. The port is undergoing a two-year upgrade and renovation.

== Air travel ==
Between 1930 and 1950 Port Bell was a landing point on the Imperial Airways flying boat passenger and mail route from Southampton to Johannesburg's Vaal Dam. Port Bell linked Khartoum and Kisumu. The nearby Silver Springs Hotel was originally built by the British Overseas Airways Corporation as a rest stop for passengers between long flights. During World War II, Port Bell was also on the route connecting Cairo with Libreville.

== See also ==
- Railway stations in Uganda
- Transport in Uganda
- Rift Valley Railways
