= Quality Chemical Industries Limited =

Pharmaceutical manufacturing company in Uganda

Coordinates: 00°18′17″N 32°38′22″E

- Formerly: Cipla Quality Chemical Industries Limited - CiplaQCIL
- Type: Public; USE: QCIL
- Industry: Pharmaceutical Industry
- Founded: July 10, 2005; 21 years ago
- Headquarters: Luzira, Kampala, Uganda
- Area served: Africa
- Key people: Emmanuel Katongole; Executive Chairman; Ajay Kumar Pal; Chief Executive Officer
- Products: Pharmaceuticals
- Revenue: ▲:USh265.3 billion (US$70.9 million) (March 2024)
- Total assets: USh232.0 billion (US$60.1 million) (March 2024)
- Number of employees: 580+ (2025)
- Website: www.qcil.com

Quality Chemical Industries Limited (QCIL), formerly Cipla Quality Chemical Industries Limited (CiplaQCIL) is a pharmaceutical manufacturing company, established in Uganda in 2005. The company is the largest producer of World Health Organization (WHO) pre-qualified HIV/AIDS and malaria treatments in the region. According to a 2007 published report, QCIL was the only company in Africa to manufacture triple-combination antiretroviral (ARV) drugs. QCIL currently produces TLD (a combination of tenofovir, lamivudine and dolutegravir), the latest first-line treatment used to treat and prevent HIV/AIDS. QCIL also manufactures antimalarials (ACTs), including Lumartem, containing artemisinin and lumefantrine, and the Hepatitis B generic medicines Texavir and Zentair.

The company also manufactures antibacterials, anti-hypertensives, vasodilators, anti-emetics, antibiotics and antidiabetics.

== Location ==
QCIL's pharmaceutical manufacturing plant is located in Luzira, an industrial area in Nakawa Division in south-eastern Kampala. The plant is approximately 9 kilometres (6 mi), by road, south-east of Kampala's central business district. The coordinates of the plant are 0°18'17.0"N, 32°38'22.0"E (Latitude:0.304723; Longitude:32.639436).

== Overview ==
As of 31 March 2024, the company's total assets were valued at USh232.0 billion (US$60.1 million), with associated EBITDA USh188.199 billion USh53.7 billion (US$14.4 million).

== History ==
In 2005, Quality Chemical Industries Limited was incorporated as a joint venture between, inter alia, Messrs. Emmanuel Katongole, Frederick Mutebi Kitaka and George Baguma (the Sponsors) and Cipla Limited (Cipla). The factory was commissioned in 2007.

In 2010, the company became the first WHO-prequalified facility in the region. Relevant products, such as ARVs and ACTs were also WHO-prequalified. In the same year, the company became the first in Africa to supply Global Fund with ACTs.

In 2014, Cipla acquired control of the company, and the company changed its name to Cipla Quality Chemical Industries Limited (CiplaQCIL).

In 2016, the company was converted to a public company. Two years later, in 2018, the company listed on the Uganda Securities Exchange, offering shares to individual and institutional investors in an Initial Public Offering (IPO).

In 2019, the company commissioned a new warehouse with a 5,000-pallet capacity. This was followed by the commissioning of a new laboratory in 2020.

In November 2023, Africa Capitalworks (ACW) acquired Cipla's 51.18% interest in the issued ordinary shares of the company. On 15 February 2024, the company changed its name to Quality Chemical Industries Limited (QCIL).

As of March 2024, with a production capacity of approximately 1.2 billion pills per year, QCIL was trading with 13 African countries and had regulatory approval in 31 African countries.

QCIL announced record earnings and dividends in 2024.

As of 31 March 2024, the shareholding in the business was as follows:

Quality Chemical Industries Limited (QCIL) Shareholding
Shareholder	Domicile	Ownership (%)	Notes
Africa Capitalworks SSA 3	Mauritius	51.18	
Amistad Limited	United Kingdom	11.51	
Capitalworks SSA 1	Mauritius	11.15	
Government Employees Pension Fund	Uganda	8.54	
NSSF Uganda	Uganda	7.38	
Emmanuel Katongole	Uganda	2.79	
Fredrick Mutebi Kitaka	Uganda	2.79	
George William Baguma	Uganda	2.79	
Joseph Yiga	Uganda	0.11	
Others		1.76	
Total		100.00	

== Governance ==
Emmanuel Katongole is the Chairman of QCIL. He succeeded the late Francis Kitaka (1925 - 2021), one of the founding members and the first biochemist trained in East Africa. Katongole was previously the Managing Director of CiplaQCIL. The Chief Executive Officer of QCIL is Ajay Kumar Pal.

== Developments ==
As of October 2024, as reported by the Daily Monitor, QCIL was contemplating building a new US$50 million production line to manufacture anti-TB and anti-cancer medication. Potential willing funders include Standard Chartered Bank, USAID and the government of Italy.

== See also ==
- Kampala Capital City Authority
