= National Drug Authority =

Licensing and regulatory agency in Uganda

Coordinates: 00°19′36″N 32°34′32″E

National Drug Authority (NDA)
- Type: Parastatal
- Industry: Drug regulation and supervision
- Founded: 1993; 33 years ago
- Headquarters: NDA tower, Buganda road. Kampala, Uganda
- Key people: Medard Bitekyerezo (chairman); David Nahamya (Secretary to the Authority)
- Products: Pharmaceutical licenses and drug regulation
- Website: Homepage

The National Drug Authority (NDA) is a government-owned organisation in Uganda, mandated to regulate drugs in the country, including their manufacture, importation, distribution, and licensing.

== Overview ==
NDA was created by the Ugandan legislature in 1993. It began operations in 1994 as the National Drug Authority (NDA). At that time, the mission of the NDA was to regulate the manufacture, importation, and use of human and veterinary drugs in the country. In 2014, the Ugandan Cabinet approved plans to expand the NDA into the NFDA by adding food, food additives, food supplements, cosmetics, and commercial animal feeds to the items under the organization's supervision. The relevant laws transforming NDA into NFDA are before the Ugandan Parliament for promulgation.

== Location ==
The headquarters of the NDA is located at 46-48 Lumumba Avenue, in Kampala Central Division, on Nakasero Hill, in the central business district of Kampala, the capital and largest city of Uganda. The coordinates of the head office are 0°19'36.0"N, 32°34'32.0"E (Latitude:0.326667; Longitude:32.575556).

NDA maintains regional offices at the following locations:

1. Nakawa - Central Uganda
2. Mbarara - Southwestern Uganda
3. Jinja - Southeastern Uganda
4. Tororo - Eastern Uganda
5. Hoima - Western Uganda
6. Lira - Northern Uganda
7. Arua - West Nile

The agency works in collaboration with the Uganda Ministry of Health and the Uganda Ministry of Agriculture, Animal Industry and Fisheries.

== History ==
As far back as 2010, elements of the Ugandan government recognized the need to regulate food manufacture, importation, labeling, distribution, and marketing to reduce food and water-borne diseases in the country as well as to ensure food safety. Efforts to assign the regulatory function to the then existing NDA began then.

However, the regulation of food manufacture still remains a core function of the Uganda National Bureau of Standards (UNBS).

== Governance ==
The agency is governed by a 17-person member board, which serves for a four-year renewable term. Its members include the following individuals, effective January 2017:

- Medard Bitekyerezo: chairman
- Brigadier Ambrose Musinguzi
- Raymond Agaba
- Muhammad Mbabali
- Yahaya Hills Sekagya
- Fadhiru Kamba Pakoyo
- Hanifa Sengendo Namaala
- Sembatya Kimbowa
- Bildard Baguma
- Grace Nambatya Kyeyune
- Sylvia Angubua Baluka
- Rose Okurut Ademun
- Baterana Byarugaba
- Moses Kamabare
- Daniel Obua
- Morris Seru
- Grace Akullo

== See also ==
- Economy of Uganda
