= Ali Kiiza =

Ugandan general

Major General Ali Kiiza
- Born: 1944 (age 81–82); Masindi District, Uganda
- Occupations: Military officer, Pilot
- Years active: 1973–2012
- Title: Senior Military Adviser to the President of Uganda

Ali Muhammed Kiiza (born 1944) is a retired Ugandan Major General, in the UPDF Air Force, who serves as a Senior Military Adviser to the President of Uganda. Prior to that, he served as the Chief Pilot to six Heads of State in the Government of Uganda, from 1973 until 2012.

== Background and education ==
Kiiza was born in Masindi District, in the Western Region of Uganda, on 27 October 1944. After attending primary school, he was admitted to Masindi Secondary School (currently Kabalega Secondary School), where he completed his O-Level studies in 1965. That same year, he signed up at school, to join the Uganda Air Force.

After recruitment, he attended basic training at Jinja, for about four months in 1966, before he transferred to Entebbe, to start flight school, in 1967. He first trained using a Piper PA-18 Super Cub, before graduating to a Fouga CM.170 Magister. In 1968, Kiiza was commissioned as a Second Lieutenant.

== Career ==
He was then assigned to the VIP Transport Division, within the Uganda Army Air Force, using a Piper PA-23 aircraft. That is how he met Idi Amin, when the latter served as the Army Commander. Ali became Amin's personal pilot.

In 1972, Ali saw combat during the Uganda–Tanzania border skirmish, when the Fouga Magister he was piloting was fired at by Ugandan exiles in Northern Tanzania. The bullet went through the co-pilot's seat, which was unoccupied at that time. He was awarded a Military Cross medal for his heroics.

Also in 1972, Uganda acquired a Gulfstream II, for presidential travel. Kiiza, with three others were sent to FlightSafety Savannah Learning Center, in Savannah, Georgia, United States, to learn how to fly the Gulfstream. The other three were Andrew Mukooza, Paul Babula and Patrick Bogere. They continued their training at Vero Beach, Florida, where they acquired their commercial pilots licenses.

Following training in the United States, Kiiza started to fly as co-pilot on the Gulfstream in 1974, with American pilots in control. In 1975, he flew the aircraft to Iraq, as captain for the first time. 1975 was a busy year for Kiiza. He undertook combat flight training in Iraq, under Russian instruction on Mikoyan-Gurevich MiG-21 (MiG-21) fighter jets. He was then appointed the commander of the Uganda Army Air Force's MiG-21 unit, known as the "Supersonic Fighter Squadron".

That same year, Uganda hosted the OAU Heads of State Summit, in Kampala. He piloted Yasser Arafat from Damascus, Syria to Entebbe, and then to Khartoum, Sudan. Also, General Yakubu Gowon, at that time the president of Nigeria, was overthrown while he was in Kampala, attending the OAU Summit. Amin tasked Kiiza to fly Gowon to Lomé, Togo, where he went into exile. By 1978, Kiiza had risen to lieutenant colonel.

In spite of the multiple changes in leadership in Uganda during the 1970s and 1980s, Kiiza continued to function as the presidential chief pilot, because of his training and experience. He flew Yusuf Lule, Godfrey Binaisa, Paulo Muwanga, and Milton Obote.

== Out of Uganda and into exile ==
In June 1981, Kiiza felt unsafe in Uganda. He told Obote that the presidential jet needed servicing in the United States. He flew the plane to the US, then turned around and flew it back to London, in the United Kingdom. Kiiza handed the presidential jet to Lieutenant Colonel Paul Babula (RIP), who flew the Gulfstream II back to Uganda. Kiiza settled in the United States, where Gulfstream Aerospace offered him employment. He returned to Uganda in 1986, after Yoweri Museveni had become president.

== After 1986 ==
In 1987, Kiiza was recalled back into the Air Force. He served as Museveni's chief pilot from 1987 until 2012. During this period, Kiiza recalls flying president Nelson Mandela, when he visited Uganda in 1994. He flew him from Entebbe to Addis Ababa, Ethiopia, then to Pretoria, South Africa. Other notable passengers include president Paul Kagame of Rwanda.

In July 2018, Ali Muhammed Kiiza was retired from the UPDF at the rank of Major General. However, he continues to serve as a senior presidential adviser on Air Force matters, a role he was first appointed to in 1998.

== See also ==
- Kwatsi Alibaruho
- Michael Etiang
- Gad Gasatura
- Kokoro Janda
- Robert Kateera
- Vanita Kayiwa
- Naomi Karungi
- Kenneth Kiyemba
- Brian Mushana Kwesiga
- Rebecca Mpagi
- Peter Thomas (pilot)
- Robert Wakhweya
