= Naomi Karungi =

Ugandan military helicopter pilot (1978-2020

- Born: 1 December 1978; Ntungamo District, Uganda
- Died: 28 January 2020 (aged 41); Bulo, Uganda
- Education: East African Civil Aviation Academy (Commercial Pilot Licence)
- Alma mater: Makerere University (Bachelor of Arts in Economics and Social Work)
- Years active: 2003–2020
- Military career
- Allegiance: Ugandan Air Force
- Rank: Major
- Commands: Squadron Commander of Augusta Bell Helicopters

Naomi Karungi (1 December 1978 – 28 January 2020) was a Ugandan helicopter pilot who, at the time of her death, was the Squadron Commander of Augusta Bell Helicopters in the UPDF Air Force.

== Background and education ==
She was born in Ntungamo District, in the Western Region of Uganda. She attended local primary and secondary schools. She studied at Makerere University, graduating with a Bachelor of Arts degree in Social Work and Economics. She was then admitted to the East African Civil Aviation Academy, graduating with a Commercial Pilot Licence, after three years of instruction. Karungi was scheduled to travel to the United States later in 2020, to train as a helicopter flight instructor.

== Career ==
Around 2002, Naomi joined the UPDF Air Force before she obtained her pilot licence. Upon qualification as a pilot, she was posted to Entebbe Air Force Base. She selected to fly helicopters, as opposed to fixed-wing aircraft, according to her video testimony in 2019. She was encouraged to specialize in helicopters by the UPDF Air Force commanders at the time.

Through her entire career of 15 years (2005–2020) with the UPDF Air Force, she flew transport helicopters. In 2015, she piloted President Yoweri Museveni from his country home in Rwakitura to Entebbe.

She was the most experienced female helicopter pilot in the UPDF Air Force at the time of her death. At the rank of Major, she was the Commander of the Bell Helicopter Squadron in the UPDF Air Force.

== Death ==
On the morning of 28 January 2020, a UPDF Air Force Bell Jetranger helicopter registration number AF-302, en route from Kalama Armoured Warfare Training School to Entebbe Air Force Base carrying Major Karungi and Lieutenant Benon Wakalo, a cadet pilot, crashed into Ndese Hill, near Bulo, in Butambala District, during a tropical thunderstorm. Both flight crew died at the scene. They were on their way from Kabamba on a joint training exercise for air defense forces. The exercise had been cancelled due to bad weather.

== See also ==
- Kwatsi Alibaruho
- Tina Drazu
- Michael Etiang
- Kokoro Janda
- Robert Kateera
- Vanita Kayiwa
- Brian Mushana Kwesiga
- Rebecca Mpagi
- Robert Wakhweya
