= Kenneth Kiyemba =

Ugandan airline pilot

- Born: Uganda
- Citizenship: Ugandan
- Education: Kings College Budo; East African Civil Aviation Academy; Epic Flight Academy; US Airways Flight Training Center
- Occupations: Airline Pilot & Business Executive
- Known for: Professional competence
- Title: First Officer at Uganda National Airlines Company & Director of Administration at Uganda Professional Pilots' Association

Kenneth Kiyemba is a Ugandan airline pilot and business executive, who serves as a commercial pilot at Uganda National Airlines Company, the revived national airline of Uganda.

== Background and education ==
Kiyemba was born in Uganda and attended primary school locally. He attended Bishop's Senior School Mukono, before he transferred to Kings College Budo, a mixed boarding middle and high school, in Wakiso District, where he obtained his High School Diploma.

He then went on to obtain his Commercial pilot licence from the East African Civil Aviation Academy in Soroti, Uganda. He underwent further flight training at Epic Flight Academy, located at New Smyrna Beach Municipal Airport, in Volusia County, Florida, United States.

In 2019, he completed training on the Bombardier CRJ900 at the US Airways Flight Training Center, in Phoenix, Arizona, United States.

== Career ==
In 2019, he was hired as a First Officer pilot on the CRJ900 by Uganda National Airlines Company, trading as Uganda Airlines. He was suspended as a pilot in May 2021.

== Other considerations ==
He concurrently serves as the Director of Administration at Uganda Professional Pilots' Association. The association is responsible for promoting and safeguarding the interests of professional pilots and aeronautic engineers in Uganda.

== See also ==
- Kwatsi Alibaruho
- Tina Drazu
- Michael Etiang
- Kokoro Janda
- Robert Kateera
- Vanita Kayiwa
- Brian Mushana Kwesiga
- Robert Wakhweya
