= Ephraim Bagenda =

Ugandan aeronautical engineer

- Born: Uganda
- Citizenship: Uganda
- Occupations: Aeronautical Engineer & Business Executive
- Known for: Business, Management
- Title: Director of Engineering and Maintenance; Uganda National Airlines Company

Ephraim Kalyebara Bagenda is a Ugandan aeronautical engineer and business executive, who serves as the Director of Engineering and Maintenance at Uganda National Airlines Company, the revived national airline of Uganda, effective October 2019.

Before that, from January 2018, until October 2019, he served as the managing director and chief executive officer of Uganda's national airline. He assumed that position in 2018, having served as the Director of Maintenance and Engineering at Rwandair, until late 2017.

== Education and training ==
Bagenda is a professional aircraft engineer.

== Career ==
In 2017, he served as the Director of maintenance and engineering at Rwandair, serving there for nearly six years.

In 2018, he was appointed as the managing director and CEO of the revived national carrier, Uganda Airlines, although a different member of the team had been considered for the job.

In July 2018, while at the Farnborough Airshow, he signed two memoranda of understanding, with aircraft manufacturers for six jets to re-open the airline.

The first agreement was with Bombardier Commercial Aircraft of Canada for a firm purchase order of four CRJ900-ER aircraft at an estimated total price of US$190 million. The four jets will feature the Bombardier Atmosphère Cabin; Uganda Airlines being the first carrier to operate that type of aircraft on the African continent.

The second agreement was with the European aerospace conglomerate, Airbus SA for a firm purchase of two A330-800 aircraft, featuring the improved and fuel-efficient Rolls-Royce Trent 7000. The long-haul jets will feature three-class cabins with maximum capacity of 261 passengers, comprising 20 seats in Business Class, 28 in Premium Economy and 213 in Economy Class.

In October 2019, he was named director of engineering and maintenance at Uganda Airlines and was replaced as CEO in acting capacity by Cornwell Muleya.

== See also ==
- Kwatsi Alibaruho
- Michael Etiang
- Gad Gasatura
- Kenneth Kiyemba
- Brian Mushana Kwesiga
- Rebecca Mpagi
- Josephine Wapakabulo
