= Tina Drazu =

Ugandan commercial flight captain

- Born: Arua, Arua District, Uganda
- Citizenship: Ugandan
- Occupation: Professional pilot
- Years active: 2011–present
- Title: Flight captain at Uganda National Airlines Company

Tina Drazu is a Ugandan airline transport pilot, who has served as a Flight captain at Uganda Airlines, Uganda's national carrier airline, on the CRJ900 equipment, since 10 November 2026. In addition, she flies as a first officer at the same airline, on the A330-841 aircraft, since February 2021. Before that, since April 2019, she was a first officer on the CRJ 900 aircraft, at the same airline. As of October 2023, she was one of the only two female first officers on the A330-841 at the airline.

== Background and education ==
Drazu was born in Arua District, in West Nile sub-region, in the Northern Region of Uganda. She obtained her commercial pilot licence from Cape Flying Services in South Africa in 2010.

In 2020, she was among the pilots selected to undergo training on the A330-800 equipment. She completed the type rating training at the Airbus Training Center in Miami, Florida, United States, in late 2020.

== Career ==
Drazu spent one year and three months flying with Asante Airlines in South Sudan, from January 2011 until March 2012. She was then employed by Aerolink Uganda from July 2012 to April 2019, as a line pilot. In 2013, while at Aerolink, she made captain on the Cessna 208 Caravan equipment.

In April 2019, Drazu was hired by Uganda National Airlines Company, as one of a small number of female pilots at the airline. As of February 2021, Drazu was one of five female aviators at Uganda Airlines, out of 50 pilots at the airline. She and Vanita Kayiwa were the only two women who were members of the cockpit crew on the A330-841 aircraft at Uganda Airlines, at that time. Drazu and Kayiwa are role models for young Ugandan women who want to pursue a career in aviation. The two have gone further than any woman before them.

== Other considerations ==
As of April 2024, Drazu is the elected general secretary of the Uganda Professional Pilots' Association (UPPA).

== See also ==
- Kwatsi Alibaruho
- Michael Etiang
- Kokoro Janda
- Vanita Kayiwa
- Brian Mushana Kwesiga
- Robert Wakhweya
