= Robert Wakhweya =

Ugandan commercial airline pilot

Robert Bwayo Wakhweya
- Born: Uganda
- Citizenship: Ugandan
- Education: St. Mary's College Kisubi (High School Diploma)
- Alma mater: East African Civil Aviation Academy (Commercial Pilot Licence) (ICAO Airline Transport Pilots License)
- Occupation: Professional pilot
- Known for: Aviation
- Title: Captain & Chief Pilot at Uganda Airlines

Robert Bwayo Wakhweya is a Ugandan airline pilot, who serves as the Chief Pilot of Uganda Airlines, the revived national airline of Uganda, effective March 2023. He concurrently serves as a Captain on the A330-800 equipment at the airline. He has worked with Uganda Airlines since November 2020.

== Background and education ==
He is a Ugandan national by birth. He attended St. Mary's College Kisubi for his High School education. He obtained his Commercial pilot licence from the East African Civil Aviation Academy, in Soroti, in the Eastern Region of Uganda. Later, he obtained the ICAO Airline Transport Pilot Licence.

Over the years he has obtained type-rating and has piloted the following aircraft as either First Officer or Captain: Let L-410 Turbolet, McDonnell Douglas DC-10, McDonnell Douglas MD-80, Boeing 737, McDonnell Douglas DC-9, Airbus A320 family, Airbus A330 and Airbus A350.

== Career ==
Following his graduation from Soroti Flying School, he was retained as a flying instructor at the school. Over the years, he has flown with Eagle Air Uganda, United Airlines Uganda and DAS Air Cargo.

He then flew with the defunct Air Uganda on the McDonnell Douglas MD-87, before transferring to Astral Aviation based in neighboring Kenya. In the 2010s he joined Qatar Airways and flew the A320 and A350, eventually becoming Captain on both aircraft classes. At Qatar Airways, he served as Captain on the A350 aircraft for 8 years and 7 months before being hired by Uganda Airlines. As of November 2021, he had flown a total of more than 13,500 hours. Of those, 7,800 hours were on jet aircraft and more than 3,000 hours were "Jet Command" hours, where Captain Wakhweya was in command of the jet in question.

== Chief Pilot ==
The first Chief Pilot at Uganda Airlines was Michael Etiang, starting in April 2019. In November 2022, Michael Etiang was replaced by Phillip Sebunya, in a re-organization maneuver that followed the replacement of the entire board and most of the senior management. In March 2023, Robert Wakhweya was appointed Chief Pilot at the airline.

== Other considerations ==
Captain Robert Wakhweya, being one of the most experienced cockpit crew members at the airline, has played major roles in the history of the A330-800 at Uganda Airlines.

1. As of December 2020, he was one of the initial 34 pilots that Uganda Airlines hired to fly its A330-800s.
2. He was a member of the Ugandan cockpit crew who flew the first A300-800, registration 5X-NIL, on its delivery flight from Toulouse Airport in France to Entebbe International Airport in Uganda, as Flight UR404, on 21 December 2020.
3. He was the Pilot in command on the first ever non-stop UR flight from Entebbe (EBB) to Jeddah (JED) on 20 June 2023.
4. He captained the maiden direct flight between EBB, Uganda and BOM, India, as flight UR430 on 7 October 2023.

== See also ==
- Kwatsi Alibaruho
- Tina Drazu
- Michael Etiang
- Kokoro Janda
- Vanita Kayiwa
- Brian Mushana Kwesiga
- Emmanuel Bwayo Wakhweya
