= Vanita Kayiwa =

Ugandan commercial flight captain

- Born: Buziga, Makindye Division, Kampala, Uganda
- Citizenship: Uganda
- Education: East African Civil Aviation Academy (Commercial pilot licence) (ICAO Airline Transport Pilots License)
- Occupation: Commercial flight captain
- Title: Flight Captain at Uganda National Airlines Company

Vanita Kayiwa (Note: Sometimes spelled Vernita Kayiwa) is a Ugandan aviator, who serves as a Flight captain at Uganda National Airlines Company, Uganda's national airline carrier, on the CRJ900 equipment, since 10 November 2026. She contemporaneously flies as a first officer at the same airline on the A330-841 aircraft, since February 2021. Before that, effective April 2019, she served as a first officer on the CRJ 900 equipment, at the same airline.

== Background and education ==
Kayiwa was born in Buziga, a neighborhood in Makindye Division, in Kampala, Uganda's capital and largest city. She attended Gayaza High School for her secondary education. She obtained her ICAO Airline Transport Pilots License from the East African Civil Aviation Academy, in Soroti, in the Eastern Region of Uganda. She then obtained more commercial pilots qualification from South Africa.

Later, she completed type rating training on the CRJ900 at CAE Phoenix, in Mesa, Arizona, United States. In 2019, she was a member of the cockpit crew that piloted the inaugural flight from Entebbe International Airport to Kilimanjaro International Airport, on the CRJ900.

In 2020, she was among the pilots selected to train on the A330-800 aircraft. She completed the type rating training at Airbus Training Centre in Miami, Florida, during the fourth quarter of that year.

== Career ==
Kayiwa has spent most of her flying career at Air Serv Limited, piloting Cessna 208 Caravans. She first flew as a first officer, before she was promoted to captain on the Cessna 208, in 2016. She is the first Ugandan woman to make captain at Air Serv Limited since that airline was founded in 1987.

In April 2019, she was hired by Uganda National Airlines Company, as one of a small number of female pilots at the airline. She was part of the cockpit crew that made the inaugural flight between Entebbe, Uganda (EBB) and Kilimanjaro, Tanzania (KIA), in 2019.

As of February 2021, she was one of the five female pilots at Uganda Airlines, out of a total of 50 aviators. At that time, she and Tina Drazu were the only two female pilots who were part of the cockpit crew on the A330-841 equipment at Uganda Airlines.

== Other considerations ==
As of April 2024, she is the elected "female pilot representative" on the management team of the Uganda Professional Pilots' Association (UPPA). As of November 2026, she was certified as captain on the Cessna 208 Caravan class of aircraft and on the CRJ900 aircraft class. Contemporaneously she was certified as first officer on the A330neo aircraft class.

== See also ==
- Kwatsi Alibaruho
- Tina Drazu
- Michael Etiang
- Kokoro Janda
- Brian Mushana Kwesiga
- Robert Wakhweya
