= Kokoro Janda =

Ugandan commercial airline pilot

- Born: 1976 (age 49–50); Arua District, Uganda
- Citizenship: Uganda
- Education: Federal Aviation Administration (Commercial Pilot Licence); International Civil Aviation Organization (ICAO Airline Transport Pilots License); Lynn University (Bachelor of Science in Aviation Management)
- Occupation: Professional pilot
- Known for: Aviation
- Title: Captain & Testing Pilot at Uganda Airlines

Kokoro Janda is a Ugandan airline pilot, who serves as a Captain on the A330-800 equipment at Uganda National Airlines Company, the revived national airline of Uganda. He has worked with Uganda Airlines since 2021.

== Background and education ==
He is a Ugandan national by birth. He hails from Arua District. He holds a Commercial pilot licence from the Federal Aviation Administration in the United States. He also holds an ICAO Airline Transport Pilot Licence. He graduated from Lynn University, in Boca Raton, Florida, United States, with a Bachelor of Science degree in Aviation Management.

== Career ==
Following his graduation from Lynn University, he first served as a sales executive of business jets and turbo prop aircraft, based in Boca Raton Florida, in the United States. Later he began flying with general aviation companies including Transworld Safaris (Kenya), Selous Safari Company (Tanzania), Fly ALS (Kenya) and East African Safari Express (Kenya).

In 2008, he was hired by the now defunct Air Uganda. He left in 2010, when Astral Aviation hired him as Captain on their cargo planes. In 2018, he was hired as Captain on the A320 family aircraft at Jetstar Pacific Airlines, at that time a joint venture between Vietnam Airlines (70 percent) and Qantas (30 percent). He flew A320 family aircraft, as captain for over two years.

As of September 2021, he was type-rated on the following aircraft classes: Cessna 208 Caravan, Beechcraft King Air, McDonnell Douglas MD-82, McDonnell Douglas MD-83, McDonnell Douglas MD-87, McDonnell Douglas DC-9, Airbus A320 family and A330neo. He was the first pilot to pass the test to fly the A330neo equipment at UR, the revived national airline of Uganda as Captain.

== Other considerations ==
Captain Kokoro Janda, is one of the senior pilots at Uganda Airlines. He is flight safety officer at the airline. He also serves as a training captain for Captains and First Officers on the A330-841 equipment. In addition, he is a check captain, who tests pilots trained by other captains at the airline. He was a member of the cockpit crew who piloted the inaugural direct flight between EBB, in Uganda and LOS, in Nigeria as Flight UR900 on 19 October 2023. He was also the pilot in command on the Uganda Airlines Airbus A330-800 maiden flight to Nairobi on 27 August 2021.

Captain Kokoro Janda was part of the three-person cockpit crew who piloted Flight UR445 from Dubai International Airport to Entebbe International Airport on 30 November 2024. That flight, with captain Peter Thomas as the pilot-in-command also had First Officer Ivan Massa in the cockpit. It was the last commercial flight captained by Peter Thomas, who retired after that.

== See also ==
- Kwatsi Alibaruho
- Tina Drazu
- Michael Etiang
- Vanita Kayiwa
- Brian Mushana Kwesiga
- Emmanuel Bwayo Wakhweya
