= Bulo =

Bulo may refer to:

== Religion ==
- A Dogon word for "sacrifice" in Dogon religion and language — "Dogon (sacrifice)". (Ezra, Kate, Art of the Dogon: Selections from the Lester Wunderman Collection. Volume 21, Issue 4 of African arts. Metropolitan Museum of Art (1988), p. 48 )

== People ==
- Bulo C Rani (1920–1993), Indian music director
- Jorgo Bulo (1939–2015), Albanian philologist, historian, and literary critic

== Places ==
- Bulo, Albania, a village in the former municipality Qendër Libohovë
- Bulo, Uganda
- Bulo Bulo, Bolivia
