= Robert Kateera =

Ugandan social entrepreneur and commercial pilot

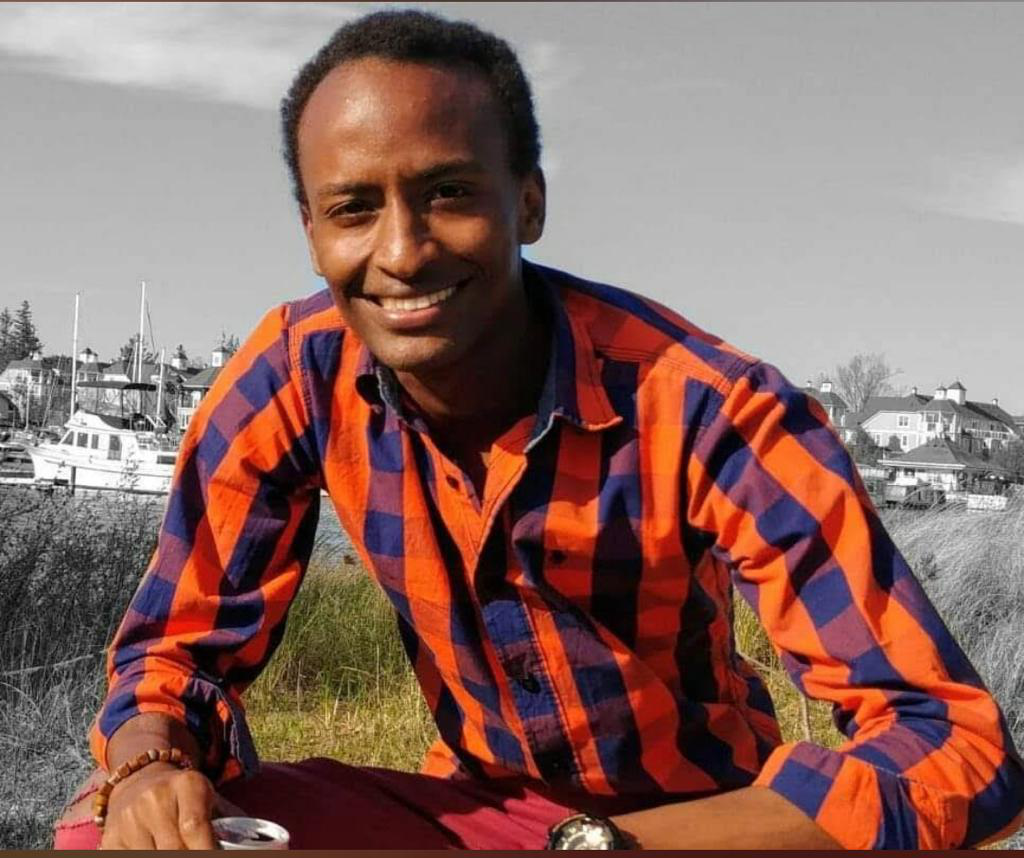
- Robert Kateera
- Born: 19 April 1995 (age 31); Kampala, Uganda
- Citizenship: Uganda
- Education: "Toronto Airways Canadian Flight Academy"
- Occupations: Social Entrepreneur, Commercial pilot and Activist
- Organization: Trudea Youth Council Foundation

Robert Kateera sometimes spelt as Katera (born 19 April 1995) is a Ugandan social entrepreneur, commercial pilot and activist based in Canada. He is the founder of Trudeau Youth Council Foundation, a foundation he founded after his cousin was born without a shinbone. Through the foundation he provides prosthetics and other walking aids to children 18 and under in Uganda.

== Early life and education ==
Kateera was born in Kampala, Uganda where he lived with his parents and siblings. He did his primary school at Uganda Martyrs Primary School. After attending secondary school at Taibah College School, he relocated to Canada where he did his flight training with, a Canadian flight academy in British Columbia.

== Career ==
=== Aviation career ===
Katera is a professional pilot for Uganda Airlines, the national carrier. He received his flight training at "Toronto Airways Canadian Flight Academy". In 2019, he was recognized as one of the new pilots trained to operate the airline's newly acquired aircraft, meeting with President Yoweri Museveni during this period. He has frequently cited flying as a lifelong childhood dream.

Social Entrepreneurship and Activism Katera is the founder of Trudeau Youth Council Foundation organization, established in 2019. The foundation focuses providing prosthetics and mobility aids to underprivileged children and youth (ages 2 to 18) in Uganda and advocating for young amputees and those with limb disorders to help them become self-sufficient. In late 2022, he was appointed to lead a youth council in Canada, a role intended to bridge Canadian investment with Ugandan human capital projects. In this capacity, he advocates for policies supporting youth entrepreneurship, education, and digital skills development across East Africa. His humanitarian work is motivated by a personal desire to support others, often stating, "I am where I am today because someone has given me a shoulder... I want to reciprocate".

== Trudeau Youth Foundation ==
The Trudeau Youth Council Foundation is a non-profit organization founded in 2019 by Ugandan social entrepreneur and pilot Robert Katera. He started Trudeau Youth Council Foundation, after his cousin was born without a tibia and a knee cap. As a result, Kateera labored nonstop to find a solution. Getting an artificial limb was the idea he had ever done for his cousin, and it was from there that the desire to aid other children, particularly those who couldn't afford one, arose. The Foundation advocates for young amputees and children with limb disorders, as well as to work closely with specialists and the community to ensure that they are self-sufficient. The foundation seeks to accomplish this by providing prosthetic and orthodontic devices to underprivileged youngsters (ages 2 to 18).

=== Mission and core activities ===
The foundation is primarily dedicated to improving the lives of underprivileged youth in Uganda through the following initiatives:

- Prosthetic and Orthopedic Services. Its central mission is to provide artificial limbs and mobility aids to children and youth between the ages of 2 and 18.
- Self-Sufficiency Advocacy. Beyond medical support, the organization works with specialists and community leaders to help young amputees and those with limb disorders become self-sufficient.
- Capacity Building. The foundation aims to link skilled Ugandans with community-based initiatives and resources in Canada to elevate their career opportunities.

== Recognition ==
Presidential Recognition (2019). Katera was recognized and met with President Yoweri Museveni as one of the specialized pilots trained to operate the newly acquired aircraft for the national carrier, Uganda Airlines.

Youth Council Leadership (2022). He was appointed to lead a youth council in Canada, a role designed to facilitate Canadian investment into Ugandan human capital projects.

Philanthropic Leadership. Through his Trudeau Youth Council Foundation, he is acknowledged for providing prosthetics and mobility aids to underprivileged youth in Uganda.

== See also ==
- Kwatsi Alibaruho
- Michael Etiang
- Brian Mushana Kwesiga
