= Bulo, Uganda =

Ugandan settlement

Bulo
- Map of Uganda showing location of Bulo
- Coordinates: 00°06′53″N 32°00′05″E
- Country: Uganda
- Region: Central Region
- Districts: Butambala District
- Elevation: 1,250 m (4,100 ft)
- Time zone: UTC+3 (EAT)

Bulo is a settlement in Butambala District in the Central Region of Uganda.

== Location ==
The settlement is in Bulo Parish, Bulo Sub-county, being one of the seven parishes in that administrative unit.

Bulo is approximately 68 kilometres (42 mi), by road, southwest of Mpigi, the nearest large town. This is approximately 97 kilometres (60 mi), by road, southwest of Kampala, the capital and largest city of Uganda. The coordinates of Bulo are 0°06'53.0"N, 32°00'05.0"E (Latitude:0.114722; Longitude:32.001389).

== Overview ==
On the morning of 28 January 2020, a UPDF Air Force Bell Jet Ranger helicopter, registration number AF-302, on a training mission, with two crew members, crashed into nearby Ndese Hill, killing both occupants.

The deceased were later identified as Major Naomi Karungi, Commander of the UPDF Bell Jet Ranger Squadron and Cadet Pilot Lieutenant Benon Wakalo, both based at Entebbe Air Force Base.

== See also ==
- Gombe General Hospital
