= Michael Etiang =

Ugandan commercial airline pilot

- Born: Tororo District, Uganda
- Citizenship: Ugandan
- Education: East African Civil Aviation Academy (commercial pilot licence) (ICAO airline transport pilot licence)
- Alma mater: London School of Oriental and African Studies (bachelor's degree in Law and Politics)
- Occupations: Airline pilot & business executive
- Title: Captain and former chief pilot at Uganda Airlines

Michael Etiang is a Ugandan airline pilot and business executive, who served as the chief pilot of Uganda Airlines, the revived national airline of Uganda, from April 2019. until November 2022. He concurrently serves as captain at Uganda Airlines, on both the CRJ900-ER and the A330-841 equipment.

== Background and education ==
Etiang was born in Tororo District. His late father, Paul Orono Etiang (1938—2020), was a civil servant, politician, diplomat and community leader. Etiang attended Bentham Grammar School, in the United Kingdom. He obtained a bachelor's degree in Law and Politics from the School of Oriental and African Studies at the University of London.

In 1993, Etiang was admitted to the East African Civil Aviation Academy, in Soroti, Uganda, where he obtained his commercial pilot licence. Later, he obtained an ICAO airline transport pilot licence. Over the years he has flown for a number of domestic and foreign airlines including Eagle Air Uganda, ZanAir, DAS Air Cargo, Virgin Nigeria, JetLink Express, Rwandair, Fly540 (today Fastjet), and Garuda Indonesia. As of April 2018, Etiang had over 18 years of flying experience, with over 12,000 flying hours on his record.

== Career ==
At the time he was hired for this job, he was serving as the Training Manager (CRJ Aircraft) at RwandAir, where he has been employed since 2012. He has also served as training captain at Fly540 and Jetlink, both in neighbouring Kenya. He played the same role at Garuda Indonesia, the national airline of Indonesia. His aviation career spanned over twenty years, as of 2019.

In his new position as chief pilot at Uganda National Airlines Company, he is responsible for making sure that all pilots are trained and are current with their competencies and skills. He also manages flight and ground personnel, schedules flights and coordinates aircraft maintenance. He serves as a member of the airline's senior management team.

He was part of the four-person Ugandan cockpit crew who piloted the first two CRJ-900 aircraft purchased by Uganda National Airlines Company, from Mirabel, Quebec, Canada, to Entebbe, Uganda, in April 2019.

In 2020, he underwent further training and qualified as captain on the Airbus 330 class of aircraft. On 22 December 2020, Etiang led the crew who flew the first A330-800 to join the Uganda Airlines fleet. The aircraft, 5X-NIL named Mount Elgon, flew from Toulouse, France to Entebbe, Uganda, as Flight UR404.

== See also ==
- Kwatsi Alibaruho
- Brian Mushana Kwesiga
- Robert Kateera
