= Airbus A330neo =

Wide-body jet airliner developed from A330

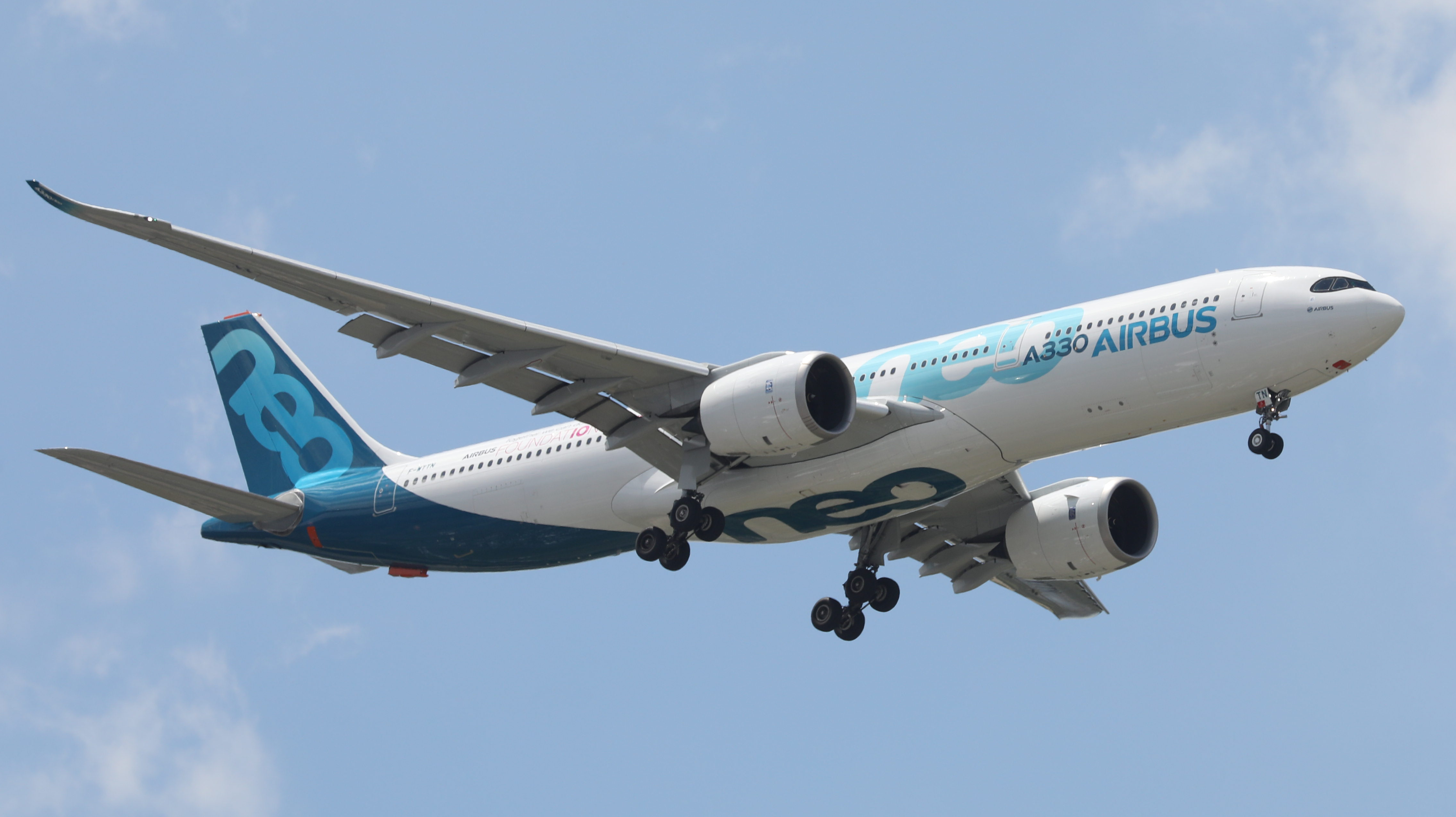
- The A330-900 at the 2019 Paris Air Show in the Airbus livery

General information
- Role: Wide-body airliner
- National origin: Multi-national (Note: Final assembly in France.)
- Manufacturer: Airbus
- Status: In service
- Primary users: Delta Air Lines: TAP Air Portugal; Condor; ITA Airways
- Number built: 203 as of October 2026

History
- Manufactured: 2015–present
- Introduction date: 15 December 2018 with TAP Air Portugal
- First flight: 19 October 2017; 9 years ago
- Developed from: Airbus A330
- Variant: Airbus A330 MRTT+

The Airbus A330neo ("neo" for "New Engine Option") is a wide-body airliner developed by Airbus from the original Airbus A330 (now A330ceo – "Current Engine Option"). A new version with modern engines comparable with those developed for the Boeing 787 was called for by operators of the A330ceo. It was launched on 14 July 2014 at the Farnborough Airshow, promising 14% better fuel economy per seat. It is exclusively powered by the Rolls-Royce Trent 7000 which has double the bypass ratio of its predecessor.

Its two versions are based on the A330-200 and -300: the -800 has a range of 8,100 nmi (15,000 km; 9,320 mi) with 257 passengers while the -900 covers 7,350 nmi (13,610 km; 8,460 mi) with 287 passengers. The -900 made its maiden flight on 19 October 2017 and received its EASA type certificate on 26 September 2018; it was first delivered to TAP Air Portugal on 26 November 2018 and entered service on 15 December. The -800 made its first flight on 6 November 2018 and received EASA type certification on 13 February 2020; the first two -800s were delivered to Kuwait Airways on 29 October 2020 and entered service on 20 November. As of October 2026, a total of 559 A330neo family aircraft had been ordered by more than 30 customers, of which 203 aircraft had been delivered.

== Development ==
=== Studies ===
The initial A350 concept, based on the A330ceo, before its redesign into the all-new A350XWB, was similar to what became the A330neo.

At the Boeing 787 launch in 2004, Airbus' initial response was an improved A330. After negative feedback from airlines and lessors, the A350 XWB became a new design in 2006. After the A320neo launch in December 2010 and its commercial success, the largest airline of Malaysia, AirAsia – an all-Airbus operator – asked Airbus to re-engine the A330. New engines like the GEnx or Rolls-Royce Trent 1000 developed for the 787 could offer a 12%–15% fuel burn improvement, and sharklets at least 2%.

Airbus sales chief John Leahy's argument was that the lower purchase price of an A330 even without new engines make the economics of buying an A330 competitive at midrange routes with that of the Boeing 787. An A330neo would accelerate the demise of the similarly sized A350-800. Airbus also considered re-engining the A380 but was wary of having two major modification programs simultaneously.

In March 2014, Delta Air Lines expressed an interest in the A330neo to replace its ageing, 20+-year-old Boeing 767-300ER jets. In the 250-300-seat market, CIT Group believed an A330neo enables profitability on shorter ranges where the longer-range A350 and Boeing 787 are not optimised. CIT said that the A350-800 was not as efficient as it would like, and Air Lease Corp. added that the company did not consider it reasonable to take the A350-800 and A330neo as they saw no sustainable coexistence of the two aircraft.

AirAsia X ended flights to London and Paris from Kuala Lumpur in 2012 because their Airbus A340s were not fuel-efficient enough and would try again with A330s. As Airbus gradually increased the output of the new A350, prolonging the production run of the A330 could help to maintain profitability. After Emirates cancelled 70 orders for the A350, Airbus said it continued to work on re-engining the smaller A330.

=== Launch ===
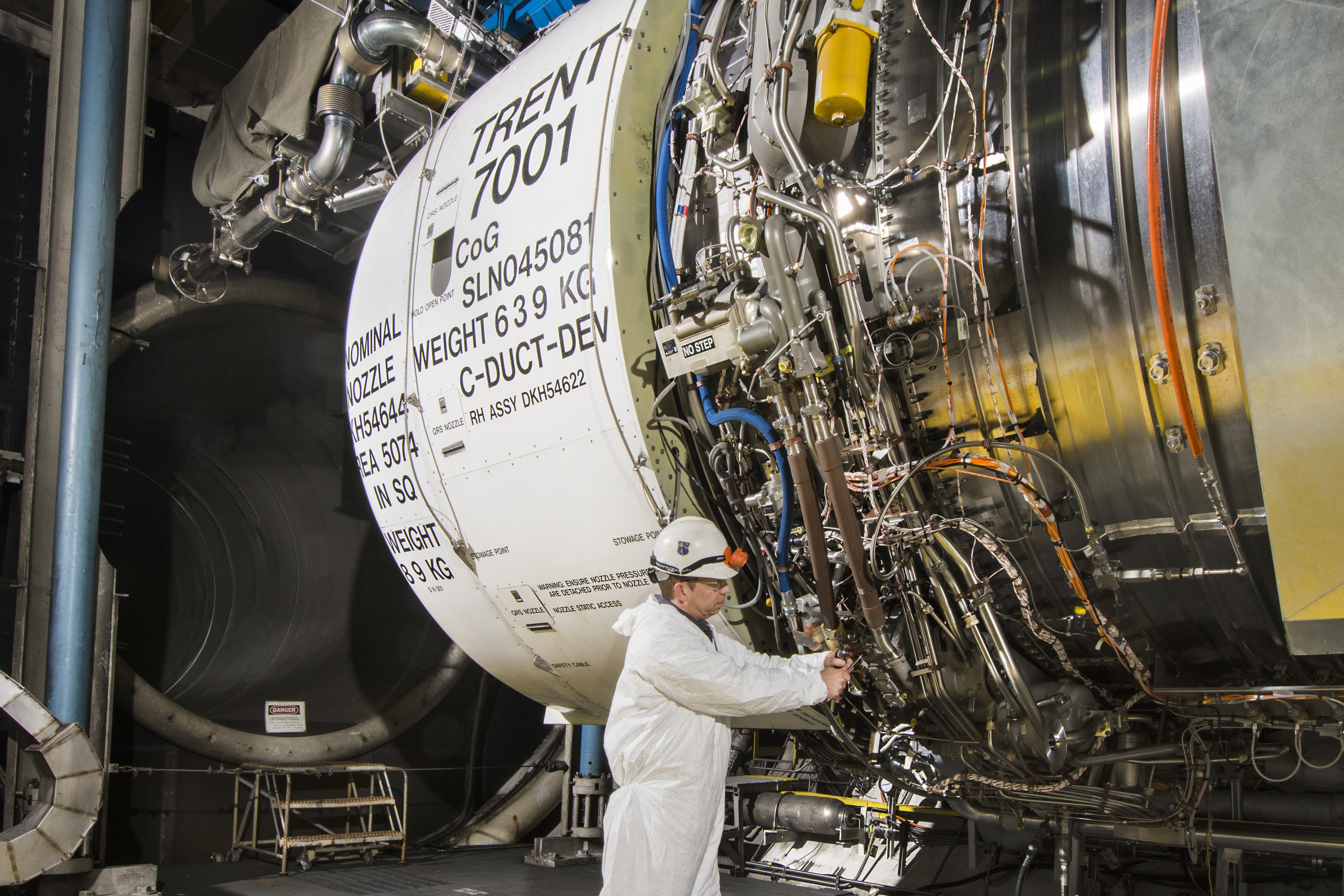
The Rolls-Royce Trent 7000 being tested at Arnold Engineering Development Complex

On 14 July 2014 at the Farnborough Airshow, Airbus launched the A330neo programme, to be powered by the new Rolls-Royce Trent 7000. It would improve the fuel burn per seat by 14%. Airbus hoped to sell 1,000 A330neo aircraft. Its range would increase by 400 nautical miles (740 km; 460 mi) and although 95% of the parts would be common with the A330ceo, maintenance costs would be lower. New winglets, 3.7 metres wider and similar to those of the A350 XWB, still within ICAO category E airport requirements, along with new engine pylons, would improve aerodynamics by 4%.

The A330neo's development costs, an estimated $2 billion (£1.18 billion) , were expected to have an impact of around −0.7% on Airbus's return on sales target from 2015 to 2017. Airbus stated that lower capital cost would make the A330neo the most cost-efficient medium-range wide-body airliner. Airbus said that it could pursue demand for 4,000 aircraft and that there was an open market for 2,600 jets not already addressed by backlogs with operators already using A330s. Aerodynamic modifications would include a re-twisted wing and optimised slats.

In 2014, The Airline Monitor's Ed Greenslet stated that the A330neo would have the advantage of not being designed to fly 8,000 nmi (9,200 mi), unlike the A350 and Boeing 787 which were thus less economical on shorter routes, although "the vast majority of long-haul markets is 4,000 nmi or less". He also believed that an "A330neo would enjoy a monopoly in its segment instantly", with the Boeing 767 "essentially out of production", the Boeing 757 not replaced while the A321neo and the 737-9 are smaller and had less range, and that launching the A330neo would probably kill the smallest A350-800.

John Leahy estimated that the A330-900 would have operating costs on par with the 787-9, but would be available at 25% lower capital costs and could reach a production rate of 10 per month after a 7/8 per month rate at the production start. Both A330neo variants were expected to have a maximum take-off weight of 242 t. The type design was frozen in late 2015.

Boeing Vice Chairman and Commercial Airplanes CEO Ray Conner dismissed the A330neo as 2004 revamp which cannot match the 787's direct operating costs, being nine tonnes (20,000 lb) heavier and having a wing only slightly improved from the 1980s design, and claimed the 787-10 was almost 30% more efficient per-seat than the previous A330-300 and that a new engine would not close the gap – but he acknowledged that it could be a threat as it put pressure on Boeing as it sought to break even after 850–1,000 787 deliveries.

=== Production ===
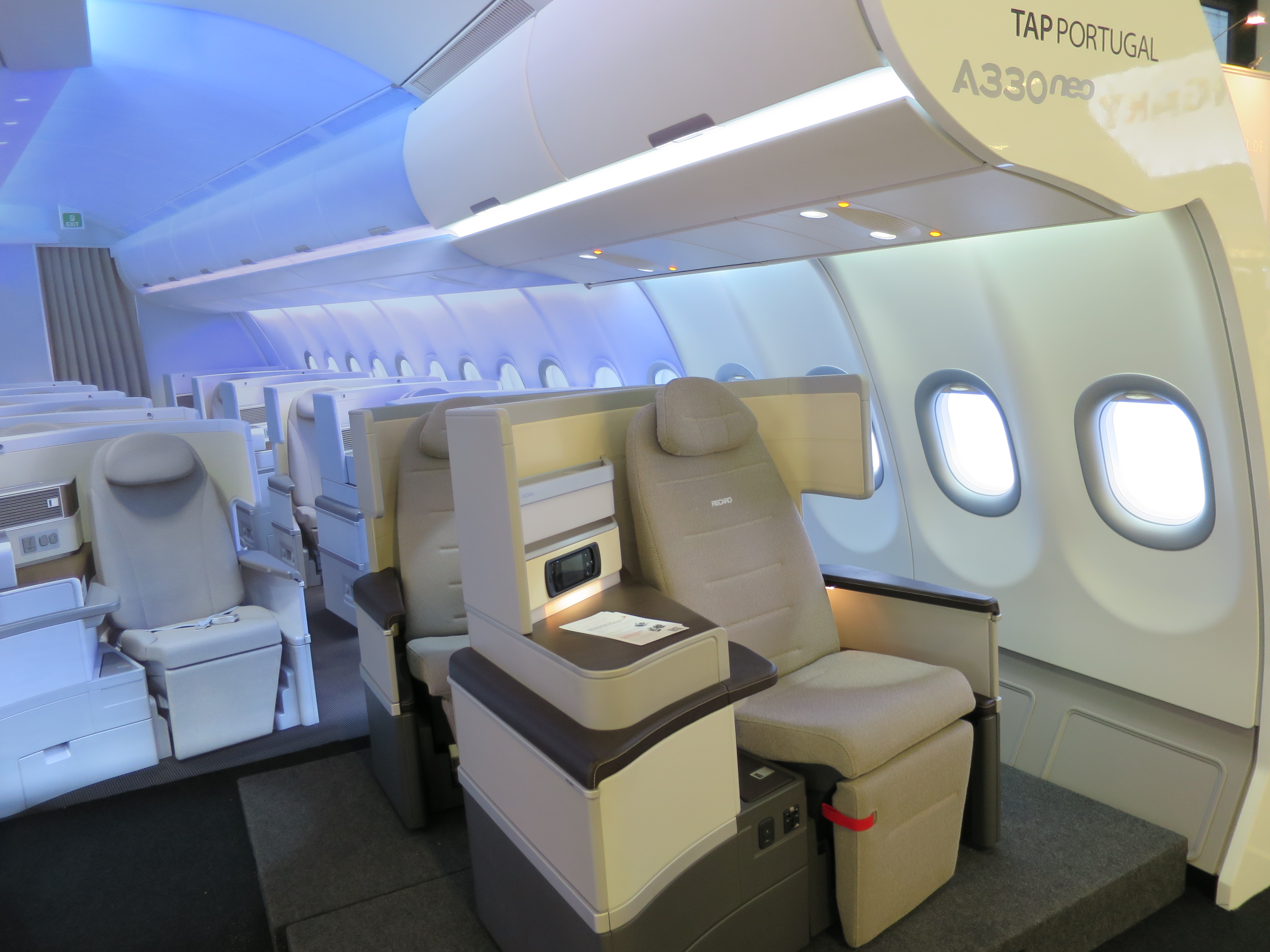
TAP Air Portugal interior mockup at ITB Berlin 2017

On 7 September 2015, Airbus announced that it had begun production of the first A330neo with the construction of its centre wingbox and engine pylon. Final assembly of the first aircraft, an A330-900, started in September 2016 at the Airbus Toulouse site with the joining of the wings to the centre fuselage at the station 40. In December 2016, the programme schedule slipped by six weeks due to marginal engine development at Rolls-Royce, and launch customer TAP Air Portugal projected its first A330neo would be delivered in March 2018.

The first aircraft left the paint shop in December 2016, awaiting its engines. By April 2017, the Trent 7000s were to be installed later during the summer so that the first flight was delayed until September. Due to the delay, TAP Air Portugal was not expected to receive the first A330neo until the end of the first half of 2018, or even in the third quarter. The engines were shipped to Airbus in June. The aircraft complete with engines showed at Toulouse in September before its first flight.

Major structures of the first A330-800 were entering production in October 2017: high-lift devices are installed on the wing in Bremen, fuselage sections are built in Hamburg, the centre wing-box in Nantes, titanium engine pylons in Toulouse and sharklet wingtips in Korea. Its final assembly started in November 2017, on track for its planned first flight in mid-2018. Structural assembly was completed by February 2018, having its flight-test instruments installed and waiting for its engines before its 300h flight-test programme. At this time, production aircraft progressed through the final assembly line with the first 'Airspace' cabin interior being fitted.

A330 production was cut to 50 deliveries in 2019, with more than half of them re-engined A330neos. In April 2020, the production rate decreased from 3.5 to 2 per month due to the impact of the COVID-19 pandemic on aviation, and finished planes were stored while waiting for deferred deliveries. In 2018, unit cost was US$259.9 M for a -800 and US$296.4 M for a -900.

=== Flight testing ===
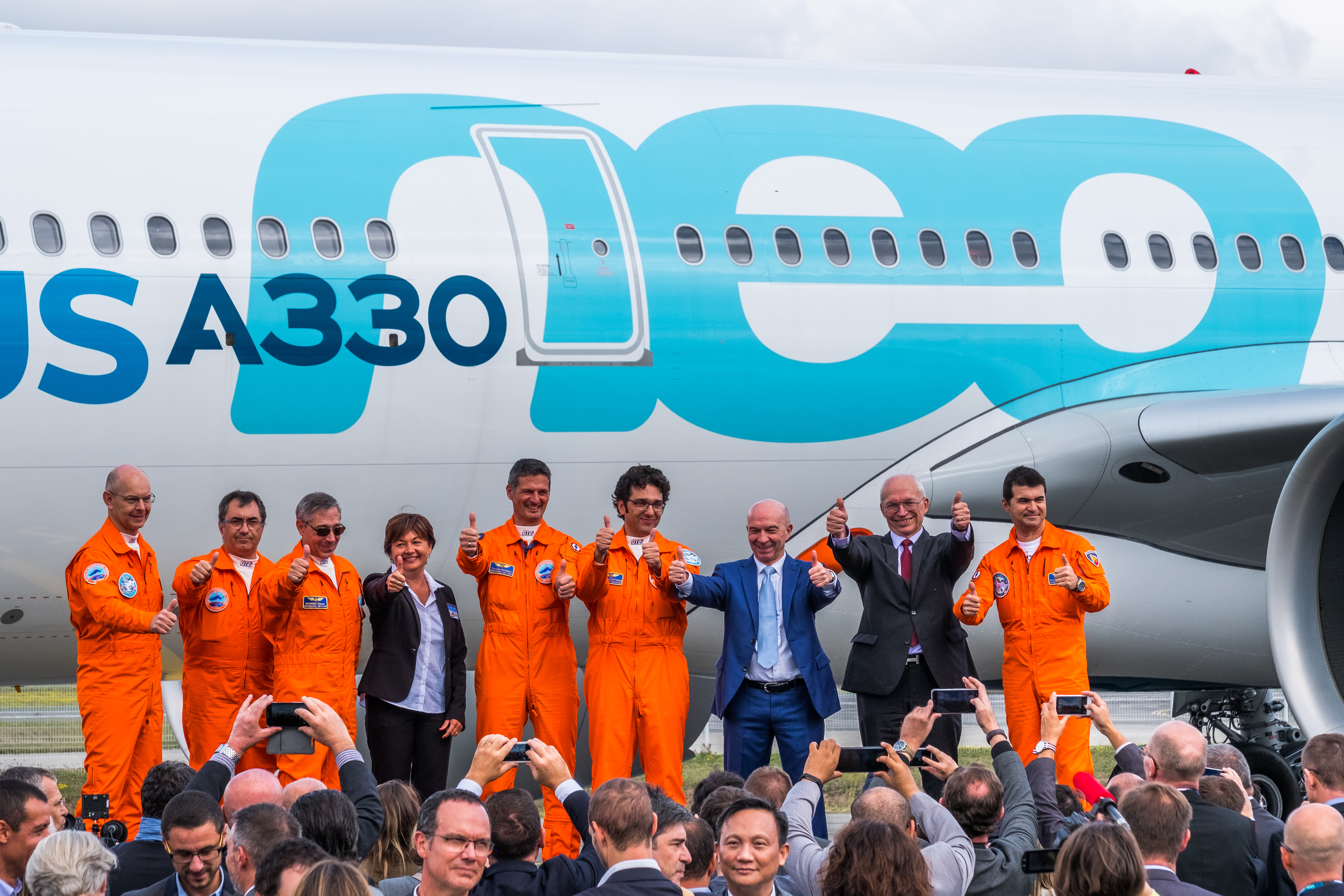
The first flight crew

The A330-900 first flight on 19 October 2017 was a debut of the 1,400 hours flight test campaign involving three prototypes plus the first production aircraft: 1,100 flight hours for the A330-900 and 300 flight hours for the A330-800, targeting mid-2018 EASA and FAA Type Certification. The 4h 15m flight reached 30,125 ft (9,182 m) and 502 kn (578 mph; 930 km/h). It should establish certain maximum operating points and achieve an initial handling qualities assessment including at high angle of attack. This first aircraft, MSN1795, was scheduled to perform 600 h and was to be joined the following month by the second, MSN1813, which will fly 500 h, before the third, MSN1819, the first customer aircraft for TAP Portugal with a complete cabin.

Two flight test engineers and two engine specialists monitored the 60GB per hour output of 1,375 sensors and 98,000 parameters, including strips of microelectromechanical systems to measure aerodynamic pressure distribution across the wing. MSN1795 was to undertake simulated icing tests and cold-weather tests in Canada, noise assessment, autoland testing and high angle-of-attack, minimum-unstick checks during rotation with a tail bumper. MSN1813 was to test natural icing conditions, assess hot and high conditions in the United Arab Emirates and La Paz, and fly 150h of route-proving; it has rakes and pressure sensors in the engine flows to compare actual thrust with ground bench measurements. MSN1819 was to validate the Airspace cabin interior fitting with artificial passengers for ventilation analysis and cabin environment measurements.

The second test aircraft made its maiden flight on 4 December, to be used to validate aerodynamic & engine performance and airline operations. By the end of January 2018, the first logged almost 200h in 58 flights while the second had accumulated nearly 120h in 30 flights. Its flight envelope was fully opened including flutter and stall tests to complete powerplant calibration and strake configuration has been frozen. Airbus commenced autopilot, autoland and high-speed performance testing, and was to move on to hot- and cold-weather tests, as well as noise and icing tests, over the following three months. As of 10 April 2018, the two test aircraft had logged over 200 flights and more than 700 hours, testing −27 °C cold weather, natural icing, crosswind landing, 37 °C and 8,000 ft (2,400 m) hot and high operations.

The first TAP Air Portugal aircraft made its first flight on 15 May 2018; it joined the two previous test aircraft to check the cabin systems: air conditioning, crew rest, etc. It started the final certification step on 18 June: function and reliability tests or route proving, including ETOPS, diversion airport landing, and testing ground handling over 150 flight test hours, as the flight test programme reached 1,000 hours. Entry into service was planned for the third quarter of 2018 and ETOPS was to be approved in October for 330min.

EASA granted the A330-941 type certificate on 26 September 2018, with ETOPS not yet approved. ETOPS 180 min was approved on 14 November, restricted to engines with fewer than 500 flight cycles. Airbus expects the FAA type certification with 180 min ETOPS by the end of 2018 and 330 min ETOPS in the first half of 2019. Beyond-180min ETOPS was approved by the EASA on 24 January 2019.

The maiden flight of the -800 took place on 6 November 2018; the 4h 4min flight inaugurated a 350h test program aiming for mid-2019 type certification, for delivery in the first half of 2020 to launch operator Kuwait Airways. By late March 2019, it was halfway through the 300-hour flight test programme, having completed 44 flights in 149 hours. The -800 received EASA type certification with 180-minute ETOPS on 13 February 2020; ETOPS clearance beyond 180 minutes was awarded on 2 April.

=== Entry into service ===
Leased from Avolon, the first A330-900 was delivered to TAP Air Portugal on 26 November 2018, featuring 298 seats: 34 full-flat business, 96 economy plus and 168 economy seats, and to be deployed from Portugal to the Americas and Africa. TAP made its first commercial flight on 15 December from Lisbon to São Paulo. The airline should receive 15 more A330neos in 2019 and fly the A330-900 from Lisbon to Chicago O'Hare and Washington Dulles from June 2019, both five times a week.

=== Increased takeoff weight ===
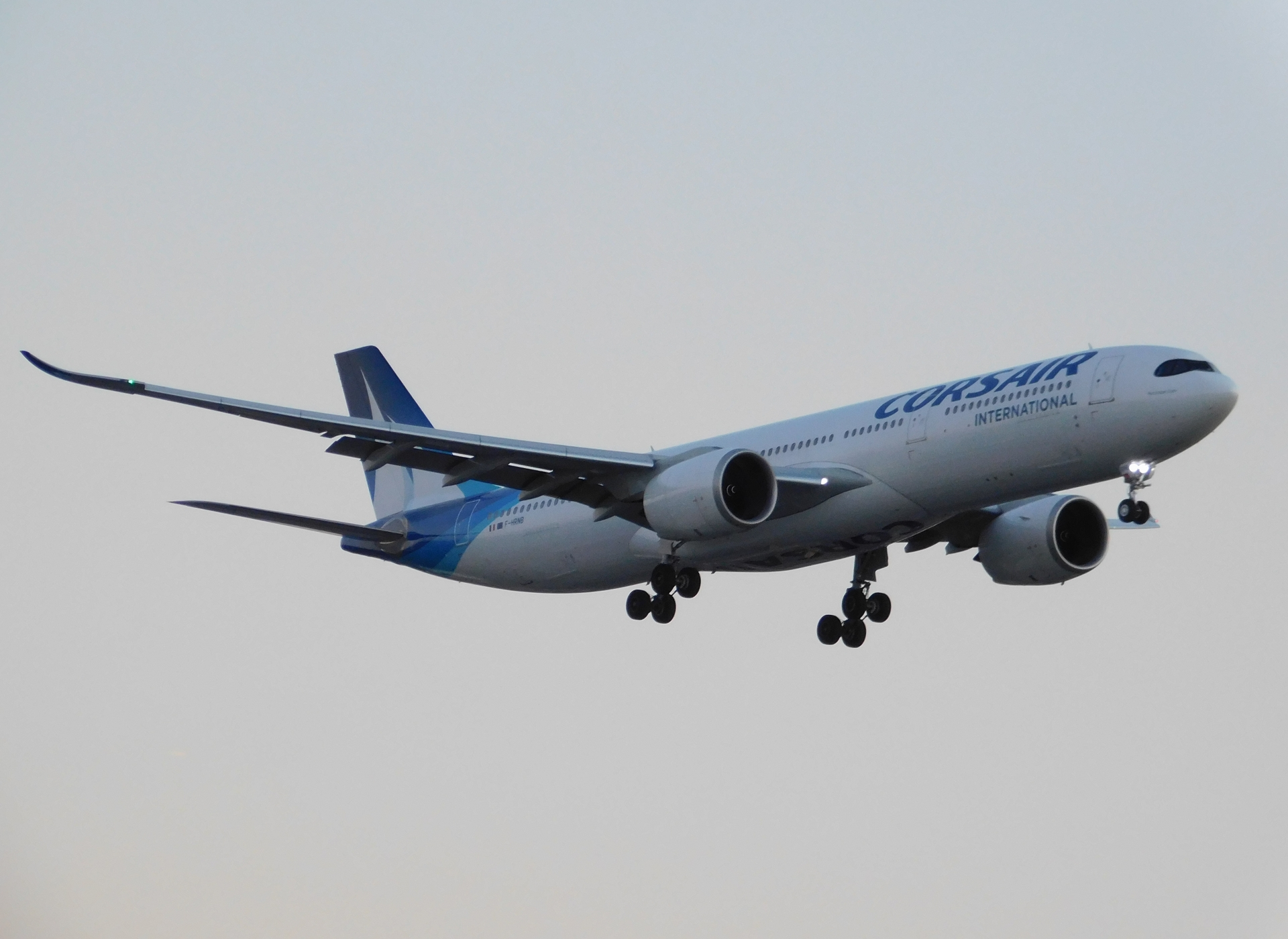
Corsair International took delivery of the first 251t Airbus A330-900 on 31 March 2021.

On the occasion of the 19 October 2017 first flight, an increase to 251 t (553,000 lb) MTOW by mid-2020 was announced, with a few changes to the landing gear and brakes, increasing its range by 700 or 1,000 nmi (810 or 1,150 mi; 1,300 or 1,900 km) compared to the current A330neo or A330ceo. The 251 t MTOW was confirmed by Airbus in November 2017. This gave the -900 a range of 7,200 nmi (8,300 mi; 13,300 km) and 8,150 nmi (9,380 mi; 15,090 km) for the -800. Test flights of the 251 t A330-900 started from 28 February 2020.

Airbus was expecting a short 30–40h test campaign, as multiple tests were conducted with the previous variant adapted to higher weight, including flight performance and noise assessment. The heavier structure allows a transpacific range and is balanced by a weight-reduction effort, keeping the same empty weight and payload. On 8 October 2020, the 251 t A330-900 was EASA-certified, before introduction by Corsair International. Retaining 99% spares commonality, it offers 6 t (13,000 lb) more payload while strengthening the landing-gear and extending the time before overhaul interval from 10 to 12 years. On 31 March 2021, Corsair took delivery of the first 251t Airbus A330-900 in a three-class, 352-seat configuration. The 251 t A330-800 was certified by EASA in April 2022.

On 11 June 2025, Airbus planned for 2028 a 253 t (558,000 lb) variant, while a 68,000 lbf (320 kN) thrust rating should be available from 2026.

=== Further certification for international markets ===
The Civil Aviation Administration of China (CAAC) granted the A330neo family its Validation of Type Certificate (VTC) in December 2024. Hainan Airlines hinted towards ordering 20 A330-900s with an order for galley parts from Safran in March 2024, while Hong Kong-based Cathay Pacific placed a firm order for 30 A330-900s later that August.

== Design ==
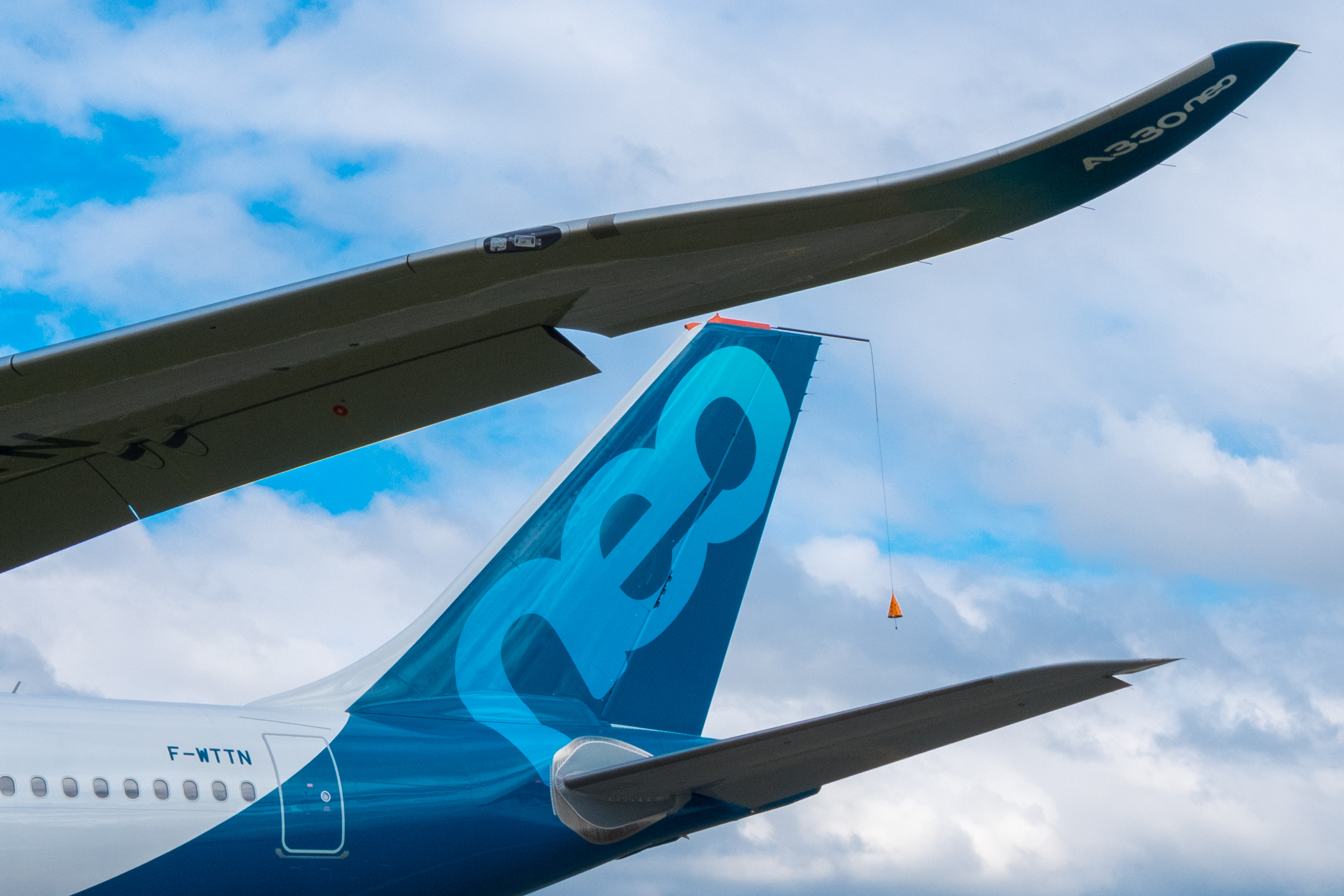
A350-inspired Sharklets

The A330neo is advertised as having a 12% fuel burn advantage per flight over the older A330 variants. This advantage comes from the 11% gain from the Trent 7000 and its larger 112-inch fan, compared to the 97.5-inch Trent 700 engine. However, this gain is negated by 3%–2% by additional weight, and 1% due to engine drag, but the sharklets and aero optimization regain 4%, restoring the advantage to 12%. Furthermore, fuel consumption per seat is improved by 2% due to the rearranged cabin (Space-Flex and Smart-Lav) with increased seating, offering a 14% fuel burn reduction per seat for the new −900 compared to the previous 235-tonne −300 version. The newer 242-tonne −300 is already 2% more efficient.

Since the fan is enlarged from 97 to 112 in (250 to 280 cm), the nacelles are mounted higher, necessitating extensive CFD analysis to avoid supersonic shock wave interference drag, as is the first slat's dog-tooth. The wing twist and belly fairings are tweaked to approach the lowest drag elliptical span-wise pressure distribution changed by the larger sharklets, like the flap track fairings shape to lower form drag.

Initially based on the largest 242t MTOW A330, Airbus was studying an improvement to 245 t (540,000 lb) MTOW for the A330neo, which would match the figure originally given for the Airbus A350-800 before it was sidelined in favor of the A330neo. This would give the -900 a 7,000 nmi (12,964 km; 8,055 mi) range to better compete with the 787-9’s 7,635 nmi (14,140 km; 8,786 mi) On the -800 at FL400, cruise fuel flow at Mach 0.82 and low weight is 4.7 to 5.2 t (10,000 to 11,000 lb) per hour at a higher weight and Mach 0.83.

=== Cabin and Cockpit ===
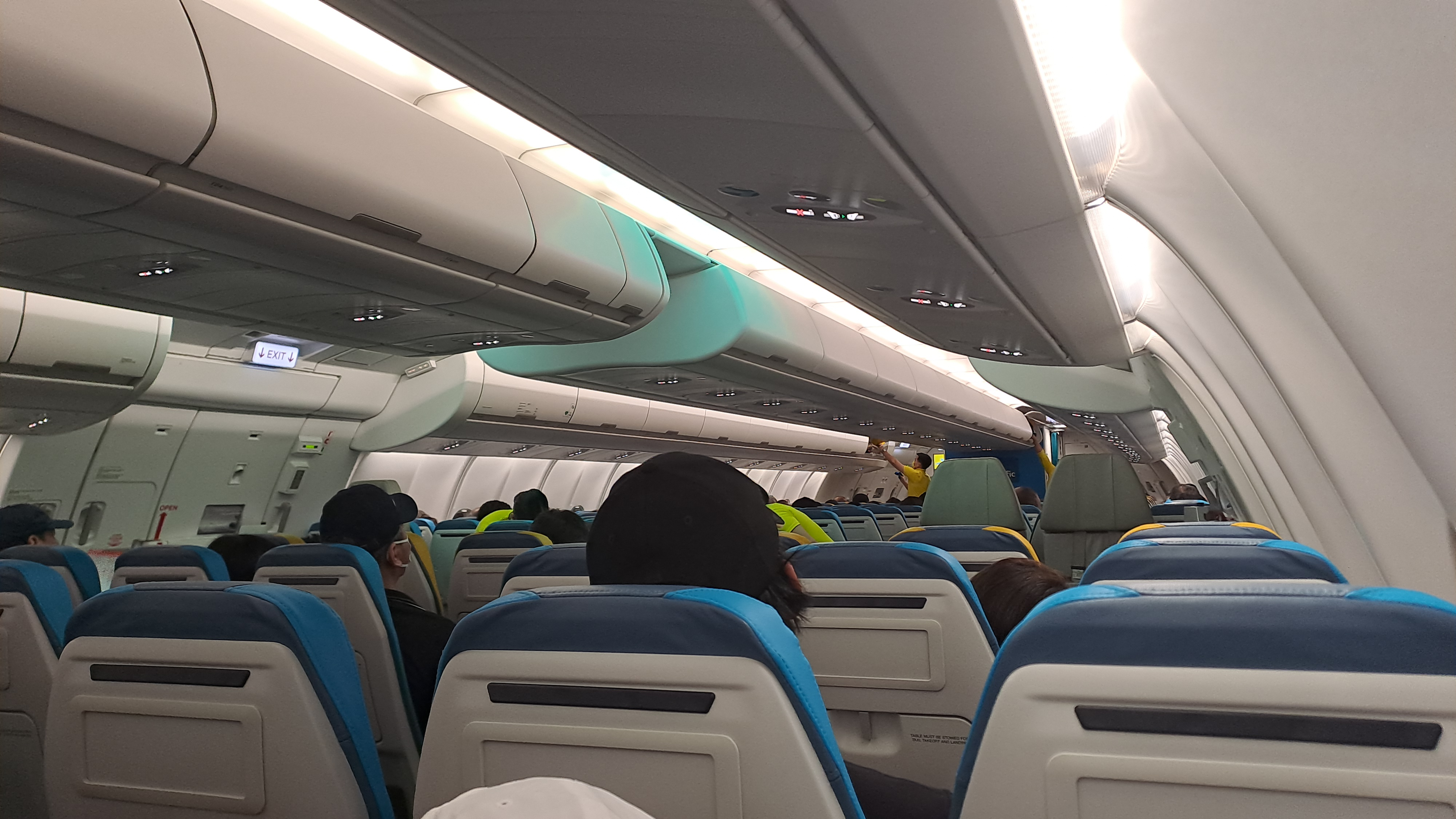
Cebu Pacific operates the densest A330-900 seating configuration, with 459 economy-only seats.

The redesigned interior, dubbed "Airspace" by Airbus and unveiled in 2016, received larger overhead bins, new ceiling panels with customisable patterns, and updated lighting. Many design elements were incorporated from the A350. A further interior update was revealed in September 2024 with availability in 2027-2028; this update features new lighting, new interior sidewalls with 5 millimetres (0.20 in) more shoulder clearance and 50 millimetres (2.0 in) more foot space at window seats, new ceiling panels, a lighter and simpler door-frame lining, electro-dimmable windows between Doors-1 and Doors-2, and an approximately 100 kilograms (220 lb) reduction in weight.

The cockpit windows feature a black "mask" outline, similar to the A350.

=== Engines ===
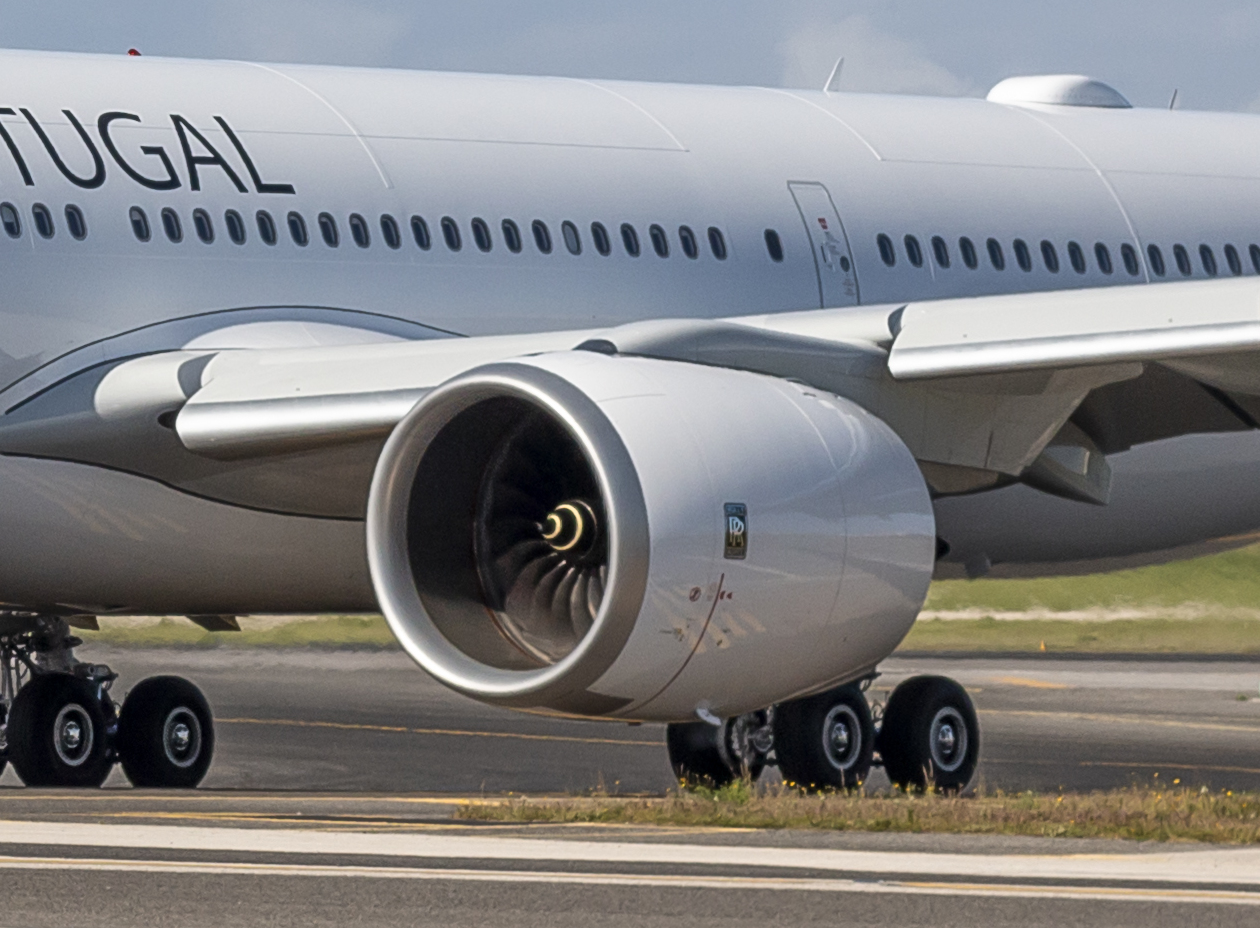
The Trent 7000 on-wing

Candidate engines included variants of Rolls-Royce's Trent 1000 and General Electric's GEnx-1B. Both engine makers were reportedly interested in winning an exclusive deal should a re-engined A330 be offered. The Trent 1000 TEN (Thrust, Efficiency, New Technology) engine was under development for the 787-10, but Rolls-Royce intended to offer a broad power range.

The A330neo uses the Rolls-Royce Trent 7000 engine, which is an electronic controlled bleed air variant of the Trent 1000 used on the Boeing 787-10. It will have a 112 in (284 cm) diameter fan and a 10:1 bypass ratio. Variants deliver thrusts of 68,000 to 72,000 pounds-force (300 to 320 kN).

The Trent is the exclusive powerplant, as Rolls-Royce offered better terms to obtain exclusivity. Customers bemoan the loss of competition among engine makers: Steven Udvar-Hazy, CEO of Air Lease Corporation, said that he wants a choice of engines, but Airbus has pointed out that equipping a commercial aircraft to handle more than one type of engine adds several hundred million dollars to the development cost. The head of Pratt and Whitney said: "Engines are no longer commodities...the optimization of the engine and the aircraft becomes more relevant."

The decision to offer the aircraft with only one engine option is not unique to Airbus; the Boeing 777X will come equipped exclusively with General Electric GE9X engines, after Rolls-Royce made a bid with its Advance configuration but was not selected.

== Variants ==
=== A330-800 ===
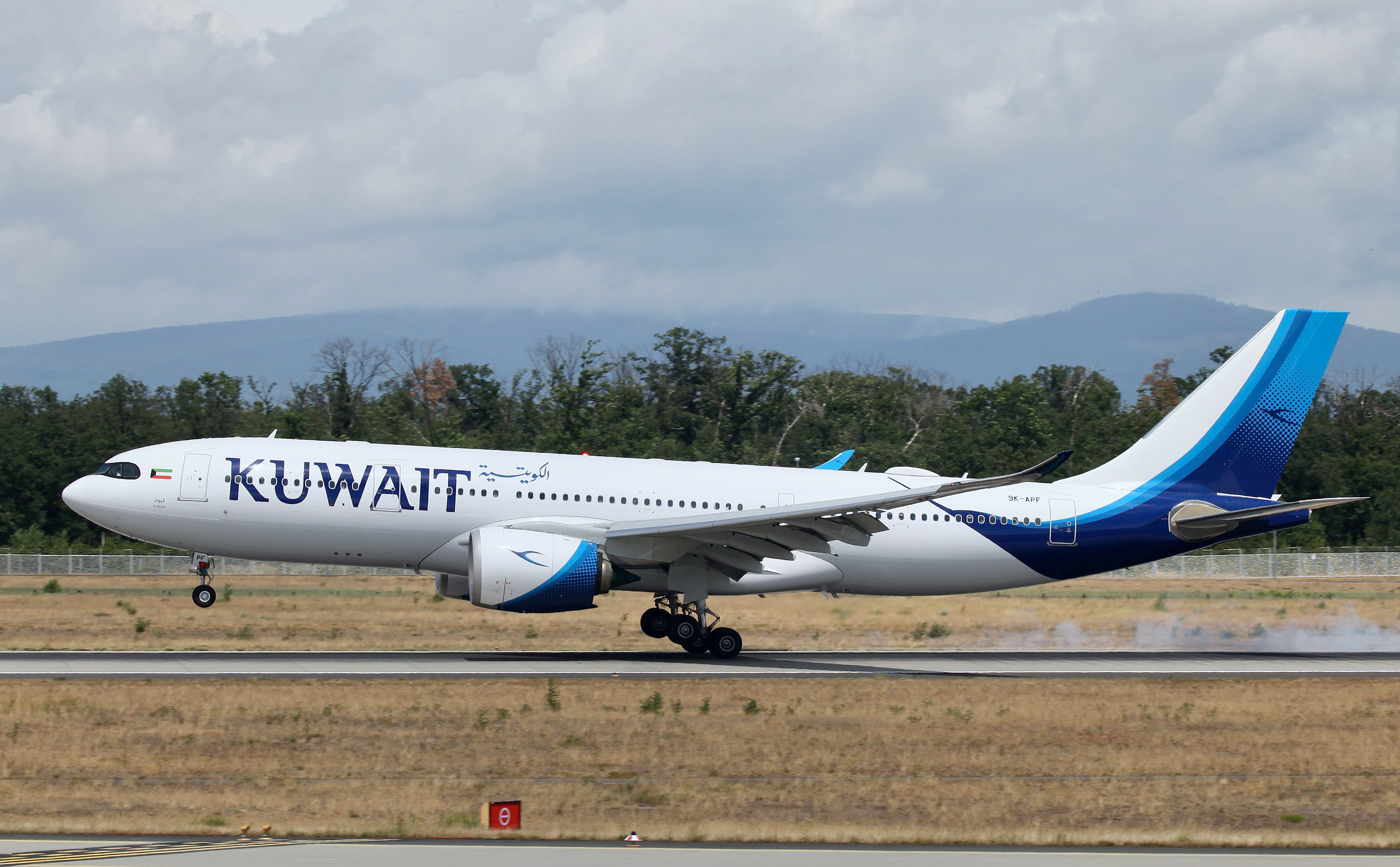
The A330-800 was introduced by Kuwait Airways on 20 November 2020.

The A330-800 retains the fuselage length of the A330-200, but can seat six more passengers (for a total of 252) with an optimised cabin featuring 18-inch-wide economy seats. The -800 has a range of 8,100 nmi (15,000 km; 9,300 mi) with 257 passengers (406 max). As the variants share 99% commonality, developing the smaller -800 has a negligible extra cost.

After the first flight of the -900 on 19 October 2017, Hawaiian Airlines (then the only customer for the -800) considered changing its order to six -800s, seeking best to fit its current network to Asia and North America whilst allowing for future growth, possibly to Europe. Demand for the -800 fell to 3%. In contrast, the -200 commanded 40% of the CEO deliveries: its range advantage has eroded with the increased capabilities of the -900, and although it offers lower fuel use per trip, fuel use per seat is higher.

As of 2017, demand for the -800 was limited by low fuel prices and the -200s it might replace after 2020 were still young (nine years on average). The Boeing 767-300s that the -800 might replace are 15 years older, and while Boeing considered relaunching production of the 767-300ER, mainly as an interim for American and United Airlines, this was complicated by a 30-year-old design including obsolete cabin amenities. At this time, Boeing intended to launch its New Midsize Airplane no earlier than 2027, affording Airbus opportunities with the 95 operators of the A330ceo. Long-haul low-cost carriers were a target for high-density nine-abreast layouts for 386 seats over 6,000–6,500 nmi (11,100–12,000 km; 6,900–7,500 mi) at the 251 t (553,000 lb) MTOW, 500 nmi (930 km; 580 mi) more than a similarly loaded 787-8 and with up to 30 more seats.

Production of the -800 beyond the prototype was in doubt, as Hawaiian was choosing between the Airbus A350-900 and the Boeing 787-8/9. In February 2018, Hawaiian was thought to be cancelling its order for six A330-800s, replacing them with Boeing 787-9s priced at less than $100–115m, close to their production cost of $80–90m, while Boeing Capital released Hawaiian from three 767-300ER leases well in advance. Hawaiian denied that the order for the A330-800 had been cancelled, but did not dismiss a new deal with Boeing. In March 2018, Hawaiian confirmed the cancellation of its order for six A330-800s and ordered ten B787-9s instead. Airbus says it was "simply undercut in price".

In July 2018, a new memorandum of understanding from Uganda Airlines for two -800s revived interest in the shorter variant. A firm order from Kuwait Airways for eight A330-800s followed in October 2018, making it the largest customer of the type; it was subsequently confirmed that Kuwait Airways would be the launch customer for the -800, with certification expected in mid-2019 and first deliveries in the first half of 2020. On 8 April 2019, Uganda National Airlines Company firmed up its order for two -800s.

Compared to the competing 787-8 with similar engines, the A330-800 has a 1% fuel-per-trip disadvantage (−5% for being heavier but +4% for the longer wingspan) but consumes 4% less fuel per seat with 13 more seats in an eight-abreast configuration, and 8% less with 27 more seats at nine-abreast with 17 in (43 cm) wide seats and aisles: the -800 is longer by 4 rows or 2.5 m (130 in).

Airbus could limit its MTOW to 200 t (440,000 lb) and derate its engines to 68,000 lbf (300,000 N) to optimise for the shorter routes to be targeted by the Boeing NMA, with the A321XLR tackling the lower end of the same niche.

The A330-800 received EASA type certification on 13 February 2020. The first aircraft, configured with 226 seats including 23 in business class, was to be delivered to Kuwait Airways in March, but the airline postponed delivery until the third quarter of 2020 amid the COVID-19 pandemic. On 29 October, the first two A330-800s were delivered to Kuwait Airways; the airline had six more -800s on order but subsequently decided to switch to the -900, becoming the first airline to operate both variants. The A330-800 then operated its first revenue flight on 20 November, flying the short distance between Kuwait and Dubai. Uganda Airlines received their first A330-800 on 21 December, with the second unit expected in January 2021.

Air Greenland took delivery of its only A330-800, named Tuukkaq, on 6 December 2022 and entered service on 19 December 2022 as a replacement for their Airbus A330-200, Norsaq.

As of March 2024, there are only seven A330-800s in revenue service with just three operators; Kuwait Airways is the largest operator with four aircraft in its fleet.

Garuda Indonesia was the fourth airline to order four A330-800s but the order was later cancelled.

A330-800 weight variants
WV	MTOW	MLW	MZFW
WV800	242 t (533,519 lb)	186 t (410,060 lb)	176 t (388,014 lb)
WV801	242 t (533,519 lb)	186 t (410,060 lb)	172 t (379,195 lb)
WV802	238 t (524,700 lb)	186 t (410,060 lb)	176 t (388,014 lb)
WV803	234 t (515,882 lb)	186 t (410,060 lb)	176 t (388,014 lb)
WV804	230 t (507,063 lb)	186 t (410,060 lb)	176 t (388,014 lb)
WV805	220 t (485,017 lb)	186 t (410,060 lb)	176 t (388,014 lb)
WV806	215 t (473,994 lb)	186 t (410,060 lb)	176 t (388,014 lb)
WV807	210 t (462,971 lb)	186 t (410,060 lb)	176 t (388,014 lb)
WV808	205 t (451,948 lb)	186 t (410,060 lb)	176 t (388,014 lb)
WV809	200 t (440,925 lb)	186 t (410,060 lb)	176 t (388,014 lb)
WV820	251 t (553,360 lb)	186 t (410,060 lb)	176 t (388,014 lb)
WV821	251 t (553,360 lb)	186 t (410,060 lb)	172 t (379,195 lb)
WV822	247 t (544,542 lb)	186 t (410,060 lb)	176 t (388,014 lb)

=== A330-900 ===
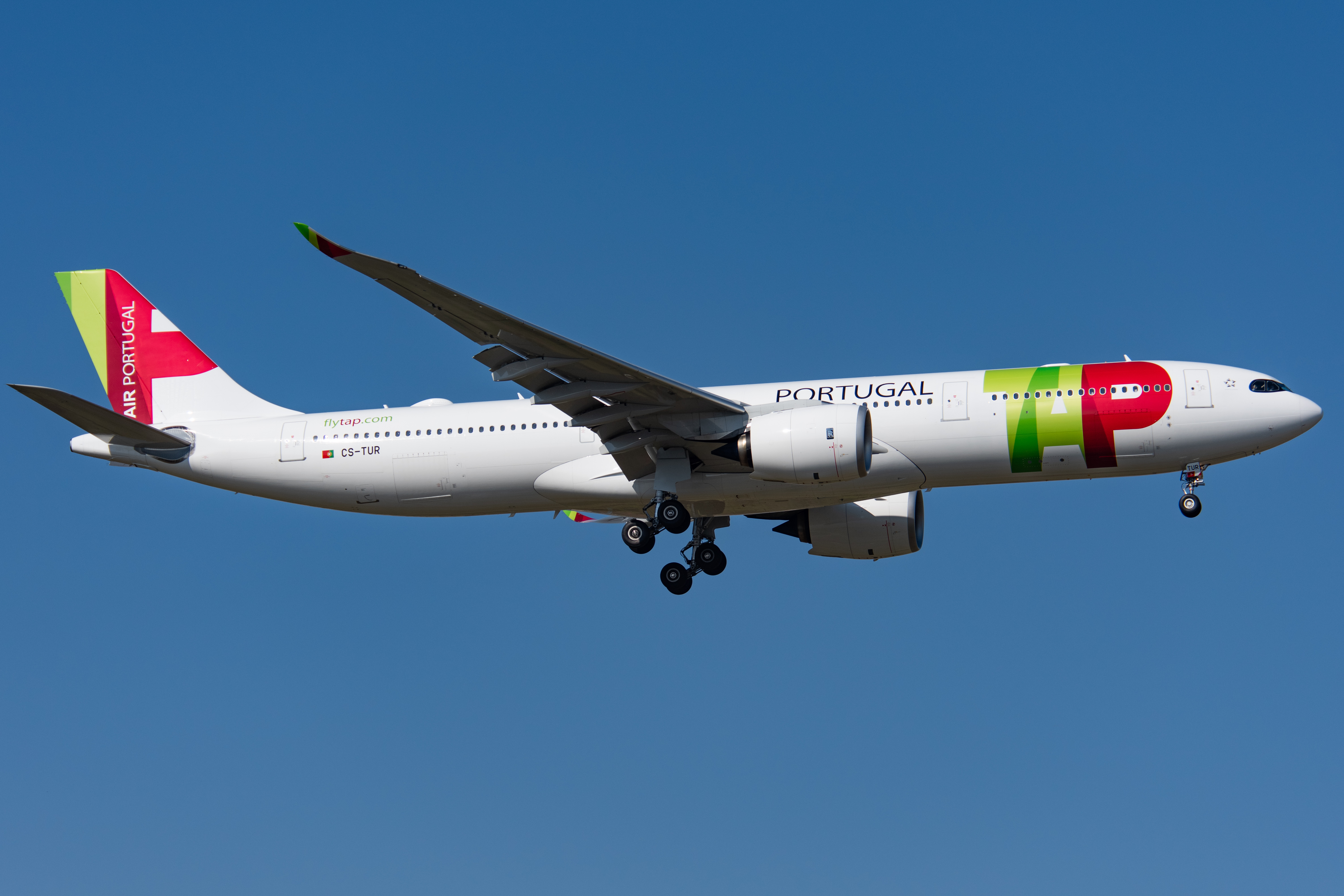
The -900 retains the A330-300 fuselage. TAP Air Portugal was the launch operator of this variant.

The A330-900 retains the fuselage length of the A330-300 and A340-300. Cabin optimisation allows ten additional seats on the A330-900 (310 passengers) with 18-inch-wide economy seats. The -900 travels 7,350 nmi (13,600 km; 8,460 mi) with 287 passengers (440 max).

Delta expects a 20 percent reduction in operating cost per seat over the Boeing 767-300ER aircraft it replaces.

Further reconfiguration of cabin facilities enables the –900 to seat up to 460 passengers in an all-economy layout. This exceeds the existing 440-seat maximum exit limit allowed by the type certificate, and requires a modification of the Type-A exit doors to meet emergency exit requirements. In November 2019, maximum accommodation increased to 460 seats, through the installation of new 'Type-A+' exits, with a dual-lane evacuation slide.

A330-900 weight variants
WV	MTOW	MLW	MZFW
WV900	242 t (533,519 lb)	191 t (421,083 lb)	181 t (399,037 lb)
WV901	242 t (533,519 lb)	191 t (421,083 lb)	175 t (385,809 lb)
WV902	238 t (524,700 lb)	191 t (421,083 lb)	181 t (399,037 lb)
WV903	234 t (515,882 lb)	191 t (421,083 lb)	181 t (399,037 lb)
WV904	230 t (507,063 lb)	191 t (421,083 lb)	181 t (399,037 lb)
WV905	220 t (485,017 lb)	191 t (421,083 lb)	181 t (399,037 lb)
WV906	215 t (473,994 lb)	191 t (421,083 lb)	181 t (399,037 lb)
WV907	210 t (462,971 lb)	191 t (421,083 lb)	181 t (399,037 lb)
WV908	205 t (451,948 lb)	191 t (421,083 lb)	181 t (399,037 lb)
WV910	245 t (540,133 lb)	191 t (421,083 lb)	181 t (399,037 lb)
WV911	245 t (540,133 lb)	191 t (421,083 lb)	181 t (399,037 lb)
WV912	241 t (531,314 lb)	191 t (421,083 lb)	181 t (399,037 lb)
WV920	251 t (553,360 lb)	191 t (421,083 lb)	181 t (399,037 lb)
WV921	251 t (553,360 lb)	191 t (421,083 lb)	175 t (385,809 lb)
WV922	247 t (544,542 lb)	191 t (421,083 lb)	181 t (399,037 lb)

=== Freighter ===
Amazon Air and UPS Airlines pushed for a freighter version, stretching the A330-900 to carry more cargo over a shorter range, but it competes with the cheaper option of converting readily available retired passenger 767 and A330 aircraft. Development costs for the proposed freighter would be lower than for a new program, as much of the engineering has already been done for the A330-200F.

=== Military ===
Airbus formally launched the tanker variant of the A330neo, dubbed as the A330 MRTT+, at the 2024 Farnborough International Airshow. The A330 MRTT+ is based on the A330-800 and is intended to replace the A330 MRTT. The A330 MRTT+ also retains the 111,000 kg (245,000 lb) fuel capacity of the A330 MRTT. Airbus plans to deliver the first A330 MRTT+ in 2029. The launch customer is expected to be the Royal Thai Air Force.

=== Corporate ===
Airbus launched the business version of the A330neo, known as the ACJ330neo. It can carry a maximum of 25 passengers and can fly up to 10,400 nautical miles in 21 hours without refueling. There are two versions of the business jet which are the ACJ330-800 and the ACJ330-900 and there are four cabin outfits.

=== Comparison of variants ===
Below is a list of major differences between the A330neo variants.

	A330-841	A330-941
3-class seating	220–260	260–300
Maximum seating	406	480
Hold	132.4 m^{3} (4,680 cu ft)	158.4 m^{3} (5,590 cu ft)
Cargo capacity	27 LD3 or 8 pallets + 3 LD3	33 LD3 or 9 pallets + 5 LD3
Length	58.36 m (191.5 ft)	63.69 m (209.0 ft)
Height	17.39 m (57.1 ft)	16.79 m (55.1 ft)
Max. payload	44 t (97,000 lb)	46 t (101,000 lb)
OEW	132 t (291,000 lb) (Note: proposed to United with 252 seats (51 first and business, 56 extra-legroom economy and 145 economy))	135–137 t (298,000–302,000 lb) (Note: proposed to United with 303 seats (57 first and business, 32 extra-legroom economy and 214 economy))
Range	8,100 nmi (15,000 km; 9,300 mi)	7,350 nmi (13,600 km; 8,460 mi)

== Operators ==
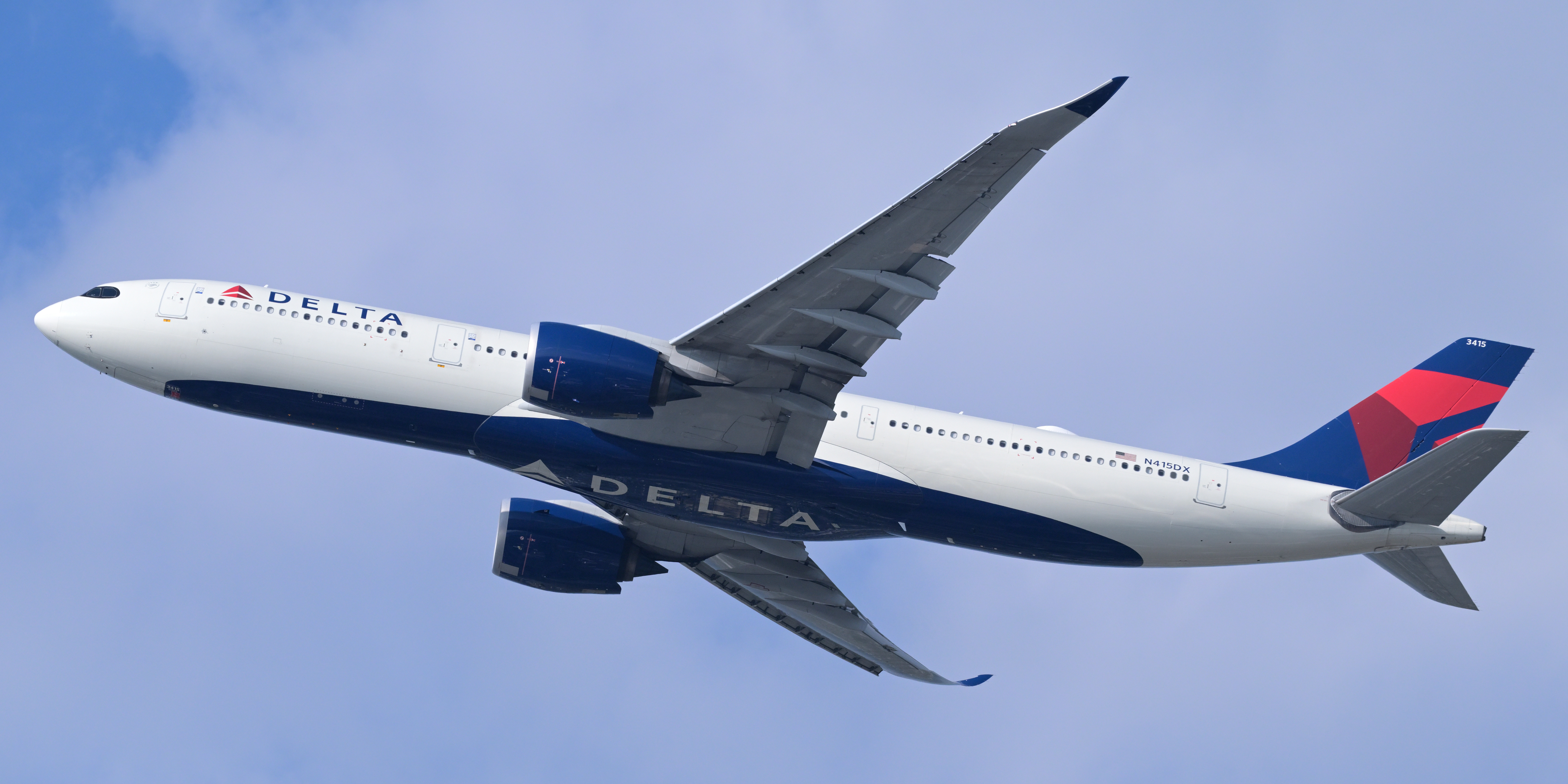
Delta Air Lines is the largest operator of the A330neo.

There are 203 aircraft in service with 25 operators as of October 2026. The five largest operators of A330neo are Delta Air Lines (39), TAP Air Portugal (19), Condor (18), ITA Airways (17) and Cebu Pacific (15).

On 11 April 2023, Airbus delivered the 100th A330neo, an A330-900, to German airline Condor Flugdienst GmbH, which would lease it from AerCap. At that time, the A330neo Family flew in the liveries of 22 airlines on over 200 routes and destinations worldwide.

=== List of operators ===
Operator	Introduction into service	-800	-900	A330neo
Air Algérie	15 November 2025	—	6	6
Air Côte d'Ivoire	15 October 2025	—	2	2
Air Greenland	19 December 2022	1	—	1
Air Mauritius	18 April 2019	—	2	2
Air Senegal	8 March 2019	—	2	2
Aircalin	30 July 2019	—	2	2
Avianca	TBA	—	1	1
Azul Brazilian Airlines	13 May 2019	—	1	1
Cebu Pacific	15 December 2021	—	15	15
Condor	27 December 2022	—	18	18
Corsair International	31 March 2021	—	9	9
Delta Air Lines	24 May 2019	—	39	39
Garuda Indonesia	18 November 2019	—	5	5
Hainan Airlines	16 November 2025	—	2	2
Iberojet	7 August 2020	—	2	2
ITA Airways	7 June 2023	—	17	17
Kuwait Airways	29 October 2020	4	6	10
Lion Air	19 July 2019	—	8	8
Malaysia Airlines	19 December 2024	—	10	10
Starlux Airlines	1 June 2022	—	10	10
Sunclass Airlines	12 December 2022	—	3	3
TAP Air Portugal	26 November 2018	—	19	19
Uganda Airlines	21 December 2020	2	—	2
Virgin Atlantic	27 October 2022	—	9	9
Private Customer		1	1	2
Undisclosed		—	6	6
Total		8	195	203

=== Orders and deliveries ===
Orders and deliveries by type and year

Orders and deliveries by type (summary)
Type	Orders	Deliveries	Backlog
A330-800	13	8	5
A330-900	546	195	351
A330neo family	559	203	356

Orders and deliveries by year (distributive)
		2014	2015	2016	2017	2018	2019	2020	2021	2022	2023	2024	2025	2026	Total
Orders	A330-800	10	—	—	−4	2	6	1	—	−4	1	—	—	1	13
Orders	A330-900	110	52	42	10	16	93	−7	22	−61	7	78	98	86	546
Orders	A330neo family	120	52	42	6	18	99	−6	22	−65	8	78	98	87	559
Deliveries	A330-800	—	—	—	—	—	—	3	1	1	2	—	1	—	8
Deliveries	A330-900	—	—	—	—	3	41	10	13	22	27	30	33	16	195
Deliveries	A330neo family	—	—	—	—	3	41	13	14	23	29	30	34	16	203

A330neo family orders and deliveries by year (cumulative)

Orders Deliveries — as of October 2026

Orders and deliveries by customer

A330neo family orders and deliveries by customer
Initial date	Customer	Orders			Deliveries		
Initial date	Customer	-800	-900	Total	-800	-900	Total
17 Jul 2014	MG Aviation	—	2	2	—	2	2
21 Nov 2014	Delta Air Lines (Note: Launch customer of A330-900 variant)	—	53	53	—	37	37
30 Nov 2014	CIT Leasing	—	70	70	—	27	27
23 Dec 2014	Avolon	—	44	44	—	9	9
9 Mar 2015	Sumisho Air Lease	—	30	30	—	30	30
13 Nov 2015	TAP Air Portugal (Note: Launch operator of A330-900 variant)	—	12	12	—	10	10
28 Jan 2016	Garuda Indonesia	4 (Note: Order has not been officially cancelled according to Airbus O&D.)	12	16	—	3	3
5 Sep 2017	Aircalin	—	2	2	—	2	2
15 Dec 2017	BOC Aviation	—	6	6	—	6	6
19 Dec 2017	Air Senegal	—	2	2	—	2	2
15 Oct 2018	Kuwait Airways (Note: Launch customer of A330-800 variant)	4	7	11	4	6	10
12 Dec 2018	Middle East Airlines	—	4	4	—	—	—
5 Apr 2019	Uganda Airlines	2	—	2	2	—	2
1 Jul 2019	Virgin Atlantic	—	11	11	—	1	1
19 Jul 2019	Lion Air Group	—	2	2	—	2	2
5 Nov 2019	Cebu Pacific	—	16	16	—	15	15
22 Nov 2019	National Aviation Services (NAS)	—	12	12	—	12	12
23 Dec 2019	Hainan Airlines	—	2	2	—	2	2
18 Dec 2020	Air Greenland	1	—	1	1	—	1
3 Aug 2021	Condor	—	14	14	—	7	7
1 Dec 2021	ITA Airways	—	10	10	—	10	10
20 Sep 2022	Air Côte d'Ivoire	—	2	2	—	2	2
4 Nov 2022	Azul	—	7	7	—	1	1
20 Apr 2023	Governments; Executive And Private Jets	2	—	2	1	—	1
1 Jun 2023	Air Algérie	—	10	10	—	6	6
21 Feb 2024	Starlux Airlines	—	3	3	—	2	2
22 Feb 2024	VietJet Air	—	40	40	—	—	—
25 Jul 2024	Flynas	—	20	20	—	—	—
7 Aug 2024	Cathay Pacific	—	30	30	—	—	—
8 Jan 2025	Saudia	—	10	10	—	—	—
19 Jun 2025	International Airlines Group (IAG)	—	21	21	—	—	—
30 Jun 2025	MAB Leasing	—	20	20	—	—	—
12 Nov 2025	Etihad Airways	—	6	6	—	—	—
30 Jun 2026	Scandinavian Airlines (SAS)	—	18	18	—	—	—
23 Jul 2026	China Eastern Airlines	—	25	25	—	—	—
Unknown	SMBC Aviation Capital	—	1	1	—	1	1
Undisclosed		—	22	22	—	—	—
Total		13	556	559	8	195	203

Orders and deliveries graph

as of October 2026

=== Market ===
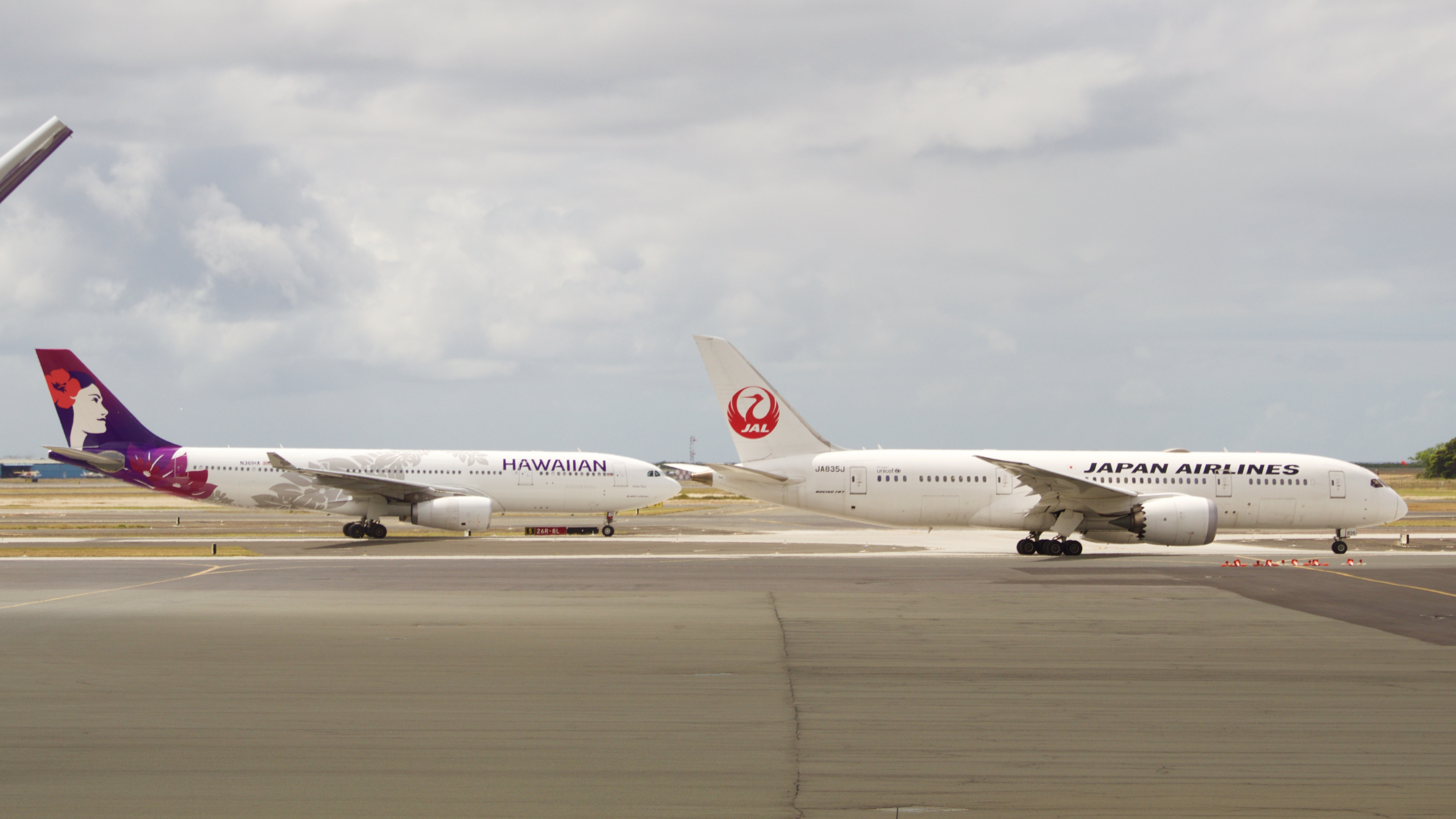
A Japan Airlines 787-8 alongside a Hawaiian A330-200 in Honolulu.

Third party analysis for a 3,350 nmi (6,200 km; 3,860 mi) transatlantic flight shows that the 787-9 has a slight advantage over the A330-900 in cash cost per available seat miles, while the Airbus outperforms the Boeing once capital costs are included, based on the A330-900 cost an estimated $10.6m less. They have close economics but the A330neo costs up to $30m less, according to another publication. An A330-900 is worth $115 million in 2018, while a new B787-9 valuation is $145 million, up from $135 million in 2014, but it may have been sold for $110–$115 million to prevent A330neo sales.

Between the 2004 launch of the Dreamliner and the A330neo launch in 2014, the market was split almost equally between both, with between 900 and 920 A330ceos sold against 950 to 1,000 787-8/9s. Between 2014 and the neo first flight in October 2017, the A330/A330neo had 440 orders (excluding freighters) compared to 272 for the 787-8/9 (excluding the -10), or since the 787 launch, 1211 A330ceo/neos compared to 1106 787-8/9s. Teal Group's Richard Aboulafia believes that the A330neo should dominate the lower range and lower capacity end of the twin aisle market because the 787-8 has the high operating economics and unit price associated with its 8,000-nm range.

Flightglobal Ascend Consultancy forecast 600 deliveries including 10% of -800 variants, less optimistic than Airbus's 1,000. At entry into service in 2018, sales were disappointing and A330 production was to be cut to 50 in 2019 down from 67 in 2017: while it was the widebody with the largest operator base with 1,390 deliveries since 1993, the fleet was still very young with only 46 aircraft retired. Airbus believed A330 operators would start fleet renewal beginning in 2020. With the exception of Delta, industry-leading airlines preferred the Boeing 787.

Between January 2014 and November 2019, the A330/A330neo had 477 net orders (net of cancellations) compared to a total of 407 for all three variants of the 787. The A330neo program was the best-selling Airbus widebody over the same period. Airbus believes there is potential for the A330neo in the growing long-haul, low-cost carrier sector. While Airbus expected a market for over 1,000 A330neos, one pessimistic forecast reported in 2018 came in as low as 400 sales, in that the A330neo was late to the market and fuel prices had declined markedly over the years, reducing demand. As of June 2018, 19% of A330 operators also operate the Boeing 787. Leeham News argued that the A330-800 does not fully cover the upper end of Boeing's studied New Midsize Airplane market, while also describing the A330-800 as a cost-effective entry for Airbus into the upper end of the middle of the market. In May 2019, Airbus's chief commercial officer made clear the company has a “rock”, the A321neo, and a “hard place”, the A330-800, for any airframer intending to bring a new airplane into the middle of the market at a time when Boeing was mired in the 737 MAX crisis.

Compared to a 283-seat, 9-abreast 787-9, Airbus claims a 1% lower fuel burn for the -900: 3% higher due to the 4–5 t (8,800–11,000 lb) higher OEW, but 4% lower due to the 4 m (13 ft) wider wingspan, and 3% lower fuel burn per seat in a 287-seat, 8-abreast configuration, reaching 7% with a 303-seat, 9-abreast layout.

== Specifications (A330-941) ==
Data from

General characteristics

- Crew: 2
- Capacity: 480 passengers and either 33 LD3s or 9 pallets and 5 LD3s
- Length: 63.69 m (208 ft 10 in)
- Wingspan: 64 m (210 ft 0 in)
- Width: 5.64 m (18 ft 6 in)
- Height: 16.79 m (55 ft 1 in)
- Empty weight: 137,000 kg (302,033 lb)
- Max takeoff weight: 251,000 kg (553,400 lb)
- Fuel capacity: 139,090 L (36,750 US gal)
- Powerplant: 2 × Rolls-Royce Trent 7000-72 turbofan engines, 323.98 kN (72,834 lbf) thrust each

Performance

- Maximum speed: Mach 0.86
- Range: 13,334 km (8,285 mi, 7,200 nmi)
- Service ceiling: 12,634 m (41,450 ft)

== See also ==
- Competition between Airbus and Boeing

Related development

- Airbus A330
- Airbus A350

Aircraft of comparable role, configuration, and era

- Boeing 787 Dreamliner
- Comac C929
