= Uganda Airlines =

Flag carrier of Uganda

Coordinates: 00°02′40″N 32°26′33″E

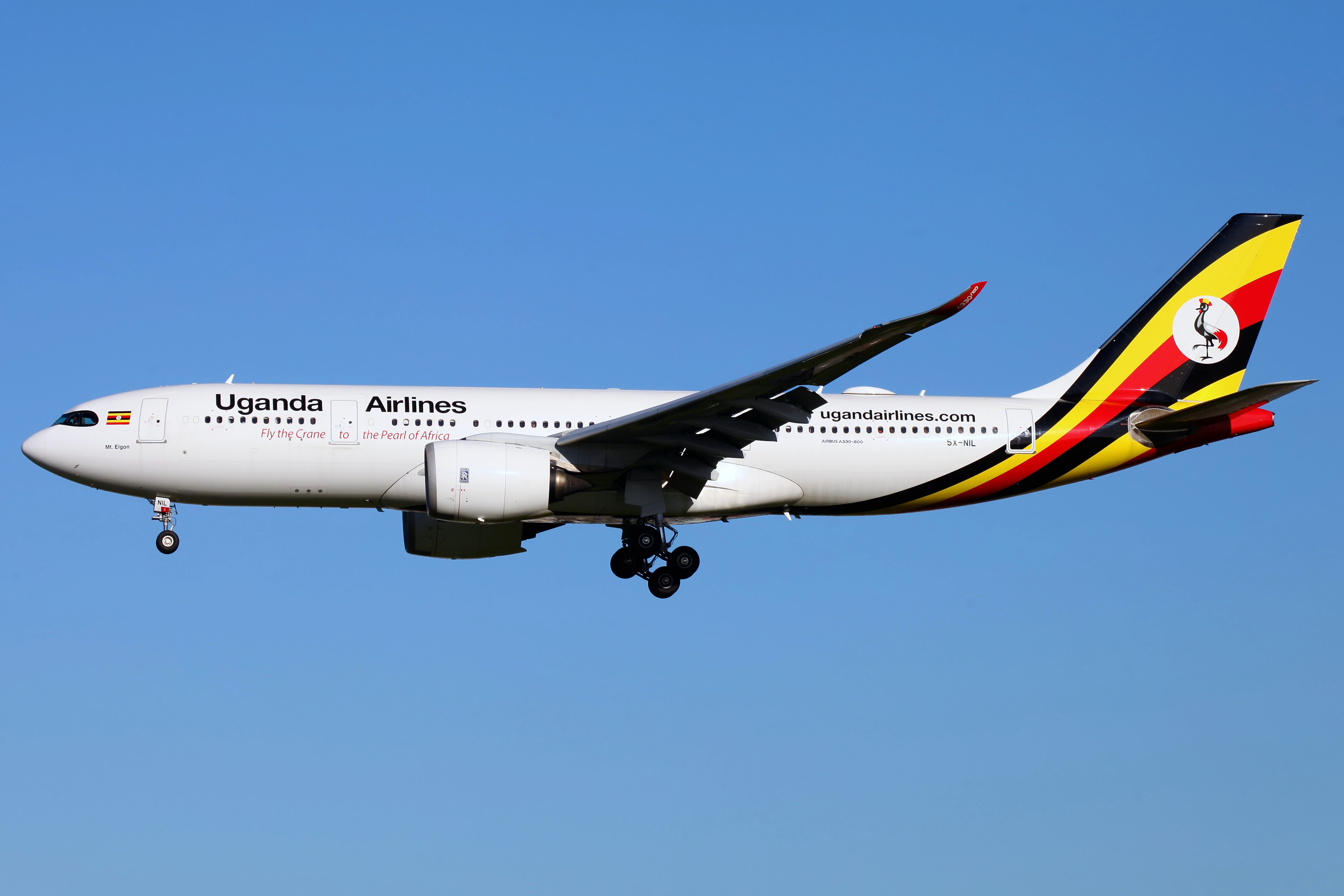
- Uganda Airlines Airbus A330-800
| IATA | ICAO | Call sign |
|---|---|---|
| UR | UGD | CRESTED |
- Founded: 30 January 2018; 8 years ago
- Commenced operations: 28 August 2019; 7 years ago
- Hubs: Entebbe International Airport
- Frequent-flyer program: Craneflyer
- Fleet size: 6
- Destinations: 18
- Parent company: Government of Uganda
- Headquarters: Entebbe, Wakiso District, Uganda
- Key people: Priscilla Mirembe Serukka (chairperson); Girma Wake (Chief executive officer); Shakila Rahim Lamar (Acting CCO)
- Employees: 517 (2024)
- Website: www.ugandairlines.com

Uganda Airlines, legally Uganda National Airlines Company, is the flag carrier of Uganda. The company is a revival of the older Uganda Airlines which operated from 1977 until 2001. The current carrier began flying in August 2019.

== Location ==
The company headquarters are located at Entebbe International Airport, in Wakiso District, approximately 34 kilometres (21 mi) south of the central business district of Kampala, the capital and largest city in Uganda.

== History ==
Following studies and wide consultations, the Cabinet of Uganda opted to re-launch Uganda Airlines, with six new jets, two of which are the wide-body, long-range A330-800 and the other four being CRJ900 aircraft. The studies recommended an equity investment by the government of approximately US$70 million and loans totaling US$330 million, borrowed from regional lenders, such as the Trade and Development Bank, to complete the purchase.

In May 2018, The EastAfrican reported that the Ugandan government had made a small monetary deposit on each of the six aircraft, while it concluded final financing arrangements. The first batch of CRJ900 aircraft was expected in November 2018, while the delivery of the A330-800 planes was expected in December 2020.

As of 19 March 2019, according to Ephraim Bagenda, the company's chief executive at the time, 12 pilots and 12 co-pilots (total of 24 cockpit crew), all of them Ugandans, had completed their training and certification on the CRJ900-ER aircraft. The first two regional jets were expected in Uganda in April 2019. The third jet was scheduled for delivery in July 2019 and the fourth CRJ900 was expected in September 2019. Between April and June 2019, the airline planned to obtain an Air operator's certificate (AOC) from the Uganda Civil Aviation Authority and start operations by 30 June 2019. On 8 April 2019, the expected delivery date for the first two jets (5X-EQU and 5X-KOB) was reported as Tuesday 23 April 2019.

In April 2019, the delivery of the first Bombardier CRJ900 was confirmed as 23 April 2019 and that of the first Airbus A330-800 as the first half of 2021.

On 27 July 2019, the Uganda Civil Aviation Authority awarded Uganda National Airlines Company with an Air Operator Certificate, finalizing a five-step, three-month certification process that cleared the airline to commence commercial operations. On 2 August 2019, the airline announced the launch date as the 28th of the same month, with flights to Nairobi, Mogadishu, Dar es Salaam, Juba, Kilimanjaro, Mombasa and Bujumbura.

On the morning of 28 August 2019, Uganda Airlines had its first commercial flight from Entebbe to Jomo Kenyatta International Airport (JKIA) with eight passengers on board.

On 13 November 2019, Uganda Airlines launched the first flight to Kilimanjaro International Airport; thereby completing the first phase of operations to seven routes which was started with flights to Jomo Kenyatta International Airport nearly three months earlier.

On 16 December 2019, Uganda Airlines commenced regular commercial passenger service to Zanzibar in Tanzania. The three-times-weekly service, brought the airline's destinations to eight in the second phase of route expansion.

On 1 October 2020, after a six-months pause in scheduled passenger service, due to travel restrictions imposed as a result of the COVID-19 pandemic, Uganda Airlines resumed scheduled passenger service, in a phased manner. On that day, the airline's hub, Entebbe International Airport that had been closed to passenger traffic since March 2020, was opened for resumed passenger service.

On 18 December 2020, Uganda Airlines launched commercial flights to Kinshasa in the Democratic Republic of the Congo. The three times weekly operation increased the airline's expanding network to ten destinations.

In August 2023, UR announced plans to begin scheduled passenger and cargo service to Lagos, Nigeria and Mumbai, India, during Q4 2023. If and when new equipment is acquired as anticipated, destinations on the radar include Lusaka, Harare, Cape Town, Abuja, Jeddah, London and Guangzhou. Others include Addis Ababa and Amsterdam. Also under consideration is Goma, DRC.

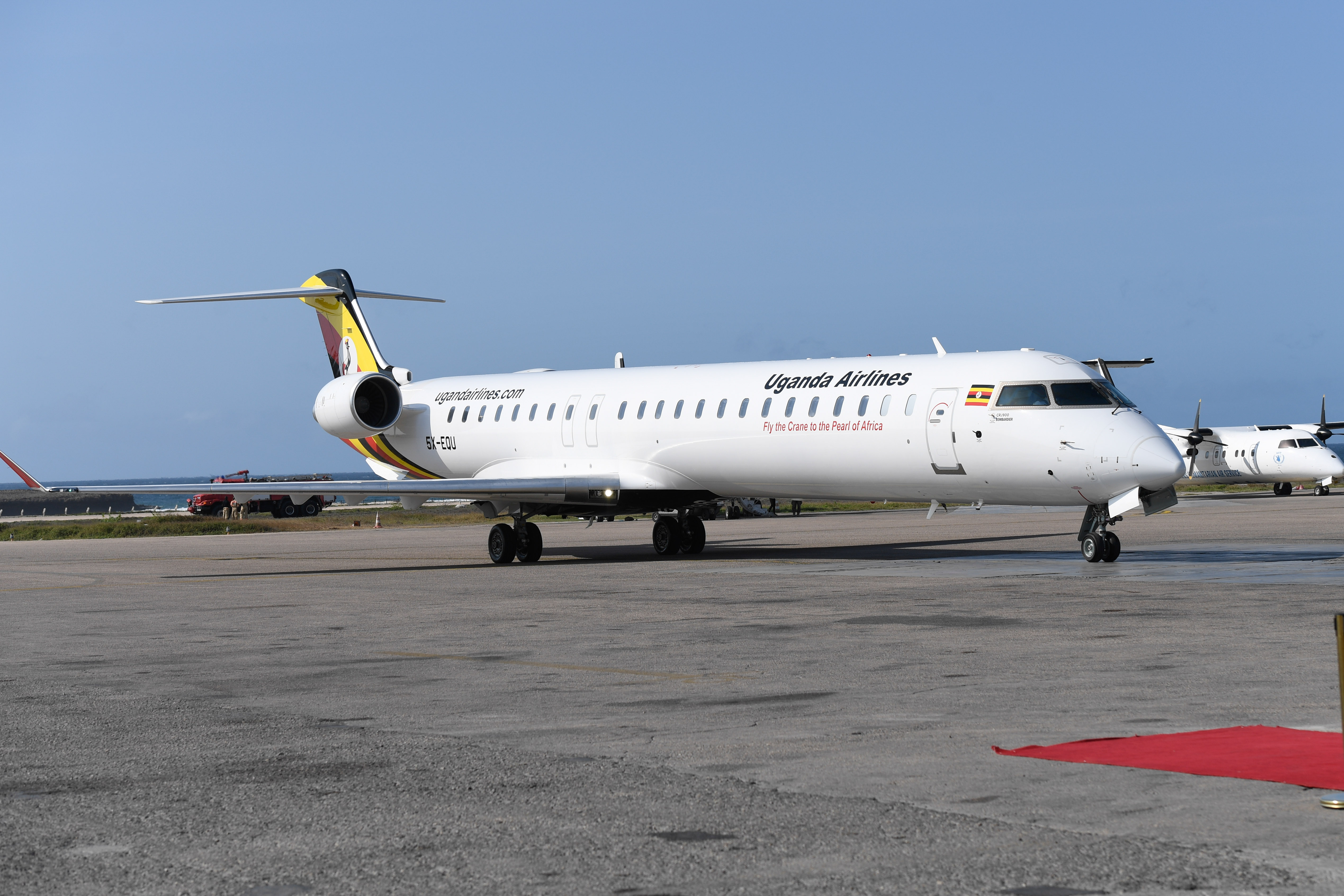
Uganda Airlines, 5X-EQU, Bombardier CRJ-900

In April 2024, UR received regulatory approval to service Lusaka, Harare, Jeddah and Riyadh. Service to Cape Town via Harare is also under consideration. Also in April 2024, UR began to make concrete arrangements to service Abu Dhabi.

In March 2025, the airline announced service to London Gatwick to commence in May 2025. On 18 May 2025 UR began direct passenger and cargo service between Entebbe and London Gatwick, four times weekly.

In August 2026 the airline announced that it would add passenger and cargo service to Accra, Ghana on 27 October 2026 and to Kigali, Rwanda on 18 November 2026.

== Fleet ==
As of November 2026, Uganda Airlines operates the following aircraft:

Uganda Airlines passenger fleet
| Aircraft | In fleet | Orders | Passengers | | | | Notes |
| Aircraft | In fleet | Orders | C | P | Y | Total | Notes |
|---|---|---|---|---|---|---|---|
| Airbus A330-800 | 2 | — | 20 | 28 | 210 | 258 | |
| Boeing 737 MAX 8 | — | 4 | TBA | | | | |
| Boeing 787-9 | — | 4 | TBA | | | | |
| Bombardier CRJ-900ER | 4 | — | 12 | — | 64 | 76 | |
Uganda Airlines Cargo fleet
| Boeing 737-800BCF | — | 1 | Cargo | | | | |
| Boeing 767-300BCF | — | 1 | Cargo | | | | |
| Total | 6 | 10 | | | | | |

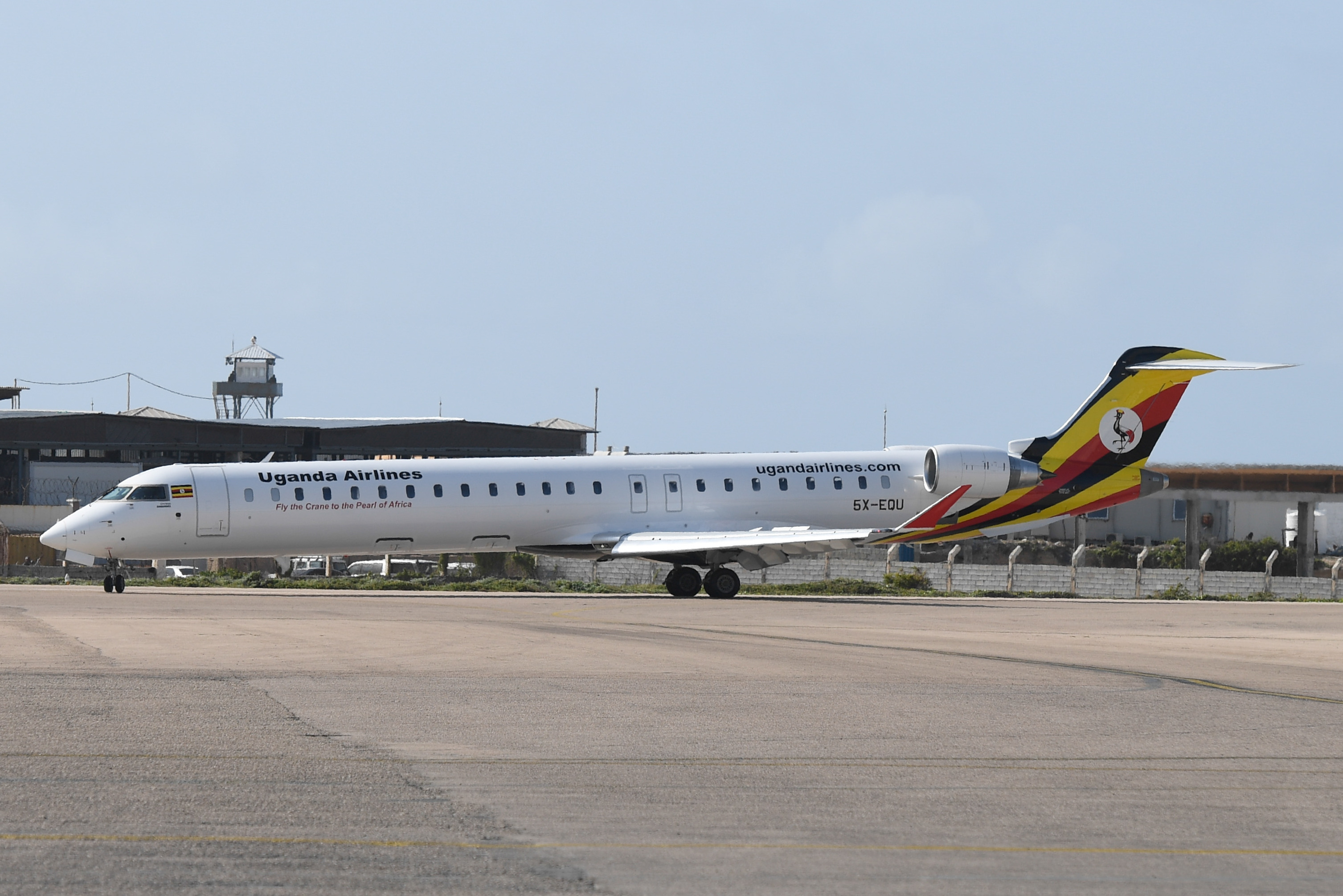
Uganda Airlines 5X-EQU, Bombardier CRJ-900

== Pilots ==
As of February 2021, Uganda Airlines employed around 50 pilots, when the fleet consisted of four CRJ900s and two A330-800neos. In June 2026, the airline placed a fresh order of ten Boeing jets (four Boeing 737 MAX, four Boeing 787-9s, one Boeing 767-300BCF and one Boeing 737-800BCF. Following that, the airline began recruiting an estimated 80 new cockpit crew to prepare for the arrival of the new planes.

== Interline agreements ==
Effective March 2021, Uganda Airlines maintains an interline agreement with Emirates. In August 2021, The Citizen newspaper reported that the airline had signed interline agreements with Emirates, Qatar Airways, Hahn Air and APG Airlines of France. At that time UR was negotiating interline agreements with Air Tanzania and Precision Air. As of July 2024, UR was negotiating an interline agreement with South African Airways. In September 2025, UR entered an interline partnership with Air India.

== Associations and memberships ==
In September 2019, Uganda National Airlines Company Limited was admitted as a member of the African Airlines Association (AFRAA).

In February 2021, Uganda Airlines signed an agreement with Rolls-Royce Limited, the manufacturer of the airline's A330-800 engines, assigning the maintenance of the engines to Rolls-Royce, under their TotalCare program. The airline will be charged an hourly fee for every one hour of flight, for every Rolls-Royce Trent 7000 engine in the fleet.

In November 2021, the airline signed a Flight Hour Services (FHS) agreement with Airbus, for after-sales support and training. The agreement includes "on-site engineering, repairs, and timely spare parts availability", for the next five years.

In January 2022, the airline began the process of obtaining IATA Operational Safety Audit (IOSA) certification, with expected conclusion in the fourth quarter of 2022. During September 2023, Uganda Airlines together with Entebbe International Airport and the Uganda Civil Aviation Authority underwent the ICAO Oversight Safety Audit.

== Corporate overview ==
=== Ownership ===
The airline is jointly owned by two Ugandan Cabinet Ministries; the Ministry of Finance, Planning and Economic Development and the Ministry of Works and Transport, on a 50/50 basis.

=== Governance ===
The airline was governed by a seven-person board of directors, including the following:

- Godfrey Perez Ahabwe (economist): chairperson
- Benon Kajuna (Transport economist): representing the Uganda Ministry of Works and Transport
- Godfrey Ssemugooma: representing the Uganda Ministry of Finance, Planning and Economic Development
- Catherine Asinde Poran: independent, non-executive director
- Rehema Mutazindwa: independent, non-executive director
- Charles Hamya: independent, non-executive director
- Stephen Aziku Zua: independent, non-executive director

On 30 April 2021, the entire board of directors was suspended by the Minister of Transport and Works, Katumba Wamala, due to allegations of corruption, mismanagement and poor performance.

In January 2022, the New Vision newspaper reported that the suspended board members had been asked to resign, so that their terminal benefits could be processed. According to the newspaper, each board member would receive USh30 million (approx. US$8,640) in a lump sum and a monthly payment of USh5 million (approx. US$1,440), for six months thereafter.

In March 2022, a new seven-person board of directors was appointed to replace the first board whose members had resigned at the request of the shareholders. The new board members are:

- Priscilla Mirembe Serukka (chairperson)
- Ebrahim Kisoro Sadrudin
- Herbert Kamuntu
- Abdi Karim Moding
- Barbara Mirembe Namugambe
- Samson Rwahwire
- Patrick Ocailap.

=== Self ground handling ===
In July 2022, the ground handling contract that the airline had with DAS Handling Limited at its base at Entebbe Airport expired. New ground handling equipment was procured and 160 new staff were hired to start the self handling process. The contract with Das Handling was extended through August and September 2022. Das Handling trained the new staff on handling the new equipment and on how to run the ground handling business. The airline was expected to start self ground handling in October 2022. This was expected to save the airline US$250,000 per month in fees.

Uganda Airlines Handling Services began independent self ground handling in November 2022. The airline unit employs in excess of 200 people, using equipment valued at over US$3 million.

=== Aircraft maintenance ===
In March 2024, the Uganda Civil Aviation Authority awarded UR a one-year Approved Maintenance Organisation (AMO) certificate. "Uganda Airlines is authorised to carry out Class 5 aircraft, engine and component maintenance activities. The carrier is also rated for level 6 maintenance for large aircraft, turbine engines and accessories, covering its A330 and CRJ fleets".

=== Training ===
On 10 June 2022, training was provided to 21 Uganda Airlines staff on the RVSM Continued Airworthiness & Maintenance Requirements. The course occurred via webinar and was conducted by Aleksandr Rudnev, an instructor from Sofema Aviation Services, based in Sofia, Bulgaria.

=== Business trends ===
Uganda Airlines has made losses every year since its inception. The carrier has incurred losses of over 1 trillion USh (US$300m) in just five years since its inception.

As a state owned parastatal organisation, detailed audit reports are published annually by the Office of the Auditor General and are featured in media reports. As of January 2025, the airline had reduced its financial losses by 26 percent over the previous 12 months, compared to the one year before that. Nonetheless, in 2025 the Office of the Auditor General said that the company "could have challenges of meeting and paying its short term financial obligations".

| | 2019–20 | 2020–21 | 2021–22 | 2022–23 | 2023–24 |
|---|---|---|---|---|---|
| Revenue (USh bn) | | 46.9 | 141 | 230.4 | 369.7 |
| Revenue (US$ m) | | 12.81 | 38.54 | 62.98 | 101.05 |
| Net profit (USh bn) | 102.4 | 164.5 | 266.0 | 324.9 | 237.8 |
| Net profit (US$ m) | 27.99 | 44.96 | 72.71 | 88.81 | 65.01 |
| Number of aircraft (at year end) | 4 | 4 | 6 | 6 | 6 |

== Awards and recognition ==
In March 2021, Uganda Airlines was awarded the World's Youngest Aircraft Fleet Award, given by Ch-Aviation, an industry information collector and publisher based in the city of Chur, in Switzerland. The publication cited the average age of the aircraft in the Uganda Airlines fleet at 1.15 years as of March 2021. In January 2022, Uganda Airlines again topped the list of the youngest fleet among the world's airlines. Its six aircraft averaged 2.06 years, as of January 2022. In January 2023, the age of its aircraft averaged slightly over three years, making UR the youngest fleet in Africa, for three years in a row (2021–2023). In 2023, the fleet averaged 3.01 years. The airline once again won the "Youngest Fleet in Africa" award in 2024.

== See also ==
- Uganda Airlines (1976–2001)
- Entebbe International Airport
- Civil Aviation Authority of Uganda
