= Kwatsi Alibaruho =

American engineer

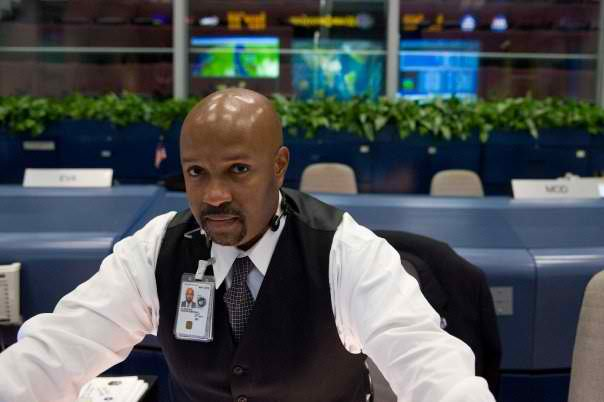
- Kwatsi Alibaruho in MCC During STS-126
- Born: May 6, 1972 (age 54); Maywood, Illinois
- Education: BS, Avionics, Massachusetts Institute of Technology; MBA, Rice University
- Occupation: Engineer
- Employer: NASA
- Known for: flight director
- Title: Flight Director

Kwatsi Alibaruho (born May 6, 1972) is a Flight Director for the National Aeronautics and Space Administration. He is a mukiga and the first black NASA Flight Director.

== Background ==
Alibaruho was born to the late Dr. George Alibaruho of Uganda, and Dr. Gloria Alibaruho of Macon, Georgia. His mother is a retired university professor of social sciences, and his father is a retired economist. From his early beginnings, Alibaruho's parents encouraged his interest in mathematics and science by exposing him to printed material about rockets and about NASA as well as by exposing him to science fiction media of the time. Kwatsi is married to Macresia Alibaruho with two children.

"I caught the science bug very early from watching science fiction programs, and I wanted to learn about real science," Alibaruho has said. Every chance he had, he signed up for extracurricular activities and seminars where he dedicated weekends and summers to further his knowledge of science and engineering.

== Education ==
Alibaruho earned a Bachelor of Science in Avionics in 1994 from the Department of Aeronautics and Astronautics at the Massachusetts Institute of Technology. In May 2011, he earned a Master of Business Administration from Rice University through Rice's Executive MBA Program, which he attended full-time while concurrently performing his duties as Flight Director. Mr. Alibaruho is also a PMP (Program Management Professional).

== Early NASA career ==
Alibaruho started with NASA in 1993 as a Cooperative Education student serving in the Mission Operations Directorate's ISS Life Support Systems Group. Post-graduation, he serviced as an ISS Life Support Systems Flight Controller (MCC Call Sign: ECLSS) from 1995 to 2000. During that time, Alibaruho became one of the first ECLSS officers qualified for duty in the new International Space Station Program and served on missions ISS-1A/R, STS-88/ISS-2A, STS-101/ISS-2A.2a, STS-106/ISS-2A.2b, STS-97/ISS-4A, STS-105/ISS-5A.1.

In May 2001, Alibaruho was selected as the Manager of the ISS Life Support Systems Group where he managed and trained a team of approximately 25 Flight Controllers. He served in this capacity for just over three years until he was selected as a Flight Director in February 2005.

As of November 2005, only 58 people had directed human spaceflight missions. The Flight Director class of 2005, of which Alibaruho is a member, is the second largest ever appointed and the most diverse. The nine-member group also included three women and two Hispanics. Leading a team of flight controllers, support personnel and engineering experts, a flight director has the overall responsibility to manage and carry out Space Shuttle flights and International Space Station expeditions. A flight director also leads and orchestrates planning and integration activities with flight controllers, payload customers, space station partners and others.

== Flight Director career ==
By August 2005, Alibaruho had completed more than 700 hours of training as an International Space Station Flight Director and reported for active duty in Mission Control immediately following completion of NASA's "Return-to-flight" mission, STS-114 / LF-1, a flight led by his longtime mentors Paul Hill and Mark Ferring.

Shortly after, Alibaruho completed training as a Space Shuttle Flight Director, now qualified to manage operations on both spacecraft. During his Flight Director career, Alibaruho served as an Orbit ISS Flight Director for Assembly Missions STS-115 / ISS-12A and STS-123/ISS-1J/A. He served as an Orbit ISS Flight Director for Expeditions 11 – 28, logging literally hundreds of shifts in Mission Control. Alibaruho served as a Shuttle Orbit Flight Director for Missions STS-126 / ULF-2, STS-127 / ISS-2J/A, STS-128 / ISS-17A, and STS-134 / ULF-6.

During his tenure, Alibaruho served as the Lead ISS Flight Director for Russian EVA 15 and for STS-119 / ISS-15A, the mission which delivered the S6 Solar Array & Truss Segment to the International Space Station. As a Space Shuttle Flight Director, Alibaruho also served as the Lead Flight Director for Mission STS-130 / ISS-20A, the mission that delivered the Node-3 and Cupola to the International Space Station.

After STS-130, Alibaruho was selected to serve a 7-month temporary assignment as Deputy Chief of the EVA, Robotics, and Crew Systems Operations Division, where he assisted the Division Chief in management of approximately 200 civil service and contractor personnel and the Division's two major facilities, the Neutral Buoyancy Laboratory (NBL) and the Space Vehicle Mockup Facility (SVMF).

As his temporary assignment as Deputy Division Chief concluded, NASA directed the addition of one final Space Shuttle Flight to the Program Manifest, STS-135 / ULF-7, which was to be the last Shuttle Flight in U.S. history. Senior Management of Mission Operations Directorate selected Alibaruho to serve as the Lead Space Shuttle Flight Director for this historic mission alongside Lead ISS Flight Director, J. Chris Edelen.

In 2011, Alibaruho delivered the keynote address at the 23rd annual Ugandan North American Association (UNAA) convention in Denver, Colorado.

== Executive career ==
After his NASA career as a Flight Director Kwatsi accepted a role with United Technologies Corporation as a Director of Engineering. He was later promoted to establish UTCs first Program Management Office. Kwatsi later took on a new role at Eaton Corporation as Vice President of Program Management for Aerospace Systems, Electric Vehicles, and Industrial Sector. Kwatsi currently serves as Senior VP of Eatons Industrial sector.

In addition to professional corporate engagement Kwatsi has devoted time to serving on two non-profit boards:

Word of Restoration International church, Inc. Rosharon Texas -Current

The James and Marie Galloway School Friendswood TX -5 years past.

== See also ==
- Robert Kateera
- Brian Mushana Kwesiga
- Ntare Mwine
