= Brian Mushana Kwesiga =

Ugandan-born engineer and former president of the Ugandan North American Association)

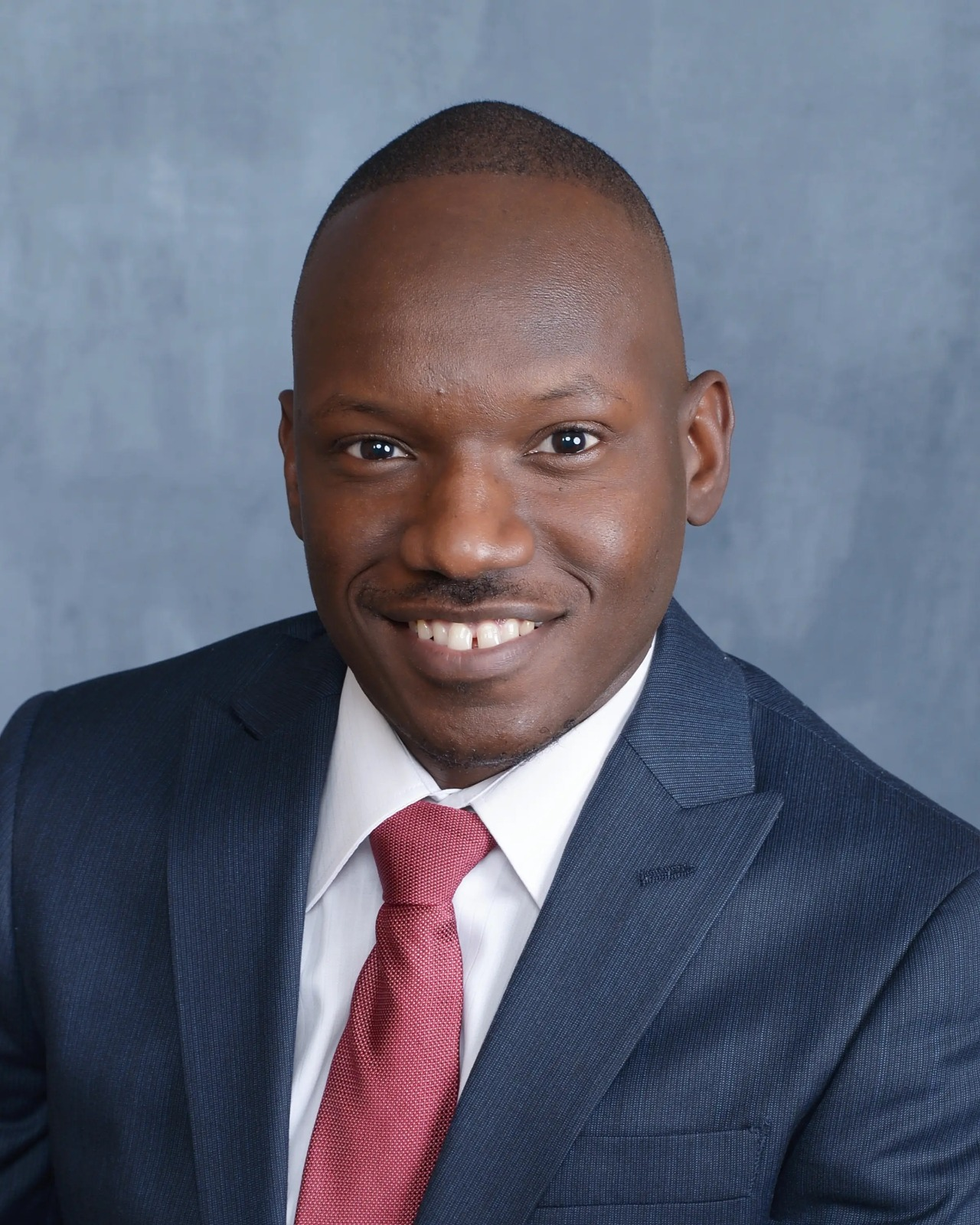
- Kwesiga in 2019
- Other names: Brian M. Kwesiga, Brian Kwesiga, Mushana
- Education: Fletcher School of Law and Diplomacy (Master of Global Business Administration); Southern Methodist University (MS, BS, BA); Dallas College (AS)
- Occupation: Engineer
- Awards: Distinguished Alumni Award

President & CEO, Ugandan North American Association (UNAA)
- In office 1 September 2013 – 6 September 2015
- Deputy: Monday Atigo
- Preceded by: Francis Ssennoga
- Succeeded by: Monday Atigo

Personal details
- Born: 1987 (age 38–39) Rujumbura County, Southwestern Uganda
- Website: www.mushana.com

Brian Mushana Kwesiga (born 1987) is a Ugandan-born engineer and civic leader based in the United States.

He served as president and CEO of the Ugandan North American Association (UNAA) from 2013 to 2015. In 2023, he was appointed general manager of the Uganda men's national lacrosse team, and in 2024, he was selected for the Africa Policy Accelerator, a fellowship program at the Center for Strategic and International Studies (CSIS).

== Early life and education ==
Kwesiga was born in 1987 in Rujumbura County, Rukungiri District in Southwestern Uganda. He moved to the United States at the age of 15 after completing his O-level education at Kibuli Secondary School in Kampala. In the U.S., he earned an Associate of Science degree from the Brookhaven campus of Dallas College in 2005. The college later honored him as a Distinguished Alumni Award recipient in 2020.

He received dual bachelor's degrees: a B.S. in electrical engineering and a B.A. in international studies from Southern Methodist University (SMU) in 2009. He later completed a Master of Science in systems engineering from SMU in 2018 and a Master of Global Business Administration from Tufts University's Fletcher School in 2025. During the Tufts program, he was inducted into the Honos Civicus Society for civic leadership.

== Aerospace career ==
Kwesiga has worked in the United States aerospace and defense industry as a systems engineer. A 2023 profile in CEO East Africa Magazine reported that he has held roles at Lockheed Martin, Northrop Grumman, and Raytheon Technologies. A 2024 feature in the Daily Monitor described him as an aviation and aerospace professional with more than 15 years' experience in systems engineering, software development, flight testing, and program management.

== Civic leadership and public engagement ==
=== Ugandan North American Association (UNAA) presidency ===
In September 2013, Kwesiga was elected president and CEO of the Ugandan North American Association at age 26. New Vision reported that he was the youngest person elected to the position at the time. His two-year term coincided with UNAA’s 25th anniversary and a period of expanded diaspora engagement.

During a 2014 visit in Dallas, Texas, he addressed President Yoweri Museveni on issues affecting the Ugandan diaspora. The Observer reported that Museveni indicated government support to UNAA would be increased fivefold.

Contemporary media reports noted administrative and financial changes within the association during his tenure, including the use of formal banking channels for member payments and the commissioning of an independent audit. He also oversaw the establishment of several programs, including a scholarship program for emerging young Ugandan American leaders, professional-interest networks, a community outreach initiative, and a chapter development fund.

=== Diaspora policy advocacy ===
After his UNAA presidency, Kwesiga spoke publicly on issues affecting the Ugandan diaspora, including overseas voting and political representation. In 2015, the Daily Monitor reported that he supported overseas voting at Ugandan missions, citing remittances and other diaspora contributions as part of the rationale. In the same reporting, government officials discussed plans to expand diaspora engagement, including the creation of a Diaspora Services Department.

He has published opinion pieces on dual citizenship reform and diaspora governance in the New Vision and the Daily Monitor. In 2024, he was selected as a fellow in the Africa Policy Accelerator program at the Center for Strategic and International Studies (CSIS), a Washington, D.C.-based policy think tank.

=== Sports diplomacy ===
In May 2023, the Uganda Lacrosse Association appointed Kwesiga as general manager of the Uganda men's national lacrosse team. New Vision described him as the first Ugandan to hold the position. Media reports stated that he led fundraising and coordination efforts that enabled Uganda to participate in the 2023 World Lacrosse Championship in San Diego. The media reports described Uganda as the only African nation competing at the event.

Earlier, he founded the Dallas Cranes Football Club in 2009, a Ugandan soccer team based in Texas, and was recognized by the DFW International Community Alliance for his leadership.

== See also ==
- Diaspora studies
- Sports diplomacy
- Ugandan Americans
