= Edith Nakalema =

Ugandan military officer (born 1978)

Colonel Edith Nakalema
- Born: 1978 (age 47–48); Uganda
- Citizenship: Uganda
- Education: Makerere University Business School (Diploma in Business Studies); Nkumba University (Bachelor's Degree in Procurement and Logistics Management); Joint Services Command and Staff College (Higher Command and Staff Course); Uganda National Defence College (Defence and Strategic Command Course)
- Occupation: Military officer
- Years active: 2000 to present
- Title: Head of the State House Investor Protection Unit
- Spouse: Lieutenant Colonel Jimmy Asizua

Colonel Edith Nakalema, is a Ugandan military officer, who graduated in August 2018 from the Higher Command and Staff Course at the Joint Services Command and Staff College, in Watchfield, Oxfordshire, United Kingdom, where she had been admitted in 2017.

== Background and education ==
She was born in Kashaari Village, Mbarara District in the Western Region of Uganda, to Midrace Sserwadda, a housewife and Eriyasafu Sserwadda, an Anglican parish priest. She joined the Uganda People's Defence Force (UPDF) in 1999, where she rose to the rank of Major, in the "Special Forces Command", under the command of Muhoozi Kainerugaba. Nakalema holds a Diploma in Business Studies, awarded by Makerere University Business School. She also holds a Bachelor’s Degree in Procurement and Logistics Management, obtained from Nkumba University.

== Career ==
Prior to her arrival at the Uganda State House, Nakalema had worked in the finance department of the Special Forces Command (SFC). She was part of a team that established a working financial and accounting system at the SFC. In 2014, she was appointed to be the personal private secretary (PPS) to the president of Uganda, on the recommendation of the SFC. In November 2016, her role was elevated to that of personal assistant to the president, specifically taking charge of the president's daily itinerary. She was replaced as PPS, by Molly Kamukama, a civilian. In June 2017, Nakalema was selected to attend senior military training in the United Kingdom.

== Other considerations ==
In November 2017, the New Vision newspaper in Kampala, Uganda reported that Major Edith Nakalema was a student at the Joint Services Command and Staff College (JSCSC), in the United Kingdom. As part of the international day celebrations by students at the military college, Nakalema showcased Ugandan attire, cuisine (including food and fruits) and cultural dances. The showcase, attended by staff from Uganda's high commission in London, impressed Air Vice Marshal Chris Luck, the commander of the military school.

To celebrate her graduation from the Joint Services and Command Staff College at the United Kingdom Defence Academy in Shrivenham, Major Nakalema hosted her classmates, instructors, other college staff and their families to a luncheon, attended by over 100 people from 15 different countries.

== Promotion and re-assignment ==
In December 2018, Nakalema was introduced at a public function as a Lieutenant Colonel, who is the head of the State House Anti-Corruption Unit (SH-ACU), based at State House, in Kampala.

In April 2021, the Commander-in-Chief of the UPDF promoted a total of 1,393 military officers. Among those promoted was Edith Nakalema, who was promoted from Lieutenant Colonel to full Colonel.

In January 2022, Nakalema was selected to be part of the pioneer class at the newly established National Defence College, Uganda. She was replaced at SH-ACU by Brigadier Henry Isoke, who previously served as second-in-command at Chieftaincy of Military Intelligence, deputizing Major General Abel Kandiho.

Following her studies at the Uganda National Defence College, she was appointed as the Head of the newly created State House Investor Protection Unit effective May 2023.

== Family ==
Colonel Edith Nakalema is a married mother.

== See also ==
- Proscovia Nalweyiso
- Annette Nkalubo
- Christine Nyangoma
- Rebecca Mpagi
- Flavia Byekwaso
