= Agnes Ameede =

Ugandan politician

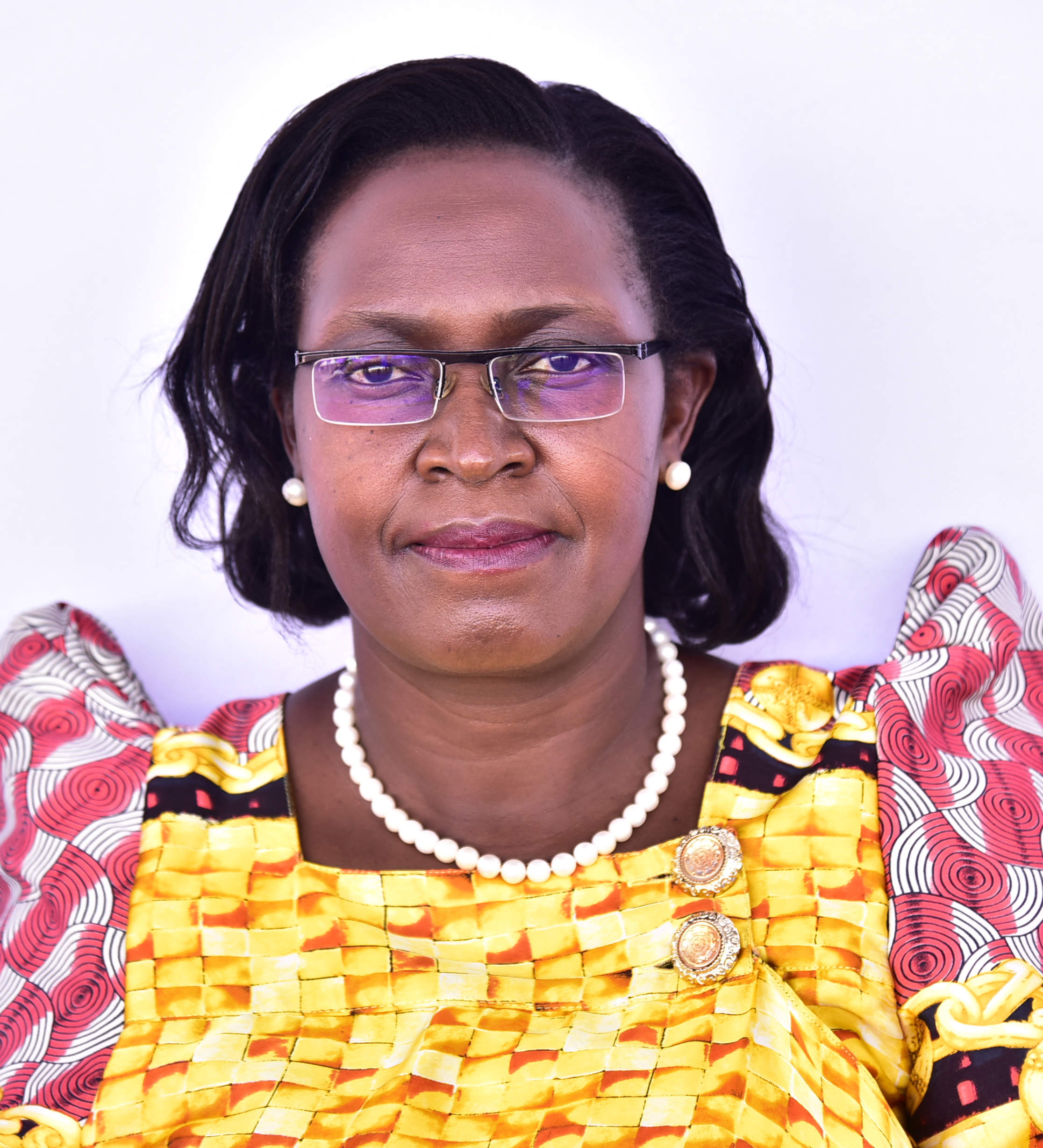

Member of Parliament (Women's Representative)
- Incumbent
- Assumed office 2017
- Preceded by: new district
- Constituency: Butebo District
- In office 2016–2017
- Succeeded by: Faith Alupo
- Constituency: Pallisa District

Personal details
- Born: 12 June 1970 (age 56) Pallisa District, Uganda
- Citizenship: Uganda
- Education: Tororo Girls School; Makerere University (BA); Uganda Management Institute; Law Development Centre; The Open University (MS)
- Occupation: Administrator, politician
- Known for: Politics

Agnes Ameede (born 12 June 1970) is a Ugandan politician who served as the elected Member of Parliament for Pallisa District Women in the 10th Ugandan Parliament (2016–2021).

In the 2026 Ugandan general election, she was re-elected to the 12th Parliament of Uganda as a woman's representative for Butebo District. She was elected on the National Resistance Movement party ticket for the term 2026–2031 with 17,132 votes as confirmed by the Electoral Commission of Uganda.

In May 2026, she was sworn in as the woman MP for Butebo District in the 12th Parliament (2026-2031).

== Early life and education ==
Agnes Ameede was born in Pallisa District, on 12 June 1970, to Mr. and Mrs. Gabriel Olaki, as their fifth child, out of the twelve children they had together. Her father was a primary school teacher and her mother was a housewife.

She attended Kabwangasi Primary School, where her father was the headmaster. She then joined St. Paul's College in the city of Mbale, where she competed her O-Level studies. She continued her studies at Tororo Girls School, where she completed her A-Level education, graduating in 1991, with a High School Diploma.

In 1994, she graduated from Makerere University, Uganda's oldest and largest public university, with a Bachelor of Arts degree. Later, she obtained a Postgraduate Diploma in Management from the Uganda Management Institute (UMI). She followed that with Master of Management degree, also from Uganda Management Institute. Her third degree is a Master of Science in Development Management, awarded by The Open University, in the United Kingdom. She also has a Certificate in Administrative Law, obtained from the Law Development Centre in Kampala.

== Career ==
=== Before politics ===
In 1996, Agnes Ameede was hired by the Ugandan Ministry of Internal Affairs as an Immigration Officer, and posted to the Immigration Office at Malaba, Uganda. She served there for three years and was then transferred to the Ministry's headquarters in Kampala, Uganda's capital.

In 2003, she was transferred to Entebbe International Airport, serving there until 2005. In 2006 she was promoted to Supervisor, Inspection and Legal, and transferred back to the Kampala headquarters. In 2009, she was posted to Liberia, as an Immigration Advisor, working there with the United Nations until the end of 2010.

From Liberia, she was posted to Entebbe Airport as Supervisor, Inspection and Legal. In 2015, she was promoted to Senior Immigration Officer. Later that year, she resigned from Immigration and joined active elective Ugandan politics.

=== As a politician ===
In the 2016 national election cycle, Agnes Ameede successfully contested for the Pallisa District Women Constituency, in the Ugandan Parliament. She ran as a member of the ruling National Resistance Movement political party. One of the losing candidates, Catherine Achola, challenged the results in court, but Agnes Ameede prevailed there as well.

In the 10th Parliament, she is a member of (a) the parliamentary Committee On Commissions, State Authorities & State Enterprises (COSASE) and (b) the parliamentary Committee On East African Community Affairs (COEACA).

== Family ==
Agnes Ameede is married to Lawrence Omulen and together are the parents to three daughters.

== See also ==
- Anna Ebaju Adeke
- Anita Among
- Doreen Amule
- Pallisa District
- Parliament of Uganda
- List of members of the tenth Parliament of Uganda
