= Annette Nkalubo =

Ugandan lawyer and military officer

Colonel Annette Nkalubo
- Born: Uganda
- Citizenship: Uganda
- Education: Makerere University (Bachelor of Laws); Law Development Centre (Diploma in Legal Practice)
- Occupations: Lawyer and Military Officer
- Years active: 1996 - present
- Known for: Military Matters
- Title: Colonel in the Uganda People's Defence Force

Colonel Annette Nkalubo is a senior Ugandan military officer. She is the second highest-ranking military officer in the Uganda People's Defence Forces (UPDF).

== Education ==
Nkalubo holds a Bachelor of Laws from Makerere University, She also holds a Diploma in Legal Practice obtained from the Law Development Centre, also in Kampala.

== Career ==
Nkalubo, while at the rank of lieutenant, served as a Member of Parliament, representing the UPDF in the 6th parliament (1996 to 2001). She was promoted from the rank of major to lieutenant colonel in October 2008. In 2010, at the rank of lieutenant colonel, she served, on secondment, at the United Nations. In March 2011, Annette Nkalubo, at the rank of lieutenant colonel, served as the director of women's affairs in the UPDF. In January 2013, she was promoted from lieutenant colonel to colonel, making her the second highest-ranking woman military officer, behind Major General Proscovia Nalweyiso.

== Other considerations ==
In March 2011, she was named among "Uganda's Top 50 Women Movers", of the time.

== See also ==
- Proscovia Nalweyiso
- Flavia Byekwaso
- Edith Nakalema
- Rebecca Mpagi
- Christine Nyangoma
- Naomi Karungi
