= Nathan Byanyima =

Ugandan politician

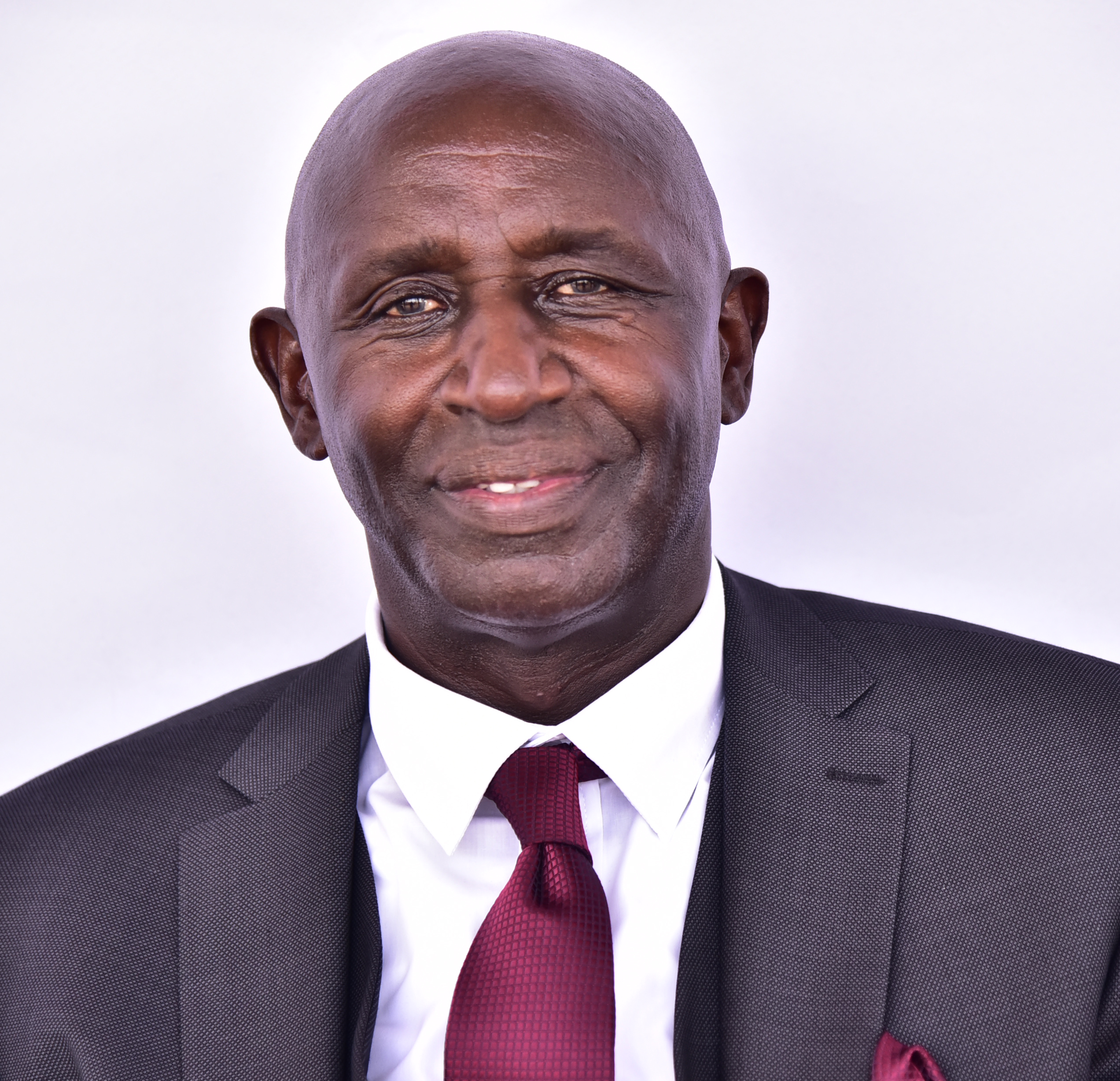

Member of Parliament
- Constituency: Bukanga North, Isingiro District

Personal details
- Born: 27 August 1956 (age 69) Uganda
- Party: National Resistance Movement (NRM)
- Profession: Engineer, Social Worker, Politician

Nathan Byanyima (born 27 August 1956) is a Ugandan engineer, social worker and politician. He represents the people of Bukanga North, Isingiro district in the Parliament of Uganda as member of parliament. He is affiliated to the National Resistance Movement party.

== Career ==
Byanyima was the National Resistance Movement flag bearer (NRM) Bukanga North constituency in the 2026 Uganda General Elections. He is also currently the member of parliament for the same constituency. In the parliament of Uganda, Byanyima serves on the committee on physical infrastructure.

=== Political career ===
On 19 July 2025, Nathan Byanyima was declared the National Resistance Movement (NRM) flag bearer for Bukanga North ahead of the 2026 general election after winning the party primary with 30,302 votes (69 per cent), defeating Julius Tumuhimbise (5,845; 13 per cent) and Jeremiah Kamurari (4,590; 9 per cent). After the declaration, he said he intended to seek re-election for what he described as a final parliamentary term (2026 to 2031).

In November 2013, Byanyima contested for the Bukanga county for the MP position as independent, this followed the death of the incumbent of parliament, Gregory Matovu and the seat became vacant. In the race, there were four other candidates including Steven Kangwagye on the NRM ticket, Shafique Dembe under Forum for Democratic Change (FDC), and Abel Tumusime as independent. Byanyima got 16946 votes and lost to Steven Kangwagye who won with 18,204 votes in the bi-elections.

== See also ==
- Lillian Aber
- Ruth Achieng
- Concy Aciro
- Perez Ahabwe
- Grace Akello
- Jennifer Alanyo
- Alice Kaboyo
