= Herbert Edmund Ariko =

Member of Parliament for Gweri County
- Incumbent
- Assumed office 2026
- Constituency: Gweri County, Soroti District

Member of Parliament for Soroti East Division
- In office 2022–2026
- Constituency: Soroti East Division, Soroti City

Member of Parliament for Soroti Municipality
- In office 2016–2021
- Constituency: Soroti Municipality

Personal details
- Born: 19 July 1975
- Citizenship: Ugandan
- Party: National Resistance Movement
- Occupation: Social scientist, politician

Herbert Edmund Ariko also Herbert Edmund Okworo Ariko (born 19 July 1975) is a Ugandan social scientist and politician who represents Gweri County in the 12th Parliament of Uganda.

== Career ==
Ariko entered elective politics in 2016 when he was elected Member of Parliament for Soroti Municipality on the Forum for Democratic Change (FDC) ticket. He later left the FDC and joined the National Resistance Movement (NRM) in May 2021. In July 2022, he won the Soroti East Division parliamentary by-election after the Court of Appeal nullified the 2021 election due to irregular constituency boundaries. His victory was later upheld after the High Court dismissed an election petition challenging the results.

During the 11th Parliament, Ariko was appointed Chairperson of the Committee on Environment and Natural Resources. In 2026, Ariko became the Member of Parliament for Gweri County, Soroti District after winning the 2026 general election, serving a term of office from 2026 to 2031 in the 12th Parliament of Uganda.

== See also ==
- Anna Ebaju Adeke
- Angelline Osegge
