= Rosemary Kerwegi =

Ugandan educator and legislator (1951–2001)

Rosemary Kerwegi Honourable

Woman Member of Parliament, Apac District 1996 – 2001
- Preceded by: Molly Ogweng
- Succeeded by: Beatrice Lagada

Personal details
- Born: Rosemary Kerwegi; 1 January 1951
- Died: 5 May 2001 (aged 50)
- Education: Tororo Girls School
- Alma mater: Institute of Teacher Education, Kyambogo; University of Reading

Rosemary Kerwegi (1951 – 5 May 2001) was a Ugandan educator, legislator and Woman Member of Parliament for Apac District in Uganda's sixth Parliament (1996–2001).

== Background and education ==
According to her eulogy given at a Parliamentary sitting in May 2001, Kerwegi was born to Obadia Oryam, a civil servant and Alice Achieng.

She attended Tororo Girls School between 1965 and 1971. She later attended Institute of Teacher Education, Kyambogo and later the University of Reading in the United Kingdom where she "specialised in counselling and guidance".

== Career ==
=== Pre-politics ===
Kerwegi taught at various schools such as Nabisunsa Girls School and Kyambogo College School before moving to the Ministry of Education and Sports. She worked at the ministry from 1981 to 1996 when she left to join politics. While there, she served as the Secretary on the Central Scholarships Committee.

=== Politics ===
Kerwegi successfully contested in the 1996 Ugandan parliamentary elections and thereafter was the Woman Member of Parliament for Apac District in Uganda's sixth parliament.

She served on Parliament's Committees of Appointments and Social Services

== Death ==
Kerwegi passed on in May 2001 at the International Hospital Kampala. The cause of death was given as "pneumonia and respiratory failure"

== See also ==
- Alupo Jesica
- Anita Among
