= Jennifer Alanyo =

Ugandan physician, military officer and legislator

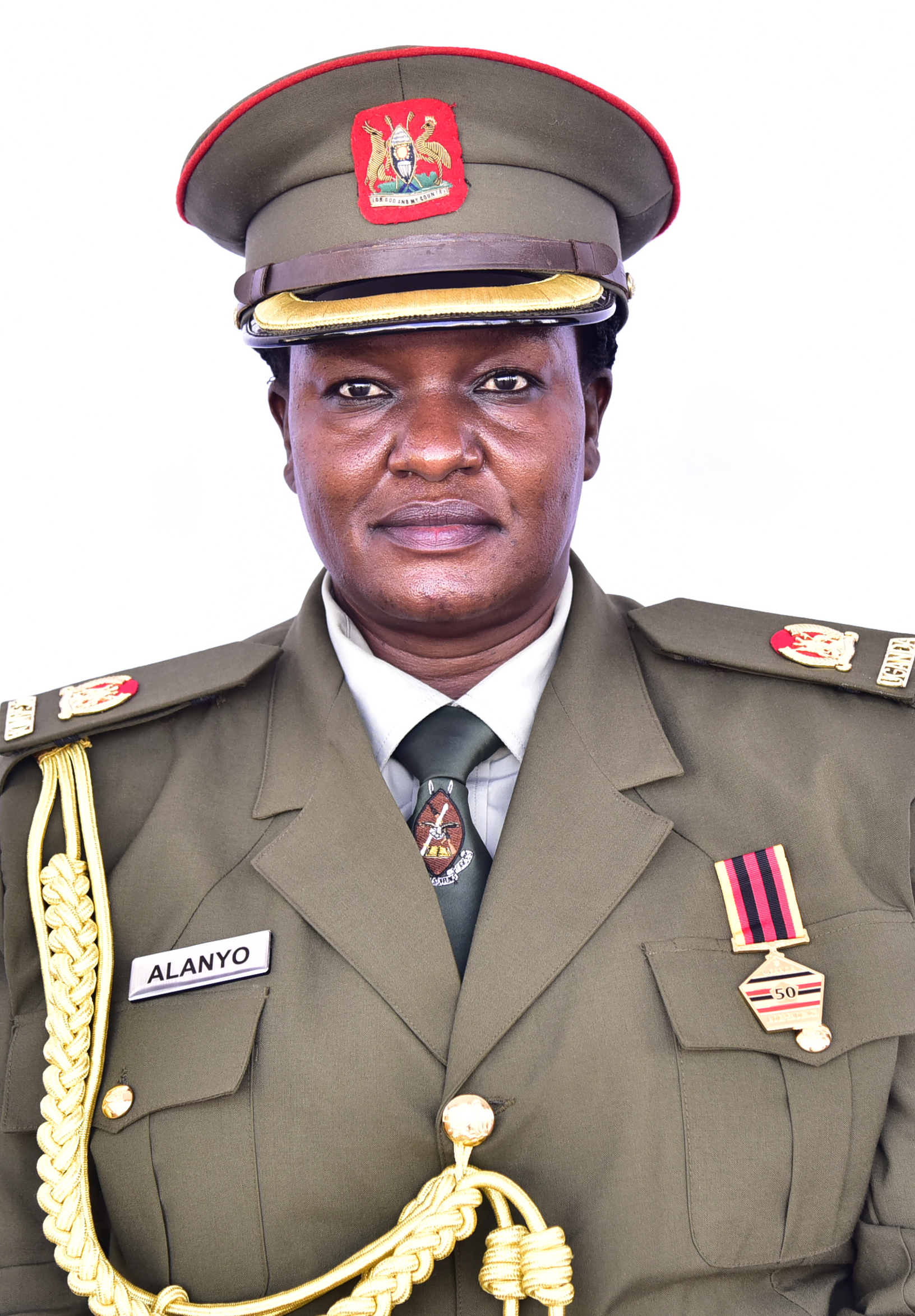

UPDF Representative in the Parliament of Uganda
- Incumbent
- Assumed office 2021

Personal details
- Born: Uganda
- Education: Medical Doctor (MBChB)
- Occupation: Physician, Military Officer, Legislator
- Known for: One of the three female UPDF Representatives in Parliament; UPDF Major and medical doctor; Service on the Committee of Science, Technology and Innovation

Military service
- Rank: Major, Uganda People's Defence Forces (UPDF)

Jennifer Alanyo is a Ugandan physician, military officer and legislator. She represents the Uganda people's defence forces (UPDF) in the parliament of Uganda.

== Background and education ==
Alanyo is a medical doctor by profession. She is also a UPDF military officer at the rank of Major.

== Career ==
She was voted into parliament to represent the Uganda People's Defense Forces (UPDF) in 2021 on recommendation from the military council and subsequent voting by military personnel.

She is among the three (3) female representatives of UPDF in parliament, the others include, Charity Bainababo and Victor Nekesa.

In parliament, she serves on the committee of science, technology and innovation.
