= Embassy of Uganda, Paris =

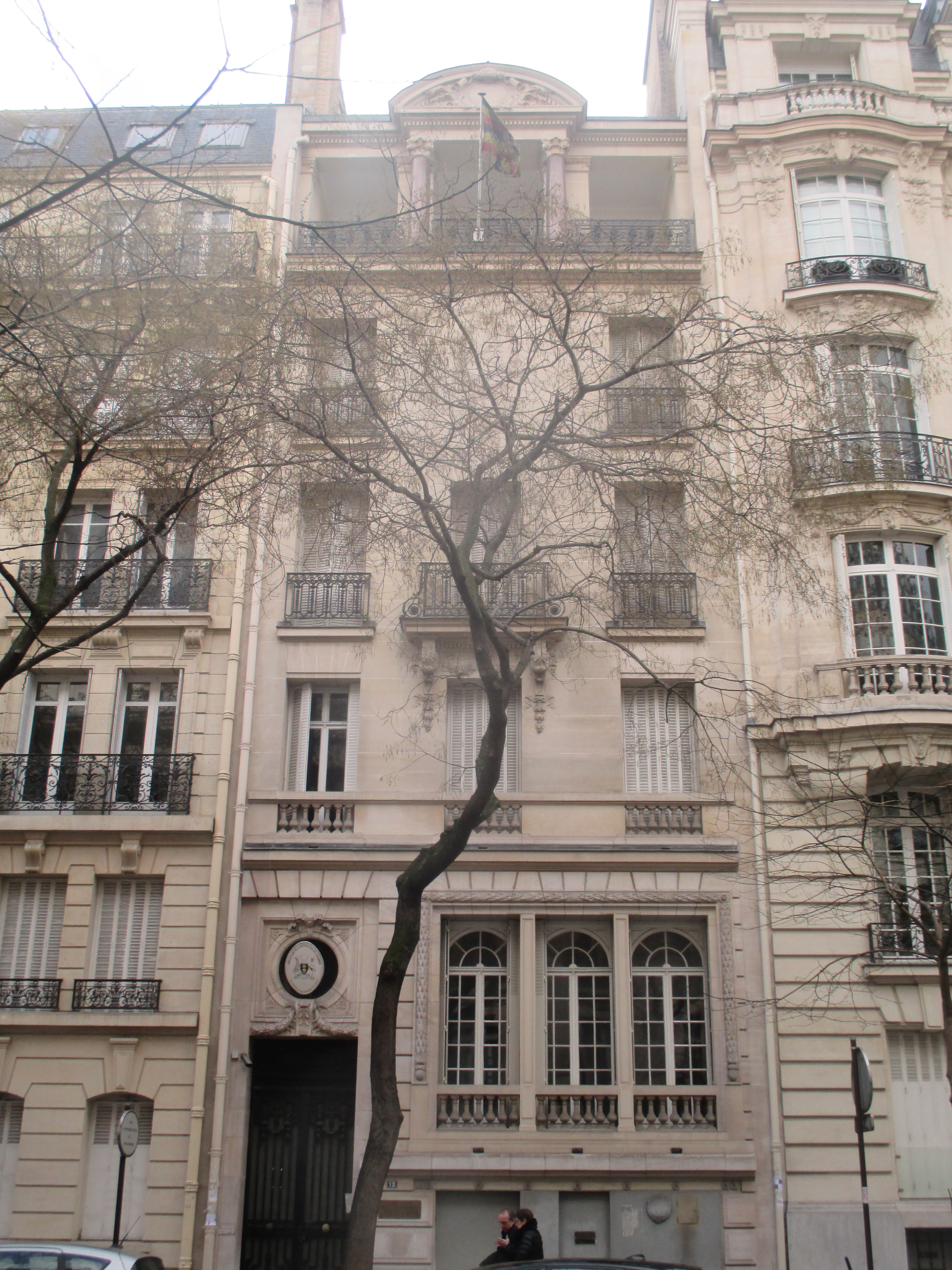
- Picture of the front of the embassy, 2016.
- Location: Paris
- Address: 13, Raymond-Poincaré Avenue, 16th arrondissement
- Coordinates: 48.864444°N 2.286667°E
- Ambassador: Doreen Amule
- Website: paris.mofa.go.ug

The embassy of Uganda in France is the diplomatic mission of Uganda to France. It is located on 13, Raymond-Poincaré avenue, in the 16th arrondissement of Paris. Since 2022, its ambassador has been Doreen Amule.

== Embassy ==
The embassy is located on Raymond-Poincaré Avenue, in the 16th arrondissement of Paris.

== Ambassadors of Uganda to France ==
Date of nomination	Sending date of letters of credence	Ambassador
1989		Winnie Byanyima
	12 November 1996	David Kantaale Kazungu
	18 December 2003	Rhoda Kaisho Sinani
	28 April 2006	Elizabeth Paula Napeyok
	15 November 2013	Nishima Jayant Madhvani
September 2017	13 October 2017	Richard Nduhuura
	22 July 2022	Doreen Amule
