= Denise Ayebare =

Ugandan climate justice activist (born 2002)

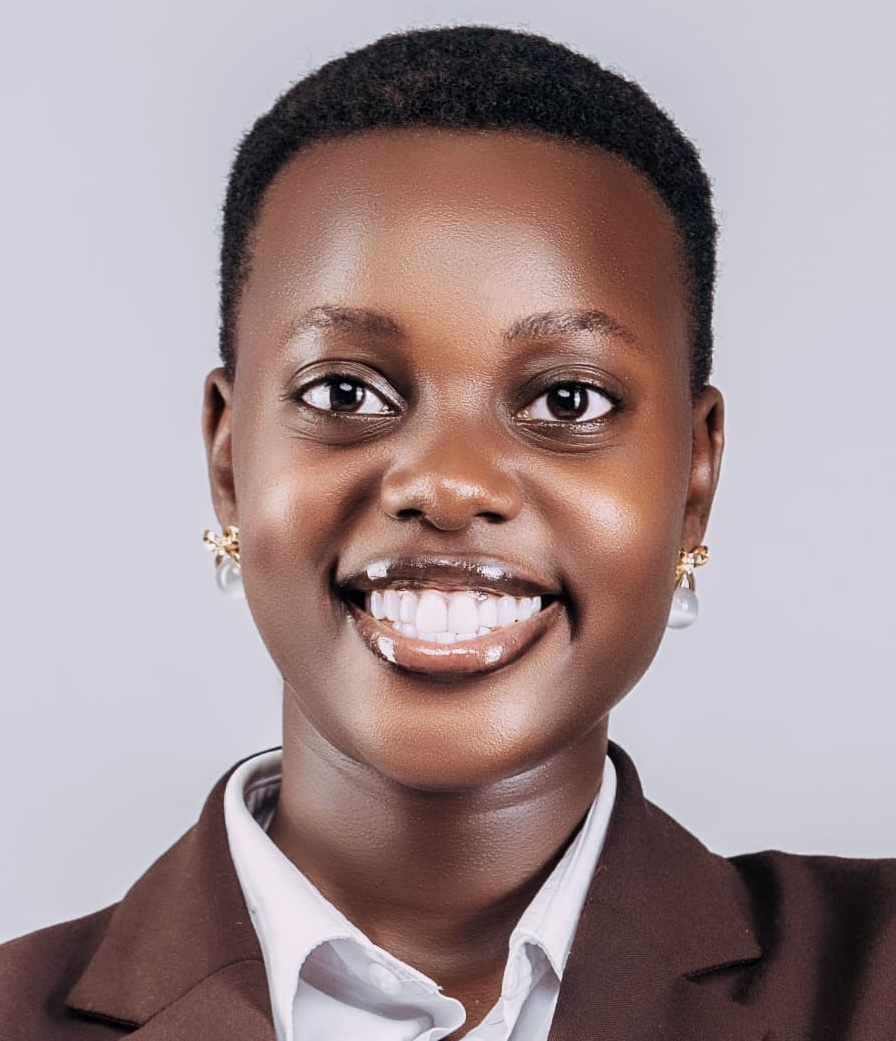
- Born: Akampurira Denise Ayebare; 23 November 2002 (age 23); Uganda
- Education: Makerere University
- Organization: BetterLife International
- Known for: Climate justice activism
- Awards: Diana Award (2024)
- Honours: Forbes 30 Under 30 (2026)
- Website: Ayebare Denise

Akampurira Denise Ayebare, commonly referred to as Denise Ayebare (Born 23 November 2002), is a Ugandan climate justice activist and youth leader. She is the founder and executive director of BetterLife International, a youth-led NGO addressing climate resilience and green skills training across Africa.

Ayebare has held youth leadership roles in Uganda including currently the Secretary for External Relations of the National Youth Council of Uganda, Youth Presidential Advisor on Climate Change since 2024, serving as Prime Minister of the National Youth Parliament (2022–2023) and representing African youth on the global stage, acting as a Youth Climate Action Negotiator at UN climate conferences. She has received awards including Forbes Africa 30 Under 30 for 2026, the 2024 Diana Award, and Uganda's Climate Activist of the Year 2024 among others.

== Biography ==
Ayebare was born on 23 November 2002 in Uganda. She enrolled at Makerere University in Kampala, where she studied law.

=== Career ===
In June 2021, Ayebare co-founded BetterLife International Organization in Uganda. BetterLife has expanded from a local youth initiative into a pan-African NGO. The organization works in Uganda, South Sudan, Tanzania, Ghana and the DR Congo, providing climate-smart agriculture training, clean-energy installations, vocational skills and environmental education to thousands of refugees, internally displaced families, and other vulnerable communities. For example, BetterLife built dozens of community biogas digesters and launched the Soilla App (for soil health guidance) to help smallholder farmers adapt to climate change.

Parallel to her NGO work, Ayebare has held several youth leadership positions in Uganda. In 2022 she was elected the 5th Prime Minister of the National Youth Parliament of Uganda until 2023. She has served as East African Representative and later Vice Chairperson of the Pan African University Debate Council. In 2022, she was appointed a Climate Change and Legal Specialist in the Intergovernmental Authority on Development (IGAD) Youth Envoy Office. She was also shortlisted in candidates for Commonwealth Youth Council executive in 2024. She also served as Climate Change Lead (June 2022–July 2024) and as Secretary for External Relations of the National Youth Council of Uganda, a statutory body mandated by an Act of Parliament to coordinate, monitor, and represent youth interests across the country. In May 2024 she was named Youth Presidential Advisor on Climate Change to the President of Uganda.

Internationally, starting in mid-2022 Ayebare became a Youth Climate Action Negotiator for the African Union (under the UNFCCC). She has represented Uganda's youth delegation at major global forums including UN climate conferences (COP27, COP28, COP29) and Stockholm+50.

== Recognition ==
- 2022: Won Miss Tourism Kigezi.
- 2022: 2nd runner-up in Miss Tourism Uganda.
- 2024: She received the Diana Award (UK) for young leaders.
- 2024: She was honored as Climate Activist of the Year by GIZ and the EU in Uganda.
- 2024: New Vision listed her among national “Top 40 Under 40” leaders.
- 2025: She was shortlisted among the 15 finalists for the Moonshot Non-Profit Award
- 2025: Moonshot Borderless Award.
- 2025: Awarded the Ubuntu Impact Award by Pan African University Debate Council.
- 2025: Recognized among Top 100 Most African Influential Women by the African Women Awards.
- 2025: Recognized among Top 25 Under 25 Gen Z Founders in the World by Future Minds Network Australia.
- 2026: She was named to Forbes Africa's 30 Under 30 list.
