= Christine Nyangoma =

Ugandan military officer

Major Christine Nyangoma
- Born: January 1, 1967 (age 59); Kabarole District, Uganda
- Citizenship: Uganda
- Occupation: Military Officer
- Years active: 1982 - present
- Known for: Military Matters
- Title: Commander of UPDF Women’s Unit in Somalia

Major Christine Nyangoma, is a senior Ugandan military officer in the Uganda People's Defence Forces (UPDF). She is the Commander of the UPDF Women’s Unit in Somalia, as part of the African Unions force, AMISOM.

== Background ==
She was born on 1 January 1967, in Kabarole District, in the Western Region of Uganda. She attended Kazingo Primary School for her elementary schooling. She transferred to Mpanga Secondary School in Fort Portal for her secondary school studies. While there, she was recruited in the National Resistance Army (NRA), joining the Ugandan Bush War, circa 1982. Since then she has undergone military and political training at local and international military, political and command institutions.

== Military career ==
In June 2008, Nyangoma, at the rank of Captain, was appointed Staff Officer, in the Directorate of Women Services Personnel, in the Uganda People's Defence Force (UPDF), by the then Chief of Defence Force (CDF), the late General Aronda Nyakairima (7 July 1959 to 12 September 2015).

She was part of the UPDF contingent that battled the rebels of the Allied Democratic Forces (ADF) in the Rwenzori sub-region, with operations extending into neighboring Democratic Republic of the Congo (DRC), during the Operation Iron Fist. She also was part of Operation Safe Haven that mounted operations against the rebel Lord’s Resistance Army (LRA) in Uganda's Northern Region, with operations extending into neighboring Southern Sudan.

Her first tour in Somalia was in 2010, at the rank of captain, as a member of a logistics unit. That tour ended in 2012. She was deployed again on a second tour, on 31 October 2016, as the Officer-in-Charge of Women's Affairs, UPDF's entire contingent to AMISOM. That tour was still ongoing as of October 2017.

== Personal ==
Major Christine Nyangoma is a mother of one son.

== See also ==
- Proscovia Nalweyiso
- Annette Nkalubo
- Edith Nakalema
- UG Military Schools
