= Lillian Aber =

Ugandan politician and PLU vice

Lillian Aber Honorable
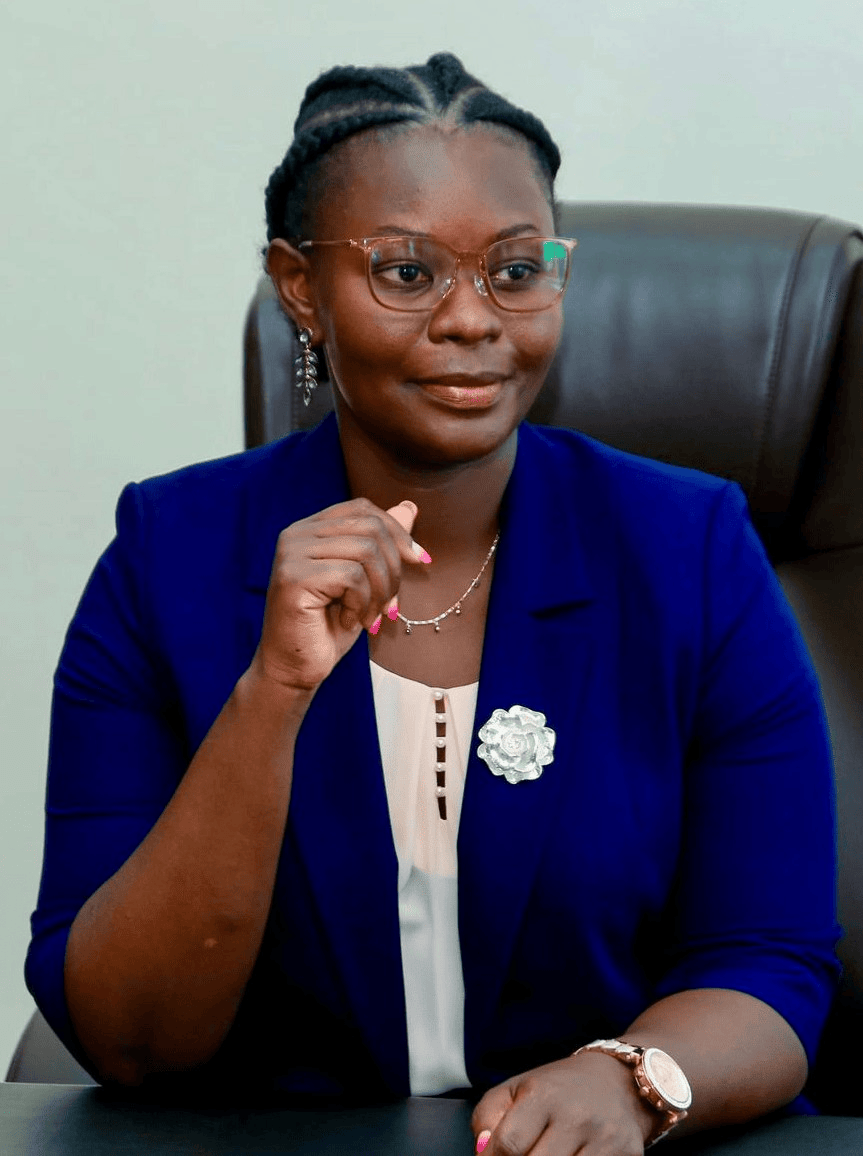
- Hon. Lillian Aber

Member of Parliament
- Incumbent
- Assumed office 17 May 2021

Personal details
- Born: Lillian Aber; 08 August 1987 (age 39) Kitgum District
- Party: National Resistance Movement
- Education: (Makerere University) (Literature and Communication) (Master of Business Administration of Oil and Gas) (Uganda Christian University); Honorary Doctorate(PhD) (Zoe Life Theological College U.S.A).
- Occupation: Politician, Public Administrator
- Known for: Public Administration, leadership, Politics

Lillian Aber is a Ugandan politician and public administrator who serves as the women representative for Kitgum District in the eleventh Parliament of Uganda.

In 2024, Aber was appointed by President Yoweri Museveni as State Minister for Relief, Disaster Preparedness and Refugees Affairs in the office of the Prime Minister. She was re-appointed to the same position in May 2026 following her re-election to parliament as the Woman Member of Parliament for Kitgum district in Northern Uganda.

== Education ==
In 2016, Aber earned a bachelor's degree in Literature and Communication from Makerere University. She also earned a Master of Business Administration of Oil and Gas from Uganda Christian University in 2018 and another master’s degree in Public Administration and Management from Makerere University in 2019. Aber was also awarded an Honorary PhD from Zoe Life Theological College in the United States of America .

== Career ==
Aber's involvement in politics began at Makerere University. As a freshman, she won the election to become Guild Representative Councillor (GRC) of the School of Arts in the College of Humanities and Social Sciences. She was then appointed as a Guild Minister by the Guild President, Anna Ebaju Adeke that year. As a sophomore, she stood for the guild presidency on the Forum For Democratic Change party ticket, but lost to Bwowe Ivan, who later appointed her as Guild Vice President.

While Guild Vice President, she made a bid for the presidency of the Uganda National Students Union (UNSA) which she won in 2015, replacing Matanda Abubaker (the UNSA President from 2013 to 2014). Aber later moved from the Forum For Democratic Change party to the National Resistance Movement party when standing for the position of Chairperson of the National Youth Council. She was elected to this position in November 2015, polling 119 votes ahead of George Abudul who polled 105 votes.

Aber is a senior presidential advisor on youth and a UN youth delegate. Aber also is a former Commonwealth students association representative in charge of partnerships and advocacy. In 2018, Aber joined the Uganda constitutional review team. In 2016 she had unsuccessfully stood for the East African Legislative Assembly.

In January 2021, Aber won the women's representative seat for Kitgum District. In the 2021 general election, Aber won with 41,192 votes against Roselyn Alanyo Olobo of the Uganda People's Congress and Norah Odokorach, an independent candidate.

== Personal life ==
She is also the founder and director of Laber Foundation, a non-governmental charity organisation based in Kitgum.

== See also ==
- Taban Sharifah Aate
- Jesca Ababiku
- Dorcus Acen
- Jane Aceng
- Nathan Byanyima
