= National Youth Council Uganda =

National Youth Council

National Youth Council
Agency overview
- Formed: 1993; 33 years ago
- Jurisdiction: Government of Uganda
- Headquarters: Kampala, Uganda
- Parent agency: Ministry of Gender, Labour and Social Development, Government of Uganda
- Website: https://www.nyc.go.ug/

National Youth Council (NYC) is a government-established statutory body responsible for representing, mobilising, and coordinating young people’s participation in Uganda’s social, economic, and political development. It was established on 30 April 1993 through the National Youth Council Act, Cap. 319 and serves as an umbrella organisation for youth leadership, advocacy, empowerment, and engagement with government and other stakeholders on youth-related issues.

== Location ==
The headquarters of the National Youth Council Uganda are located at plot 25, Martyrs’ Way, Mukulu Curve off Ntinda Road, Kampala, Uganda.

== History ==
The National Youth Council was established in 1993 through the National Youth Council Act, 1993 following government recognition of the need for organised youth representation in national development processes. It was formed to empower young people, promote leadership, and ensure youth participation in governance and decision-making.

== Administration ==
The National Youth Council operates through a decentralised structure comprising the national, district, county, sub-county/division, parish/ward, and village youth councils. It is led by an elected National Youth Executive Committee headed by the National Chairperson.

The NYC has been led by several youth leaders, including Hon. James Ebitu, who served as chairperson during the early establishment and consolidation period of the council in the late 1990s to early 2000s and Hon. Ronald Kibuule, who served as National Youth Council Chairperson from 2006 to 2011 before joining national politics, where he later became a Member of Parliament and a government minister.

Hon. Lillian Aber served as Chairperson of the National Youth Council (NYC) from 2015 to 2020, becoming the first female elected NYC Chairperson, while Jacob Eyeru served as the Chairperson from 2020 to 2026. In May 2026, a new NYC executive was sworn in, marking the transition from Jacob Eyeru’s administration to Daniel Ongom’s leadership as the new Chairperson.

== See also ==
- Lillian Aber
- Ministry of Gender, Labour and Social Development
