= Mwanje Gideon =

Ugandan lawyer and legal commentator

- Other name: Batapa
- Citizenship: Uganda
- Education: Nkumba University (LLB); Law Development Centre, Kampala
- Occupations: Lawyer, legal commentator, author
- Known for: President, Uganda Law Students Association; Inaugural President, Law Students' Association of East Africa

Mwanje Gideon (also known as Batapa) is a Ugandan lawyer, legal commentator, and author. He served as the inaugural president of the Law Students Association of East Africa (LSAEA) from 2023 to 2024, becoming the first student from Nkumba University to hold the position. Prior to that role, he was the 6th president of Uganda Law Students Association. The LSAEA an umbrella body uniting law students from Uganda, Kenya, Rwanda, and other East African countries.

== Early life and education ==
Mwanje Gideon was raised in Bamunaniika, Luwero District, Uganda.

He studied law at Nkumba University, where he founded the Nkumba University School of Law Research Club and served as founding editor of the Nkumba University Law Students Journal (NULSJ). He also served as Attorney General of the Nkumba University Guild Government during his studies. He subsequently enrolled at the Law Development Centre, Kampala, to complete his postgraduate bar course.

One of his lecturers at Nkumba University, Dr. Suzan Nakanwagi, described him as "a multi-talented young man who is also very hardworking, proactive, respectful, and obedient."

== Career ==
=== Uganda Law Students Association ===
In August 2023, Mwanje was elected President of the Uganda Law Students Association (ULSA), the umbrella organisation representing law faculties from over ten universities across Uganda. The election took place at the Islamic University in Uganda (IUIU)-Kampala Campus, where 9 out of 11 Law Society presidents voted in his favour, giving him 80% of the vote. He became the first student from Nkumba University to hold the ULSA presidency since the association's founding.

He was officially sworn in on 12 August 2023 at a ceremony presided over by the association's patron, Benard Oundo, at Citadel Advocates, Nakasero, Kampala. During his tenure, he attended the 28th East African Law Society Conference in Bujumbura, Burundi.

Upon the conclusion of his one-year tenure in October 2024, the incoming ULSA leadership commended him for being "humble and hardworking," crediting these qualities for his achievements during his presidency.

As a leader in regional student bodies, Mwanje transitioned from campus leadership to public interest advocacy. In 2025, representing the Law Students Association of East Africa, he spearheaded a landmark constitutional lawsuit filed in the East African Court of Justice against the Attorney General of Uganda and the Uganda Law Council. The suit sought to compel the compulsory integration of East African Community (EAC) Law into the core curricula of all accredited Ugandan law schools to better prepare future lawyers for regional integration.

=== Law Students' Association of East Africa ===
In May 2024, while still serving as ULSA President, Mwanje was unanimously endorsed as the inaugural President of the Law Students' Association of East Africa (LSAEA). The election was presided over by Kenyan Advocate Counsel Athieno Julie Ogolla and saw endorsement from Law Students' Association Presidents across East African countries. He was deputised by Esther Odipo Ayoo, the President of the Law Students Association of Kenya.

New Vision reported him as the first ever president of the LSAEA, noting he was 24 years old at the time of his swearing-in. He pledged to work with law students across the region to promote legal excellence and unity during his one-year tenure.

During his tenure as LSAEA President, he was quoted by New Vision in a feature on youth unemployment, arguing that Uganda must invest in talent development and cottage industries, and calling for a two-year tax holiday for new enterprises to allow them to grow before being taxed.

== Writing and commentary ==
Mwanje is the author of The Law and the Common Person, a book aimed at making legal concepts accessible to non-lawyers. He has written on Ugandan and East African legal affairs, with commentary published in The Observer, the Uganda Observer, and Mulengera News.

His published writing covers the following areas:

Campaign finance reform

Writing in The Observer in August 2025, he argued that unlimited campaign spending poses a fundamental threat to Ugandan democracy and called for a dedicated Campaign Funds Regulation Act to regulate the flow of money into political campaigns.

Protection of Sovereignty Bill

He criticised Uganda's Protection of Sovereignty Bill as a piece of legislation that risks deterring foreign investment and undermining East African Community integration obligations, arguing it contradicts the Treaty for the Establishment of the East African Community which defines partner state citizens as non-foreign.

Doctrine of precedent

Writing in The Observer in February 2026, he examined what he described as the erosion of stare decisis in Ugandan courts, arguing that lower courts were increasingly departing from established precedent in ways that threatened legal certainty.

Digital rights

He has written on the right to be forgotten in Ugandan law, examining the legal and privacy implications of digital data retention following the enactment of relevant data protection legislation in Uganda.

Music and copyright law

He has published on copyright law in the Ugandan music industry, including a piece in the Nkumba University Law Students Journal examining musical work copyright in Uganda in light of the Angella Katatumba case.
