= Nkumba =

Neighborhood in Uganda

- Map of Uganda showing the location of Nkumba
- Coordinates: 00°05′36″N 32°30′22″E
- Country: Uganda
- Region: Central Uganda
- District: Wakiso District
- County: Busiro
- Constituency: Busiro South

Government
  - Member of Parliament: Peter Simon Sematimba
- Elevation: 1,175 m (3,855 ft)
- Time zone: UTC+3 (EAT)

Nkumba is an urban area in Wakiso District in the Buganda Region of Uganda. The area is primarily a university town, on account of Nkumba University, a private university that maintains its main campus in the neighborhood.

== Location ==
Nkumba is off of the tarmacked Kampala–Entebbe Road. It is approximately 10 kilometres (6 mi), by road, north-east of Entebbe, on the northern shores of Lake Victoria. It lies in Katabi Sub-county, in Busiro County, Wakiso District, in the Buganda Region of Uganda.

The geographical coordinates of Nkumba are 0°05'36.0"N, 32°30'22.0" (Latitude:0.093333; Longitude:32.506111). Nkumba lies at an average elevation of 1,175 metres (3,855 ft), above sea level.

== Overview ==
Nkumba is a mixed-use (commercial and residential), middle class neighborhood. Close to the Kampala–Entebbe Road, the dominant business is the main campus of Nkumba University, with an estimated 12,000 student enrollment. Near the university campus are private student hostels, restaurants, stationery stores, air-time kiosks, banks and related businesses.

Farther inland, away from the highway, the neighbourhood is primarily residential. One can find plots of land for sale, on which to construct a residence, or a business. Closer to the lake, there is potential for resort facilities, which is yet unexploited. Kasenyi Landing Site, a fishing village, lies at the end of the road that connects to Abayita Ababiri, on the Kampala–Entebbe Road.

== Prominent people ==
The paternal grandfather to Queen Sylvia of Buganda, Nelson Edmond Nkalubo Sebugwawo owns a home in Bufulu, Nkumba. Nagginda lived here from the age of about four years of age until the age of about 7 years old, while she attended Lake Victoria Primary School, in nearby Entebbe.
