= Christine Alalo =

Ugandan peacekeeper and police commissioner (1970–2019)

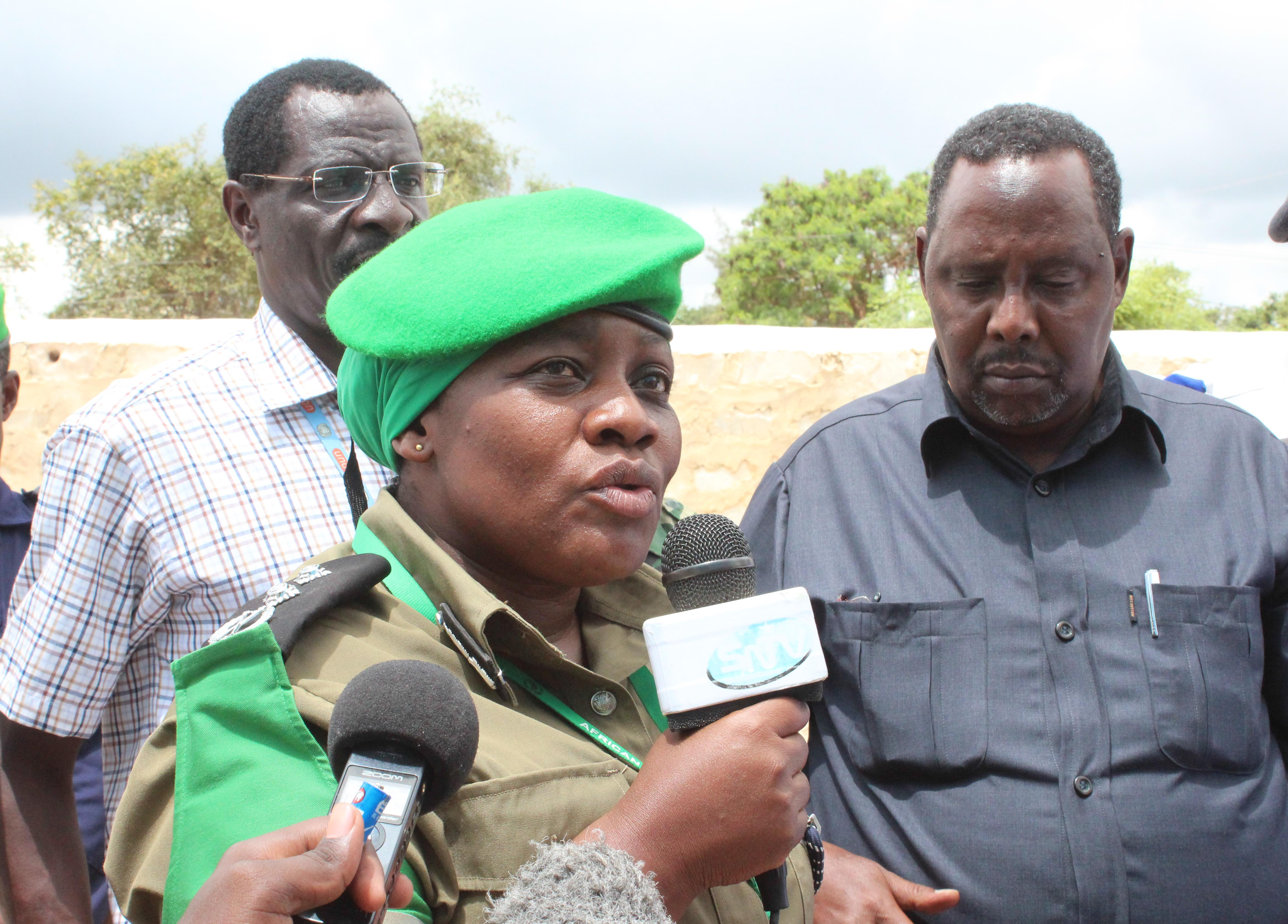
- Christine Alalo, 2015
- Born: March 21, 1970; Kalaki, Kaberamaido District, Uganda
- Died: March 10, 2019 (aged 48); Bishoftu, Oromia Region, Ethiopia
- Education: Moroto Municipal Council Primary School; Swairia Primary School, Soroti District; Tororo Girls' School for O Levels; Immaculate Heart Girls' Secondary School, in Rukungiri District; Makerere University (B.Soc.)
- Occupation: Peace keeper
- Years active: 2001-2019
- Known for: AMISOM, UNMISS; EU Human Rights Defenders Award, 2014
- Awards: 2014 - EU Human Rights Defenders Award

Christine Alalo (21 March 1970 – 10 March 2019) was a Ugandan peacekeeper and police commissioner, who received the EU Human Rights Defenders Award in 2014. She was one of the passengers killed in the crash of Ethiopian Airlines Flight 302.

== Early life and education ==
Alalo was born in 1970 to Stanley Etori and Jane Apubo in Kalaki, Kaberamaido District. She studied at Moroto Municipal Council Primary School up to Primary Five. She moved to Teso where she completed her primary level at Swairia Primary School, Soroti District in 1985. She joined Tororo Girls' School for O Levels and later joined Immaculate Heart Girls' Secondary School, in Rukungiri District.

== Career ==
Alalo joined Uganda Police in 2001 as a cadet after graduating from Makerere University. She served as head of the Department of Child and Family Protection Unit in the Uganda National Police. She had served with the United Nations Mission in South Sudan as a Police Advisor in Juba Sector from 2007 to 2009. She was appointed Deputy Police Commissioner on 9 June 2015 succeeding Mr. Benson Oyo-Nyeko. At the time of her death, she held the rank of acting Police Commissioner under African Union Mission in Somalia (AMISOM), serving in Mogadishu, Somalia.

== Awards ==
- 2014 - EU Human Rights Defenders Award

== Death ==
On 10 March 2019, Alalo was among 157 people on board Ethiopian Airlines Flight 302, a Boeing 737 MAX 8, registration number ET-AVJ 302 that crashed at Bishoftu, 60 kilometres (37 mi) south of Ethiopia's capital city Addis Ababa. The flight was heading to Jomo Kenyatta International Airport in Nairobi, Kenya's capital city.

All 157 people on board were killed in the crash. On Monday, 11 March 2019, Uganda Police confirmed Alalo's death in an official statement.
