= Charity Bainababo =

Ugandan general (born 1975)

Brigadier Charity Bainababo
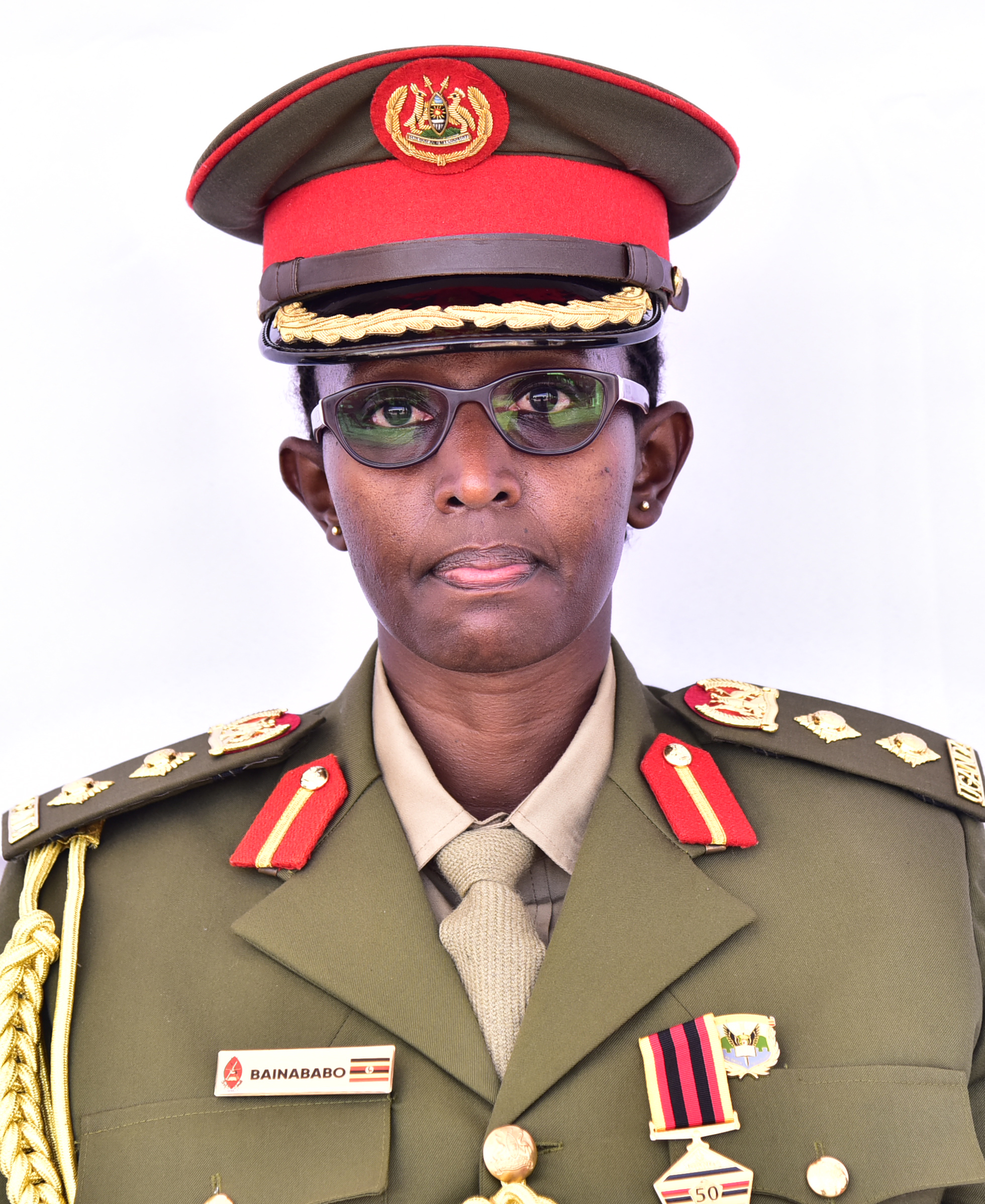
- Born: 1975 (age 50–51); Uganda
- Citizenship: Ugandan
- Education: Nkumba University; Uganda Management Institute; Makerere University; Uganda Special Forces School; Uganda Military Academy; Uganda Senior Command and Staff College; Uganda National Defence College
- Years active: 1998–present
- Known for: Military matters
- Title: Member of Parliament Representing Uganda People's Defence Forces in the 11th Parliament (2021–2026) & Former Deputy Commander of the Uganda Special Forces Command.

Brigadier Charity Bainababo is a Ugandan military officer, legislator and former policewoman. She is the immediate past deputy commander of the Uganda Special Forces Command, the special military unit of the UPDF responsible for presidential and first family security. She also represents the Uganda People's Defence Force (UPDF) in the 11th Ugandan parliament (2021 – 2026).

== Early life and education ==
Bainababo is a Ugandan national. She was born in 1975. She attended Kako Primary School, in Masaka District, then St. Charles Lwanga Girls Secondary School in Kalungu District, for her O-Level education. She completed her A-Level education at Progressive Secondary School.

She holds a Bachelor of Business Administration in marketing, from Nkumba University. She also has a Postgraduate Diploma in Information Systems Management and a Master's in Information Systems Management, both awarded by the Uganda Management Institute. Her second master's degree is the Master's Degree in Defence and Security Studies, obtained from Makerere University.

== Military training ==
She joined the Uganda military in 1998. She underwent boot camp at Kabamba in Mubende District. She then underwent the Cadet Training Course at the Uganda Special Forces School, in Kaweweta in Nakaseke District. She then attended the Company Commander Course at the Uganda Military Academy. Later, she attended the Senior Command Course at the Uganda Senior Command and Staff College, graduating in 2017.

In June 2024, Bainababo at the rank of Brigadier General was admitted to the Uganda National Defence College at Njeru in Buikwe District to pursue further training.

== Career ==
Bainababo was a member of the Presidential Police Guard Unit (PPG), a component of the SFC. In that capacity, Bainababo served as the Aide-de-camp (ADC) and head of security of Uganda's first lady and minister of Education Janet Kataha Museveni. She later rose to the position of Commander of the PPG. In 2021 she was promoted from the rank of Lieutenant Colonel to Colonel in an exercise where 1,393 UPDF men and women were promoted. In April 2022 she was promoted from the rank of Colonel to that of Brigadier and was appointed as the deputy commander of the SFC, the first woman to serve in that position.

In January 2021 she was among the 20 UPDF officers (16 men and 4 women) who were nominated for election to the 11th Ugandan parliament. At the rank Lieutenant Colonel, Bainabo was one of the three women who were elected to represent the UPDF.

In the 11th Ugandan Parliament (2021 - 2026), Bainababo was elected as the Dean of UPDF Parliamentary Caucus.

== Personal life ==
She is a mother of two sons.

== See also ==
- Victor Nekesa
- Flavia Byekwaso
