= National Defence College, Uganda =

Ugandan military school

- Njeru, Buikwe District in Uganda

Site information
- Type: Military School
- Owner: Uganda People's Defence Force
- Controlled by: UPDF
- Open to the public: Not yet

Location
- Location of National Defence College, Uganda, in Njeru.
- Coordinates: 00°26′06″N 33°10′23″E

Site history
- Built: July 2021
- Built by: Uganda People's Defence Force Engineers
- In use: Since December 2021
- Fate: Operational

Garrison information
- Current commander: Brigadier General; Alex Opolot Olupot
- Past commanders: Major General Francis Okello

Airfield information
- Elevation: 1,140 m (3,740 ft) AMSL

National Defence College, Uganda is a National Security and Strategic Studies training and educational institution in Uganda.

== Location ==
The college is located in Njeru, in Buikwe District. This is near the city of Jinja, approximately 81 kilometres (50 mi), by road, east of Kampala, Uganda's capital and largest city.

== Overview ==
The Defence College is expected to produce graduates in strategic leadership to government on national and international security matters. It is intended to be an institute of excellence on defence, security and national development.

In September 2018, the Ugandan Chief of Defence Forces, General David Muhoozi, established a committee to spearhead the establishment of the defence college in 2019. The committee was chaired by Lieutenant General Nakibus Lakara, the Commander of the Uganda Rapid Deployment Capability Centre (URDCC), based in Jinja. Lydia Wanyoto, a Ugandan lawyer, politician and diplomat, was one of the committee members.

According to the army commander, the National Defence College will offer training to civilians, military, national security professionals and future leaders. The training is intended to educate the students about the strategic security environment and the management of complexities at a strategic level. At this time, the UPDF has a sufficient number of senior officers, with the requisite knowledge, experience and background information to become instructors at the defence college.

The NDCU admitted its first cohort of students, numbering about 20, in January 2022. The students are first-star generals (Brigadier), senior military commanders (Colonel) and high ranking government personnel.

The College is affiliated with Makerere University, Uganda's oldest and largest public university. Graduates will receive a National Defence Collège badge and a master's degree, awarded by Makerere University.

== Courses ==
As of January 2022, the college offers two courses (a) Postgraduate Diploma in National Security Studies and (b) Masters in Security Strategy, offered in collaboration with Makerere University.

== Leadership ==
The pioneer commandant was Major General Francis Okello, from 2022 until 2025. Upon retirement, he was replaced by Brigadier General Alex Opolot Olupot in April 2025.

== Pioneer class ==
Members of the pioneer class at NDCU (2022), include Brigadier Flavia Byekwaso, previously spokesperson for the UPDF. Others are Colonel Edith Nakalema, previously Head of State House Anti Corruption Unit (SHACU), and Brigadier Peter Candia, previously Commander of the Special Forces Command (SFC). There were 18 UPDF officers in the pioneer class. The second cohort of officers, numbering 21, graduated in June 2024.

== Alumni ==
Prominent alumni include:

- Colonel Edith Nakalema
- Brigadier Flavia Byekwaso
- Brigadier Charity Bainababo

== See also ==
- Uganda Senior Command and Staff College
- Uganda Military Academy
- Uganda Military Engineering College
- List of military schools in Uganda
- List of universities in Uganda
