= William Leslie Amanzuru =

Ugandan activist

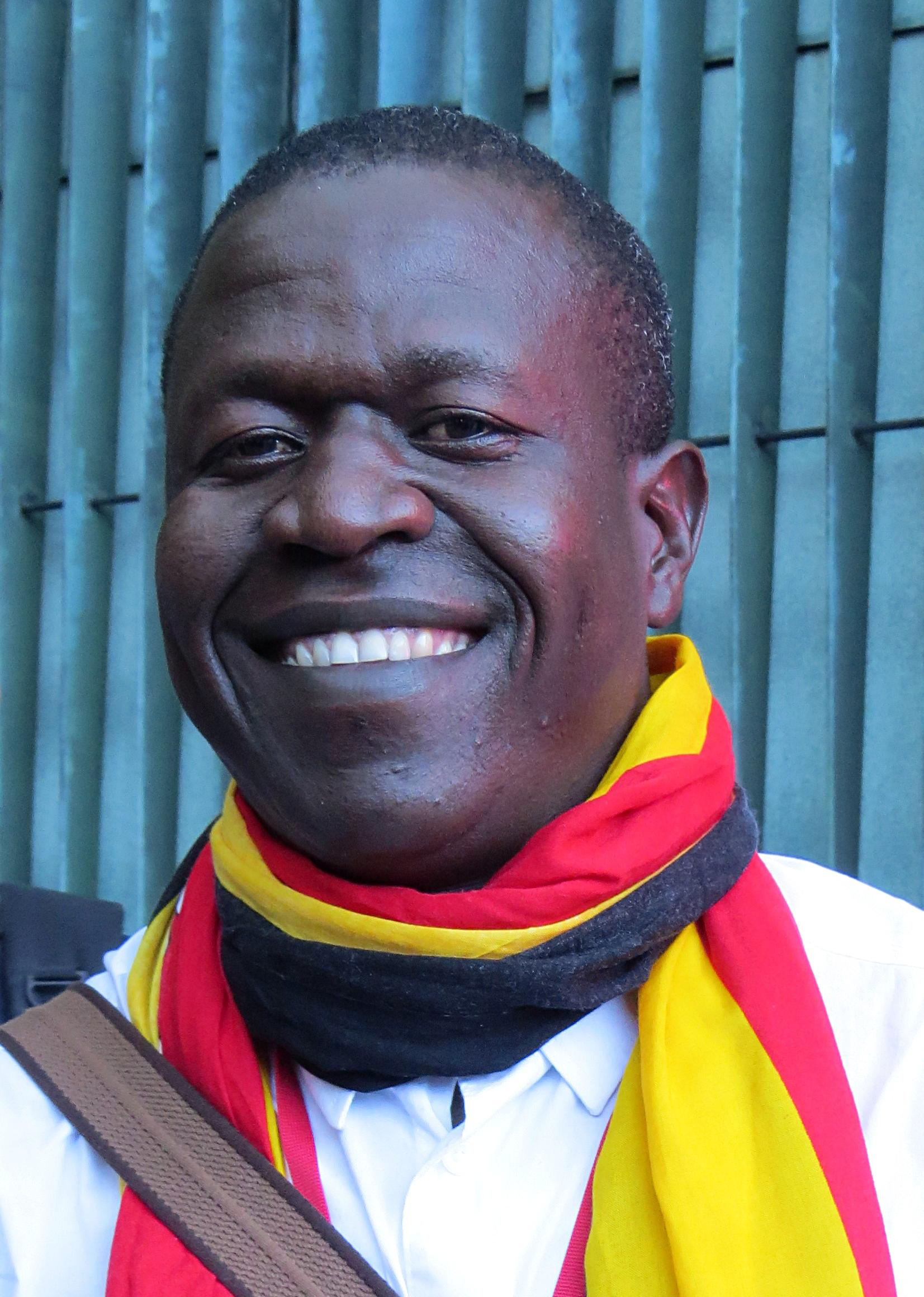
- William Leslie Amanzuru at Oslo Freedom Forum 2019
- Known for: environmental human rights activist

William Leslie Amanzuru is a Ugandan environmental human rights activist and team leader of Friends of Zoka in Uganda.

== Background ==
A Ma'di born in Lira District in north western Uganda, Amanzuru grew in the Area around Zoka forest a forest reserve in West Nile, Uganda.

== Career ==
Troubled by illegal exploitation of the forest resources, Amanzuru decided to do something to ensure that Zoka forest is preserved. In 2015, Amanzuru together with the community founded a group called "Friends of Zoka", a group of environmental activists that love Zoka central forest reserve to stop illegal plundering of the reserve by illegal loggers, timber dealers and charcoal dealers.

At the onset of the friends of Zoka, the group coordinated their activities on a Whatsapp to track loggers and inform each other in case of any activity that warranted action.

Amanzuru met stiff resistance from powerful Uganda army and police officers who were complacent in the illegal timber trade. He faced death threats, break ins at his home and has had to move his family 500 km away in search of safety.

He and other activists have organized events to sensitize the public about the dangers of climate change. In 2019 they organized a 470 km walk to save Zoka forest, the walk started from Kampala, the capital city of Uganda, up to Zoka forest in Adjumani district and lasted for 15 days.

== Awards ==
Amanzuru was the recipient of the European Union human rights Defenders Award 2019 in Uganda for his work that focuses on environmental protection and climate justice.
