= Alex Onzima =

Ugandan politician (born 1952)

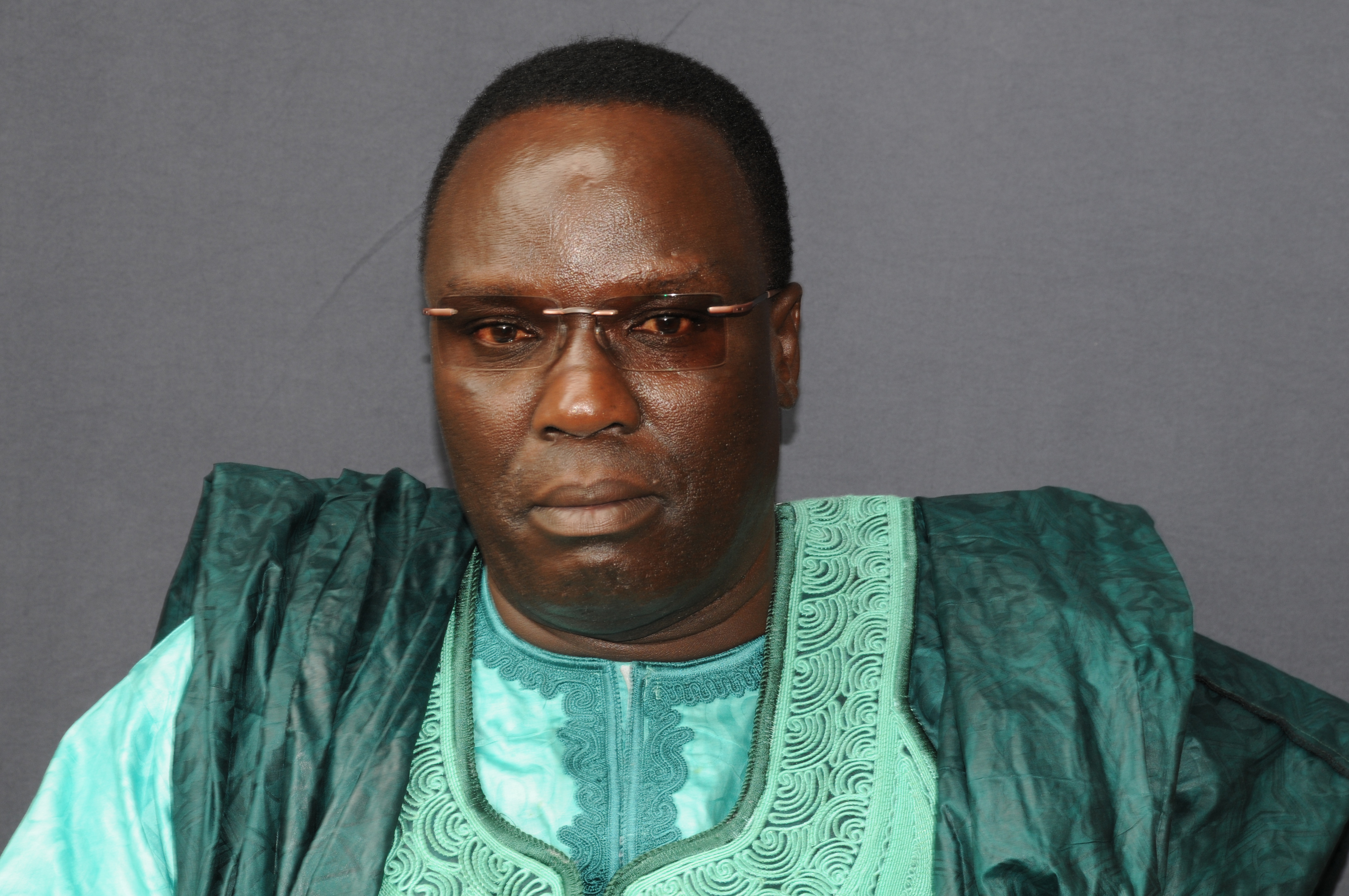
- Born: Alex Aadroa Onzima; 26 June 1952 (age 74); Uganda
- Education: Makerere University (BSc in Public Health Dentistry)
- Occupation: Politician
- Years active: 1990–present
- Known for: Politics
- Title: State Minister in the Office of the Vice President

Alex Aadroa Onzima is a Ugandan politician. He was the State Minister in the Office of the Vice President in the Ugandan cabinet. He was appointed to that position on 6 June 2016. Prior to that from 27 May 2011 until 6 June 2016, he served as the State Minister for Local Government. He replaced Perez Ahabwe. Onzima also served as the elected member of parliament, representing Maracha County, Maracha District in the 9th Parliament (2011 to 2016).

== Background and education ==
Onzima was born in Maracha District, West Nile sub-region, Northern Region on 26 June 1952. He attended local schools before he entered Makerere University, where he studied public health dentistry from 2002 until graduating in 2005 with a Bachelor of Science.

== Work history ==
Onzima has represented Maracha County in Uganda's parliament since 1996. From 1996 until 2004, he was part of the no-party system in the country. In 2004, when the Forum for Democratic Change (FDC) was created, he joined it. In 2010, he formally left FDC and joined the ruling National Resistance Movement. However, in the 2011 parliamentary elections, there were media reports that he intended to run as an independent candidate. In the cabinet created after the 2011 national elections, Onzima was appointed Minister of State for Local Government. In the cabinet list released on 6 June 2016, he was named State Minister in the Office of the Vice President.

== See also ==
- Cabinet of Uganda
- Parliament of Uganda
- West Nile sub-region
- List of political parties in Uganda
