= Jude T Lubega =

Ugandan professor of information technology

Jude T. Lubega
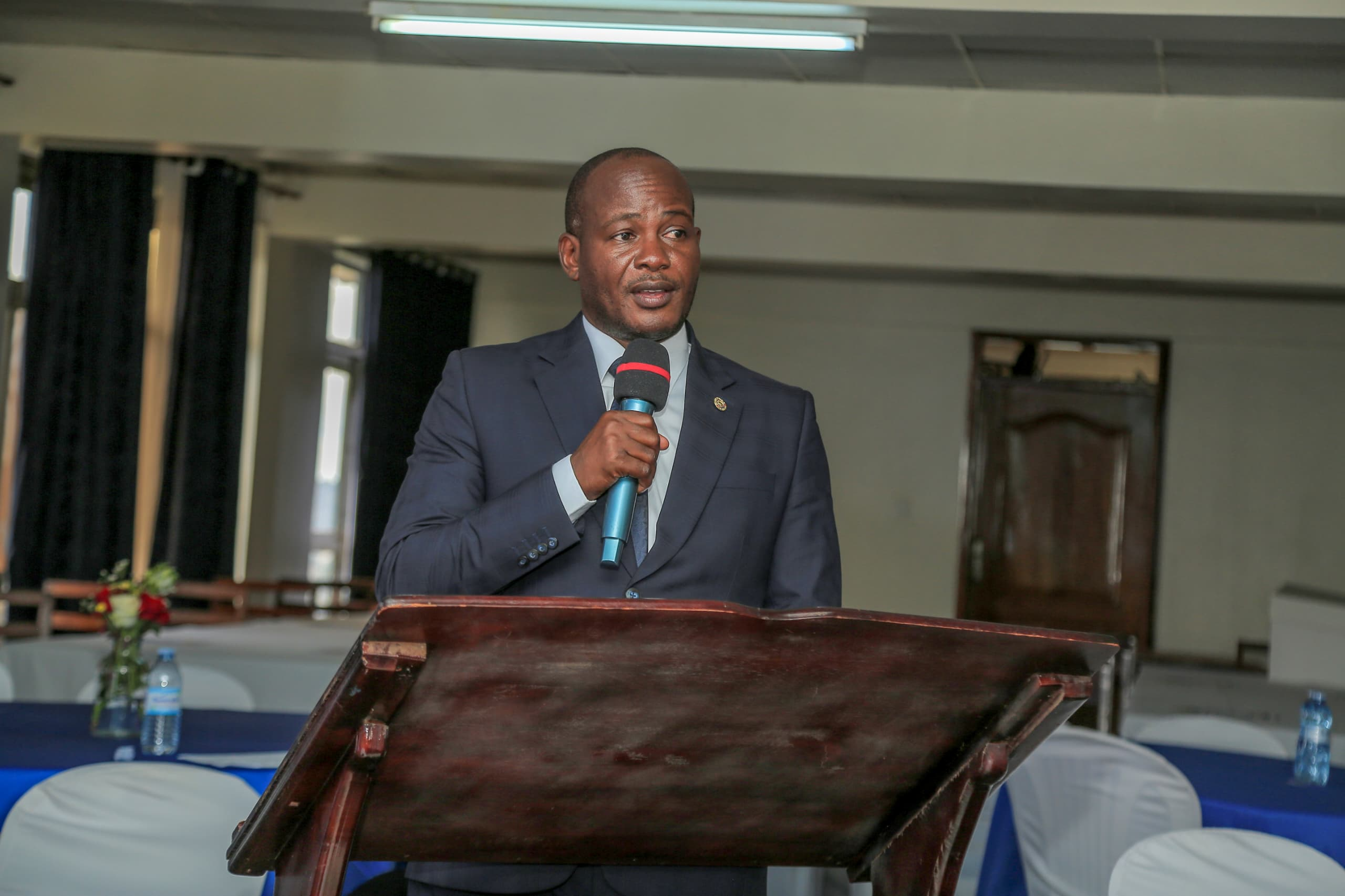
- Official portrait, 2026
- Born: 6 July 1974 (age 52); Kasese, Kilembe Mines Hospital Uganda
- Citizenship: Uganda
- Education: Uganda Martyrs University; Bachelors Degree in Computer Science; University of Reading; Masters Degree in Network Centered Computing, Ph.D. in Computer Science
- Years active: 1987 – present
- Known for: ICT4D
- Title: Vice Chancellor; Nkumba University
- Website: judelubega.com

Jude T Lubega, (born 6 July 1974) is a Ugandan professor of information technology and the current vice chancellor of the Nkumba University, one of the first private Universities to open up in Uganda.He previously served as the Acting Vice-Chancellor of Nkumba University from January 2020, and officially installed as the Vice Chancellor in 2021.

== Background and education ==
Lubega was born in Kasese, Kirembe Mines Hospital in the Western Region of the country. He attended Nyenga Seminary for his O-Level education and Rubaga boys for his A-Level education. He gained a PhD in Computer Science in December 2006, an MSc in Net Work Centered Computing in December 2002 at the University Reading in the UK, a BSc in Computer Science and Statistics from Uganda Martyrs University (UMU), and a certificate in Human Resource and Management.

== Career ==
Lubega served at Makerere University from 2007 to 2012 as the Deputy Dean and the Head of the Information Technology Department in the College of Computing and Information Sciences. He also served as the Deputy Vice Chancellor of Uganda Technology and Management University from 2013 to 2019. He is the chief executive officer for Eight Tech Consults, an ICT and management consulting company in Uganda.

He is an experienced ICT4D consultant and has undertaken numerous researches and projects both nationally and internationally. He is formerly a researcher and lecturer in the School of Systems Engineering at the University of Reading, United Kingdom.

His research interests include tracking and assessment in e-learning, content authoring, multimedia, multi-agent systems, data warehousing, knowledge representation, ICT for development (e-governance, e-health, e-agriculture), mobile computing, ICT strategic planning and management, web-based systems and mobile learning. He has published widely in journals, books and conference proceedings.

== Membership to professional and academic organizations ==
- Member of the British Computer Society - 2006
- Member of the ACM – 2009
- Secretary to Kampala ACM Chapter – 2010/2011
- Chair for the Kampala ACM Chapter - 2011/2012
- Member of the E-Learning Guild
- Charter Member of the Rotary Club of Namasuba

== Scholarly work ==
Lubega has participated in extensive research work and has presented numerous papers at local and international conferences and published several articles in internationally reviewed journals and books.

=== Journal articles ===
1. Namwano, S., Lubega, J.T., Mirembe, D.P., Damalie, A. (2024). Analysis of existing landslide early detection and warning systems “a case of Bududa District, Uganda. Discov Geosci 2, 59.
2. Mpirirwe, H., Mirembe, D.P., Lubega, J.T., Agaba, J., Nanyonga Clarke, R. (2024). A Multifactor Authentication Framework for Usability in Education Sectors in Uganda. In: Sharma, N., Goje, A.C., Chakrabarti, A., Bruckstein, A.M. (eds) Data Management, Analytics and Innovation. ICDMAI 2024. Lecture Notes inNetworks and Systems, vol 997. Springer, Singapore. https://doi.org/10.1007/978–981–97–3242–5_15
3. Mpirirwe, H; Mirembe, D.P.; Lubega, J.T. and. Agaba, J.E. (2021). E-learning platforms and security mechanisms used by educational institutions in Kampala, Uganda. International Journal of Information Technology, Communications andConvergence, 4 (1), 47-62.
4. Mugisha, A. K., Lubega, J. T., Kasujja, J. P. and Atuhaire, S (2021). A Systematic Review of Adaptable ICT Teaching Strategies on Teaching Process in Primary Teachers’ Colleges in Africa. Journal of the National Council for Higher Education, 9 (2), 54 – 64.
5. Mirembe, DP., Lubega, J.T. and Kibukamusoke, M. (2020). Using ICTs to enhance duty bearer accountability and transparency to citizens in Eastern and Northern Uganda. International Journal of Information Technology, Communications and Convergence, 3 (3), 228-243.
6. Basheka, B. C. Byamugisha, A and Lubega, J. T. (2017) Towards a Model for Assessing Performance of Public Sector Organisations (PSOs) in Uganda – A Rapid Assessment. Administratio Publica Vol 25 No 2 June 2017.pp. 139 – 161. ISSN 1015-4833
7. Ayoo, P. O and Lubega, J. T. (2014). A Framework for e-Learning Resources Sharing (FeLRS), International Journal of Information and Education Technology, (IJIET), Vol. 4, No. 1, pp. 112 – 119
