= Doreen Kabareebe =

Ugandan fashion model, socialite, branding coach and social media influencer

- Born: Doreen Kabareebe; 25 December 1990 (age 35); Rwampara District, Uganda
- Education: Nkumba University
- Occupations: Fashion model, socialite, branding coach and social media influencer
- Father: Amon Muzoora
- Awards: 2013 Best outstanding model at the style and fashion awards, Humanitarian Act Award from Startqt Awards in 2019

Doreen Kabareebe (born 25 December 1990) is a Ugandan fashion model, socialite, branding coach and social media influencer. She was one of the contestants in the Miss Uganda beauty pageant in 2010.

== Background and education ==
Born in 1990, Kabareebe is daughter of former Rwampara district MP Hon Amon Muzoora(RIP). She attended Entebbe Kindergarten for nursery school, Lakeside Academy for primary school. She thereafter joined Wanyange Girls School for both O and A'level. Kabareebe graduated with a bachelor's degree in Public Administration from Nkumba University in 2012.

She later on pursued a Master of Arts degree in International Relations and Diplomacy and graduated in 2016 from the same university.

== Career ==
Kabareebe's first job was managing the tennis complex at Lugogo while at University. Still at University, Kabareebe joined the contest for Miss Uganda in 2010. Though she didn't win, this opened doors for her in fashion and modeling industry.

She was awarded the Miss Uganda World international 2020 title on August 24, 2020.

In 2021, Kabareebe won other East African contestants in a competition to represent East Africa at the Miss World international beauty pageant. and in August 2022, Kabareebe won the miss world international woman title at the miss world international beauty pageant.

She was also honored as an international outstanding model at the international Photo Arena (IPA) Awards in Ghana, for her impact that changed the idea of modeling and how she has encouraged young models.

== Personal life ==
Kabareebe has stated that she is a virgin and has never been kissed. She has also said that she will never have sex before marriage.

She is married to Corey Harris, an American from Maryland.

== Awards ==
In 2013, she was voted the best outstanding model at the style and fashion awards.

She also won the Humanitarian Act Award from Startqt Awards in 2019. In 2021, at the Zikomo Awards, Kabareebe was awarded the Best African Model and Best Humanitarian Awards.

== See also ==
- Miss Uganda
- Ugandan Americans
