= Grace Kwiyucwiny =

Ugandan politician

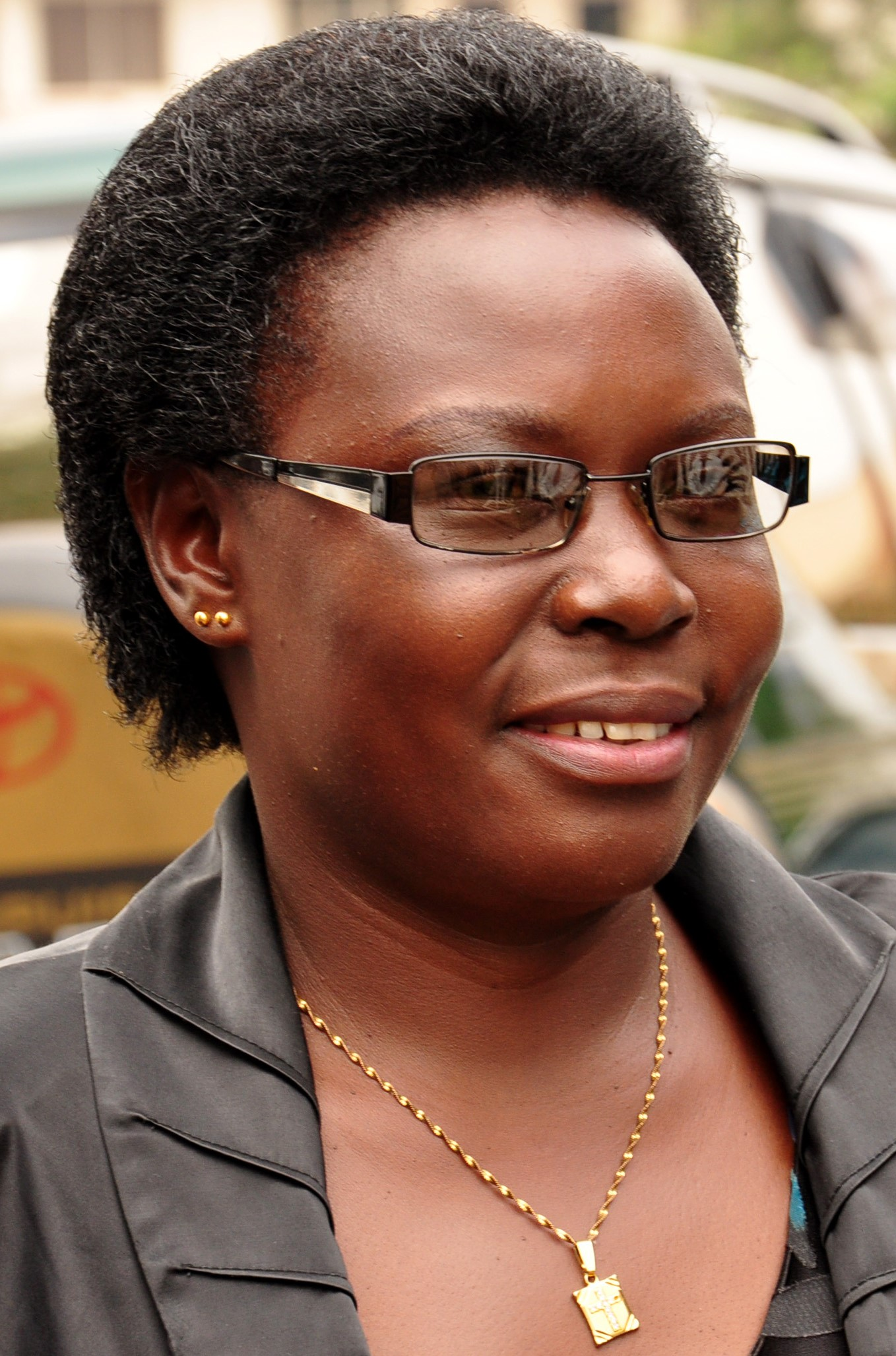
- Kwiyucwiny Grace Freedom
- Born: Zombo District
- Other name: Grace Freedom Kwiyucwiny
- Citizenship: Uganda
- Education: Lower Zombo Primary School Olevel at Warr Girls School; Tororo Girls School</be> Bachelor of Arts in Social Science, Postgraduate Diploma in Management and a Master of Business Administration at Makerere University

Grace Freedom Kwiyucwiny, also Grace Kwiyucwiny, is a Ugandan politician who served as the State Minister for Northern Uganda in the Ugandan Cabinet. She was appointed to that position on 6 June 2016. She also served as the woman Member of Parliament representing the Zombo District.

== Early life and education ==
She was born in Zombo District, West Nile sub-region, in the Northern Region of Uganda. She attended Lower Zombo Primary School and Warr Girls School for her Uganda Certificate of Education(UCE), before transferring to Tororo Girls School for her Uganda Advanced Certificate of Education(UACE). She studied at Makerere University, graduating with a Bachelor of Arts in Social Science, a Postgraduate Diploma in Management and a Master of Business Administration.

== Career ==
She was an active community leader in her district, especially among women. She previously served as the chairperson of Nebbi women's community. She contested for the Nebbi Women's seat in parliament before and had lost. She contested again in Zombo District, after the two districts split and she won in 2011. She was re-elected in 2016. She lost in 2020 polls for Women's representative in the Parliament of Uganda for Zombo District. She was the first Woman Constituency Member of Parliament that Zombo District elected, since it was carved out of Nebbi District in 2009. On 6 June 2016, she was appointed State Minister for Northern Uganda.

== Duties ==
One of the tasks she was handed as State Minister for Northern Uganda, was her selection to the committee to investigate the alleged plunder of Zoka Forest in Adjumani District. The four-person team, was selected by Prime Minister Ruhakana Rugunda, and was chaired by Mary Karooro Okurut, the Cabinet Minister for General Duties in the Office of the Prime Minister then. Other members were Betty Amongi, the Minister for Lands, Housing and Urban Development then and Sam Cheptoris, the then Minister for Water and Environment.

== See also ==
- Cabinet of Uganda
- Parliament of Uganda
