= Zoka Forest =

Forest in Uganda

- East Moyo Wildlife Reserve
- Location within Uganda
- Location: Adjumani District, Northern Region, Uganda
- Nearest city: Adjumani
- Coordinates: 03°01′03″N 31°39′21″E
- Area: 1,259 ha (12.59 km^{2}) (Tropical Forest),10,000 ha (100 km^{2}) (Wildlife Reserve Area)
- Governing body: National Forestry Authority

Zoka Forest is a natural tropical rain forest in the Northern Region of Uganda. The forest is a component of the larger East Moyo Wildlife Reserve.

== Location ==
The forest is in the southern part of Adjumani District, approximately 50 kilometres (31 mi) south of Adjumani, the district capital. The coordinates of the forest are 03°01'03.0"N, 31°39'21.0"E (Latitude:3.017500; Longitude:31.655830).

== Overview ==
Situated in the Itirikwa and Ukusijoni sub-counties in the southern part of Adjumani District, the Zoka Central Forest Reserve measures about 1,259 hectares (4.86 mi^{2}). It is the only natural tropical rain forest and the only natural forest resource in Adjumani District.

== Conflicting interests ==
=== Prime minister's investigation ===
In August 2016, Prime Minister Ruhakana Rugunda launched an investigation into the plundering of the Zoka Forest. The four-person team is led by Mary Karooro Okurut, the Minister for General Duties in the Office of the Prime Minister. Other team members include Lands, Housing and Urban Development Minister Betty Amongi, Minister of Water and Environment Sam Cheptoris, and Minister of State for Northern Uganda Grace Kwiyucwiny.

=== UPDF vs NFA ===
The National Forestry Authority (NFA) has in the past accused members of the Uganda People's Defence Force (UPDF) of illegally felling trees in the forest reserve and using UPDF trucks to transport the logs out of the forest. In October 2016, the resident commissioner of the Ajumani District told a press conference that she had photographs of UPDF trucks doing this. The trucks were followed to the Pabbo Army Detach in Amuru District, which is under the command of the 4th Division of the UPDF, headquartered in Gulu. The UPDF has mounted an investigation led by the 4th Division Commander, Brigadier Kayanja Muhanga.

=== Cabinet ministers disagree ===
On 4 October 2016, State Minister of Lands Persis Namuganza called a press conference to announce plans to de-gazette part of the Zoka Forest to allow the Madhvani Group to grow sugarcane in the area and relieve the contract farmers in the Busoga sub-region. The contract farmers in Busoga are starving because they neglected to grow food for their own sustenance and instead planted sugarcane.

The plan evoked immediate outrage from environmental groups, Friends of ZOKA, headed by William Leslie Amanzuru a dedicated environmentalist, the NFA, politicians, and concerned citizens. Deputy Prime Minister Moses Ali, a member of parliament from the Adjumani District, called an impromptu meeting in which Minister of Lands, Housing and Urban Development Betty Amongi disowned the plan announced by Namuganza, her junior minister.

== See also ==
- Central Forest Reserves of Uganda
