= Faith Alupo =

Ugandan politician (1983–2020)

Member of Parliament
- In office 2018–2020
- Preceded by: Agnes Ameede
- Constituency: Pallisa District (Women's Representative)

Personal details
- Born: 9 October 1983 Uganda
- Died: 15 September 2020 (aged 36) Kampala, Uganda
- Cause of death: Complications arising from COVID-19
- Party: National Resistance Movement
- Occupation: Social worker, politician

Faith Alupo (9 October 1983 – 15 September 2020) was a Ugandan politician who served as a Member of Parliament, representing the Pallisa District. She was elected to that position in June 2018.

Alupo was declared and confirmed the new Member of Parliament for Pallisa district under the ruling National Resistance Movement party after Achola Catherine Osupelem, the Forum for Democratic Change (FDC) Woman Member of Parliament Candidate for Pallisa district was disqualified by the electoral commission from the race for using nomination names that did not tally with those on her academic qualification. This was communicated in a letter dated 14 July, signed by Justice Simon Byamukama.

== Background and education ==
Alupo was married and had a professional background in social work. In 1997, she completed her Primary Leaving Examinations at Pallisa Girls Primary School. In 2001, Alupo attained her Uganda Certificate of Education at Pal and Lsa College. In 2003, she obtained a Uganda Advanced Certificate at MM College Wairaka. She completed her bachelor's degree in social work and social administration at Uganda Christian University, Mukono in 2007. After four years (in 2011), she joined Law Development Centre, Kampala and attained a Certificate in Law.

== Career history ==
Between 2007 and 2008, she began her first job as a field worker at the Office of Probation found in Makindye Division. From 2008 to 2009, she worked as the field interviewer at Uganda Bureau of Statistics. From 2010 to 2011, she started working at the Sub-County level as the Election Officer at Electoral Commission, Pallisa.

=== Member of parliament ===
In 2018, the Ugandan government effected a split of the Pallisa District, creating the Butebo District from part of its territory. The incumbent woman member of the Parliament of Uganda for the district, Agnes Ameede, decided to remain as representative for Butebo, leaving the position of Pallisa woman MP vacant. Alupo won the nomination of the ruling National Resistance Movement (NRM) for the seat on 28 May 2018, garnering 34,580 votes in the primary election compared with 26,995 and 11,058 retrospectively, for her nearest rivals Kevin Kaala Ojinga and Josephine Ibaseret. The by-election itself was scheduled for 28 June. Five candidates were in the running for the seat, but three withdrew, leaving just Alupo and Forum for Democratic Change (FDC) candidate Catherine Achola in the race. Both candidates were ratified by the Electoral Commission of Uganda on 5 June, but on 19 June the commission announced that Achola was disqualified due to a discrepancy between her nomination papers and the academic records provided.

From 2018 to 2020, she served as a Member of Parliament at the Parliament of Uganda.

== Death ==
She died 15 September 2020 at Mulago Hospital, where she had been receiving treatment for blood pressure and diabetes. COVID-19, during the COVID-19 pandemic in Uganda, was suspected, because she had problems with breathing. On 18 September, New Vision stated that Alupo died "while she was receiving treatment at Mulago National Referral Hospital in what sources say was a result of Covid-19 infection", twenty four days short of her 37th birthday.
