= Flavia Byekwaso =

Ugandan female military general

Brigadier Flavia Byekwaso
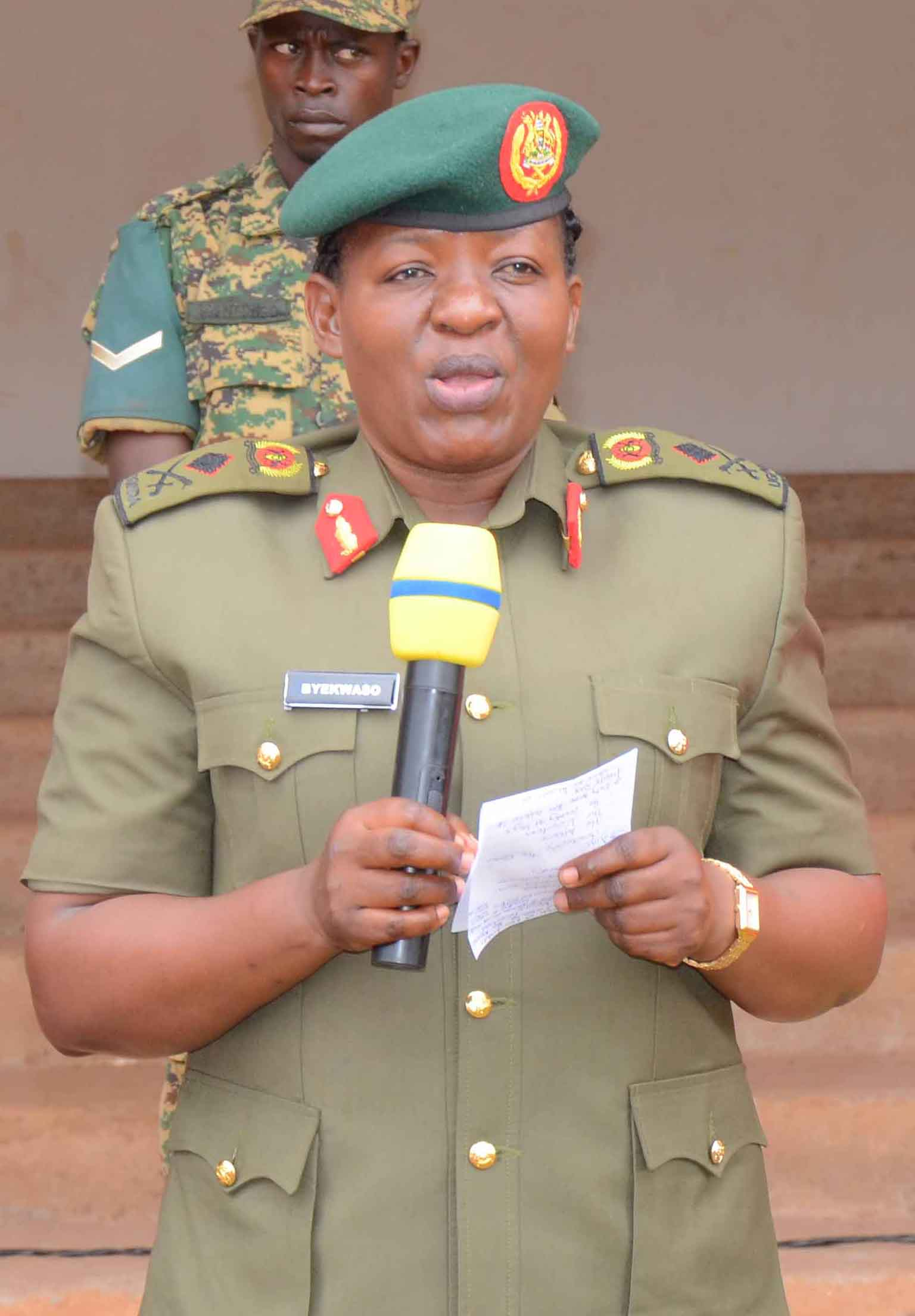
- Brig. Gen Flavia Byekwaso
- Born: 29 December 1971 (age 54); Uganda
- Citizenship: Uganda
- Education: St. Mathias Kalemba Senior Secondary School (High School Diploma); Makerere University (Bachelor of Business Administration (Master of Public Administration); Uganda National Defence College (Masters of Security Strategy)
- Years active: 2000–present
- Known for: Military matters
- Title: Chief of Staff of the Uganda Rapid Deployment Capability Center

Brigadier Flavia Byekwaso, is a Ugandan military officer, who served as an elected member of parliament representing the Uganda People's Defence Forces (UPDF) in the 10th Parliament (2016–2021). On 1 August 2020, she was appointed Spokesperson of the UPDF, replacing Brigadier Richard Karemire, who was transferred to the East African Community headquarters as the Defence Liaison Officer. In January 2022 she was dropped as UPDF spokesperson and sent for further training at the Uganda National Defence College.

Effective May 2023 she was appointed Chief of Staff of the Uganda Rapid Deployment Capability Center (URDCC), based at Gaddafi Barracks, in Jinja, Uganda.

== Background and education ==
She was born on 29 December 1971, in the Central Region of Uganda. She attended St. Mathias Kalemba Senior Secondary School, in Nazigo, Kayunga District, for both her O-Level and A-Level studies.

Her first degree, a Bachelor of Business Administration, was awarded by Makerere University, Uganda's oldest and largest public university in 1996. Later, in 2012, she obtained a Master of Public Administration and Management degree, also from Makerere University.

She was a member of the pioneer class to attend the Uganda National Defence College, entering in 2022 and graduating in 2023.

== Career ==
According to her biography at the website of the Ugandan parliament, Flavia Byekwaso was recruited by the Ugandan military in 2000, starting out as a protocol officer. Over time, she worked in different roles, including as a military assistant, as an administrative officer and as a logistics officer. She spent the years from 2014 until 2016 serving as the Director of Logistics in the Uganda People's Defence Forces.

In 2016, at the rank of lieutenant colonel, she was elected to be one of the ten military men and women who represented the UPDF in the 10th Parliament (2016–2021). In 2019, in a promotions exercise involving over 2,000 men and women in the UPDF, she was promoted from the rank of colonel to the rank of brigadier general. In that capacity, she was the second highest-ranking woman in the UPDF, behind Proscovia Nalweyiso, whose rank at that time was lieutenant general. In March 2016, the Daily Monitor reported that she had served in the past as part of the United Nations–African Union Mission in Darfur, Sudan.

== Personal life ==
Brigadier Flavia Byekwaso is married.

== See also ==
- Godard Busingye
