= Tororo Girls School =

Coordinates: 00°39′57″N 34°11′21″E

- Tororo, Tororo District; Uganda

Information
- Type: Public middle school and high school
- Motto: "Light for life"
- Established: 1960
- Head teacher: Principal
- Athletics: football, cricket, athletics, netball, volleyball, lawn tennis, table tennis, hockey
- Website: Homepage

Tororo Girls Secondary School, commonly known as Tororo Girls School (TGS), is an all-girls boarding school covering grades 8 -13 in the Eastern Region of Uganda.

== Location ==
TGS is in the town of Tororo, about 5 kilometres (3 mi) southeast of the town's central business district. This is appro 210 kilometres (130 mi), by road, east of Kampala, the capital and largest city of Uganda. The coordinates of the school campus are 0°39'57.0"N, 34°11'21.0"E (Latitude:0.665833; Longitude:34.189167).

== Notable alumni ==
Some of the notable women who have attended TGS include the following:

- Jennifer Musisi: Lawyer and administrator. First executive director of the Kampala Capital City Authority, from 2011 until 15 December 2018.
- Beatrice Wabudeya: Veterinary doctor, politician.
- Grace Freedom Kwiyucwiny: Politician. She is the State Minister for Northern Uganda in the Ugandan Cabinet.
- Ruth Doreen Mutebe: Accountant/Auditor. Head of Audit at Umeme Limited (2018–present).
- Esta Nambayo: Lawyer and judge.
- Christine Alalo: Peacekeeper.
- Rachael Magoola: Singer, songwriter and dancer.
- Agnes Ameede: Politician

== Notable faculty ==
- Namirembe Bitamazire: Former Minister of Education in the Cabinet of Uganda. She served as the principal of TGS from 1971 until 1974.

== See also ==
- Education in Uganda
- List of schools in Uganda
