= Nkumba University =

Private university in Uganda

Nkumba University (NKU)
- Motto: I Owe You
- Type: Private
- Established: 1994; 32 years ago
- Accreditation: Uganda National Council for Higher Education
- Chancellor: Emmanuel Katongole
- Vice-Chancellor: Jude T Lubega
- Administrative staff: 300+ (2014)
- Students: 10,000+ (2014)
- Location: Entebbe, Uganda; 00°05′42″N 32°30′27″E
- Campus: 18 acres (7.3 ha); Urban
- Website: Homepage
- Location within Uganda

Nkumba University (NKU) is a chartered private university in Uganda. It was established in 1994 as part of a group of schools and colleges that originally grew from a kindergarten established in 1951. The university is not affiliated with any particular religious organization, but it accommodates several religious associations.

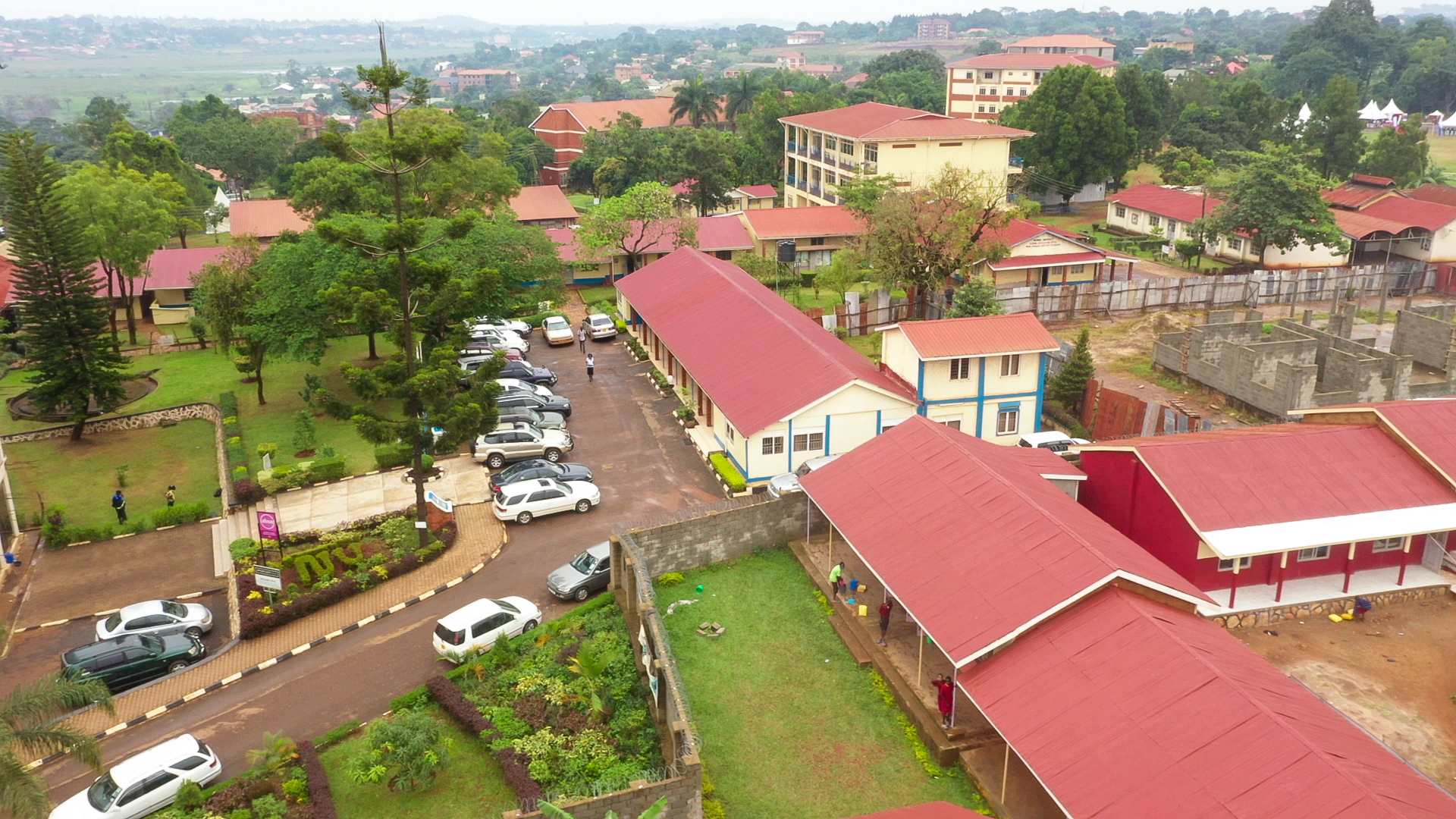
An aerial picture of Nkumba University's main campus.

== Location ==
The university campus is located on Nkumba Hill in Wakiso District, approximately 12 kilometres (7 mi), by road, north-east of Entebbe International Airport, along the northern shores of Lake Victoria, the second-largest freshwater body in the world. The coordinates of the university campus are 0°05'42.0"N, 32°30'27.0"E (Latitude:0.095000; Longitude:32.507500).

== Overview ==
The university is one of the largest private universities in East Africa. As of December 2011, the student body exceeded 7,000, with over 300 academic staff. Nkumba University is a private, non-denominational, non-profit and non-secular institution.

The university offers courses leading to certificates, diplomas, baccalaureate degrees as well as postgraduate academic qualifications. Nkumba University has graduated close to 30,000 students over the past 27 years. The university was one of the first universities in the country to introduce the Bachelor of Science degree in petroleum studies, mineral management, and technology. The inaugural intake occurred in 2011. A master's degree in the same field is in development.

== History ==
On 29 July 1951, Ssalongo Kintu a local merchant, invited two of his best friends to a meeting: Charles Kisitu Ffulu, the then Parish Chief of Nkumba, and Zefania Mpanga, a civil servant who resided in the area. Their meeting led to the establishment of a kindergarten for their infants. The school opened on 6 February 1952 with twelve pupils at Ffulu's home. Within two years, the student population had grown to over 150.

The kindergarten grew into a primary (elementary) school. Over the years, the school grew into a junior secondary (middle) school and a senior secondary (high) school in 1968. 1968 was just two years after the Mengo Crisis of 1966 and the school was on the verge of collapse with the Uganda government and landlord Nelson Nkalubo Ssebuggwaawo pulling ropes over declining student enrolment, when Paul Livisingstone Kisulo Mukasa one of the teachers popularly called "professor Mukasa" persuaded community elders including Kintu Ssalongo, Yolamu Kiwanuka, Christopher Ssempa, Badru Kasule, Engineer Mutyaabi Ngulumi, landlord Ssebuggwaawo and a handful of others to entrust him into reviving it. In 1969, the school became a vocational school. In 1974, the name of the school was changed to Nkumba College of Commerce and Advanced Studies by Education minister Al Hajji Abu Baker Kakyaama Mayanja during the first graduation ceremony when he declared, "This is not just a school, it is Nkumba College of Commerce and Advanced Studies", and donated 10 brand new manual typewriters. "Professor" Mukasa steered Nkumba for more than 25 high energy, high success years. Studies grew from secondary to London GCE, to secretarial to professional courses including accounting, statistics, business; to awarding the internal Diploma in Business Studies which until then was only available at Uganda College of Commerce, Nakawa. In 1994, the board of trustees were approved by the Ministry of Education to transform the college into a university. This marked the beginning of Nkumba University. On 16 February 2007, Nkumba University was granted a charter by the president of Uganda upon the recommendation of the National Council for Higher Education as provided in the Universities and Other Tertiary Institutions Act 2001.

== Academic Affairs ==
The academic affairs of Nkumba University are organized under seven constituent schools of the university.

- School of Business Administration and Information Technology
- School of Education, Humanities and Sciences
- School of Social Sciences
- School of Law and Institute of Criminal Justice
- School of Industrial, Commercial Art and Design
- School of Computing and Informatics
- School of Sciences.

== Sports Activities ==
- Represented Uganda in All Africa University Games, 2024 in Lagos, Nigeria.
- Champions of Women Football FASU Games 2026 in Cairo, Egypt to represent Africa at the 2028 International University Games in Brazil.

== Notable alumni ==
- Doreen Amule, Ugandan politician
- Charity Bainababo, Ugandan military officer
- Doreen Kabareebe, Fashion model
- Jeje Odongo, Minister of Foreign Affairs of Uganda
- Katumba Wamala, Ugandan military officer. Current Ugandan Minister of Works and Transport. Former Chief of Defense Forces, the highest military position in the Uganda People's Defence Force
- Mwanje Gideon, Ugandan lawyer. Former President of law students association of East Africa

== See also ==
- Education in Uganda
- List of universities in Uganda
- List of Business Schools in Uganda
- List of Ugandan university leaders
- Katumba Wamala
