= Victor Nekesa =

Ugandan physician, military officer and legislator

Colonel Victor Nekesa
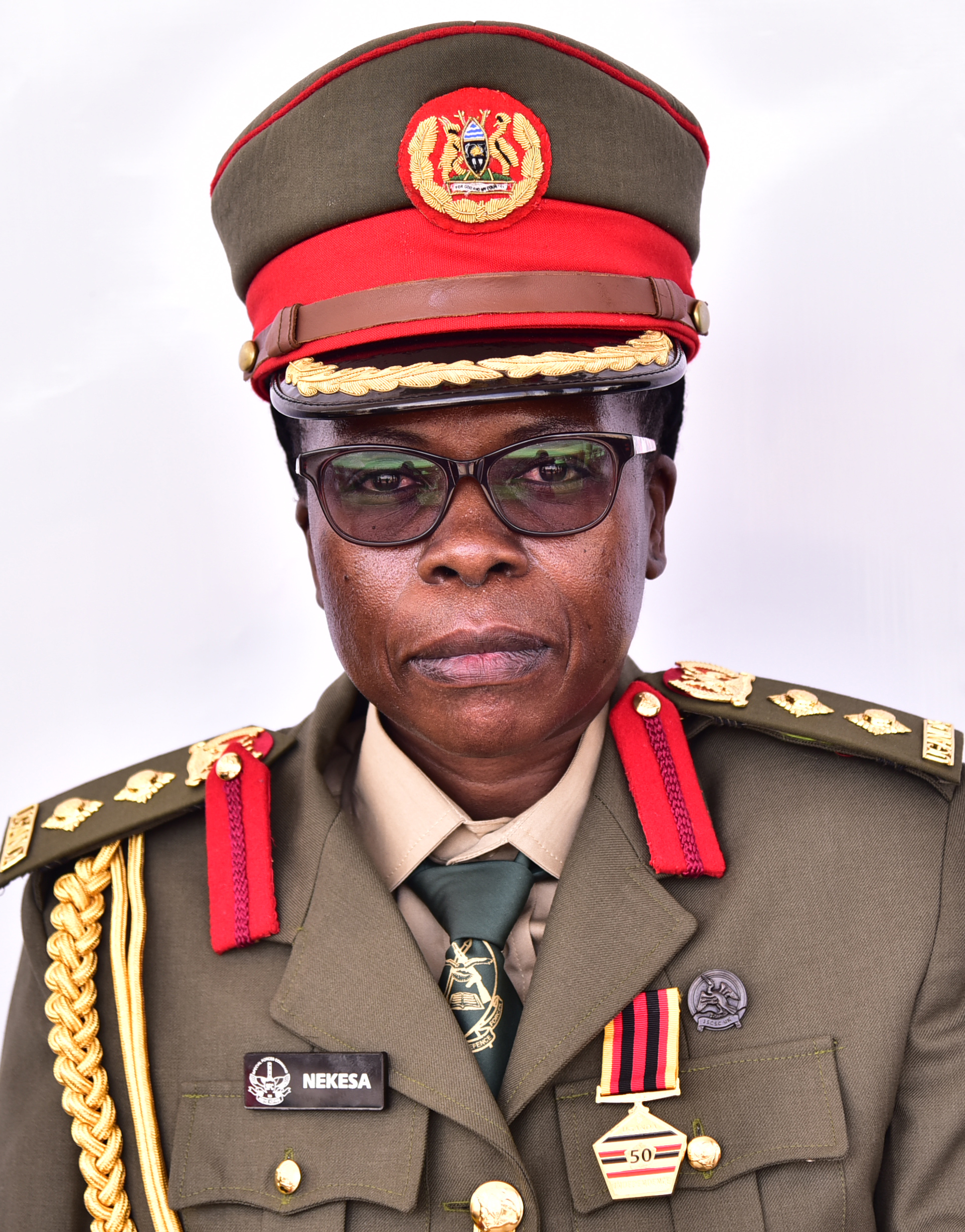

Member of Parliament representing the Uganda People's Defence Forces
- Incumbent
- Assumed office 2021
- Constituency: Uganda People's Defence Forces

Personal details
- Born: Uganda
- Citizenship: Uganda
- Party: Independent
- Profession: Physician, military officer, legislator
- Known for: Personal physician to President Yoweri Kaguta Museveni
- Committees: Committee on Health

Military service
- Branch/service: Uganda People's Defence Forces
- Rank: Colonel

Victor Nekesa is a Ugandan physician, military officer and legislator. She represents the Uganda People's Defense Forces (UPDF) in the parliament of Uganda.

== Background and education ==
Nekesa is a medical doctor by profession. She is also Uganda People's Defense forces (UPDF) officer at the rank of colonel.

She was voted into parliament alongside two other female UPDF officers including Charity Bainababo and Jennifer Alanyo by the defence council. Nekasa got the highest number of votes in the females category.

The defence council also nominated and voted seven men to represent the country's military in the parliament of Uganda.

== Career ==
Nekesa is a professional soldier and medical doctor. She is a personal physician of Yoweri Kaguta Museveni president of the republic of Uganda.

In parliament, Nekesa serves as a member of the health committee.

== See also ==
- Charity Bainababo
