= Godard Busingye =

- Born: Godard Busingye
- Education: Makerere University (LLD/PhD)
- Military career
- Allegiance: Uganda
- Branch: Ugandan Land Forces
- Rank: Brigadier General
- Unit: Uganda People's Defence Force (UPDF)
- Commands: Chief of Legal Services, Ministry of Defence and Veteran Affairs & UPDF
- Known for: Chief of Legal Services in the UPDF; senior military legal officer; academic contributions in land law, gender, and armed conflict

Godard Busingye is a Ugandan retired senior military officer of Uganda People's Defence Force(UPDF), Chief of Legal Services at the Ministry of Defence and Veteran Affairs and UPDF, and a legal scholar.

== Education ==
He holds a PhD in LLD from Makerere University, which made him the second LLD Student in the history of the School of Law, following Professor Ben Twinomugisha, who was the pioneer LLD student at the Law School Makerere University.

== Professional career ==
Godard retired from the Uganda People's Defence Forces in September 2024 while having the rank of Brigadier General. He attained the Brigadier General title as part of the twenty-nine Uganda People's Defence Forces (UPDF) officers who graduated after completing four weeks of training in the Advanced Brigade Legal Officers Course in 2017. He also served as UPDF's chief of legal services. Before his retirement, he was the Chief of Legal Services at the Ministry of Defence and Veteran Affairs and UPDF. As the Chief of Legal Services, he opened one of the dormitories. He was succeeded by the Brigadier General Moses Wandera, the Joint Staff Legal Services. Godard encouraged his successor during the handover to embrace teamwork and collaboration. However, before being the chief of legal services, he served as the Joint Staff Legal Services (JS LS) in the UPDF where he led a training at the Uganda People's Defence Forces’ (UPDF) Legal Training Centre (LTC) located at Gadaffi Barracks in Jinja District which empowered legal excellence with the graduation of 29 UPDF soldiers from the Advanced Brigade Legal Officers Course (ABLOC).

He served as the Associate Professor at Kampala International University before being promoted to Professor. He also served as a lecturer at the Faculty of Law, Uganda Christian University.

== Publications ==
- Politicisation of land law and gender relations in Uganda: a case study
- African feminism, land tenure and soil rights in Africa: a case of Uganda
- Collateral Damage During Armed Conflict: Inevitable or a Rule of the Game?
- No Peace, No War: Protection of Civilians in the Great Lakes Region of Africa
- Revisiting Impediments to Women's Land Decision-Making Processes in Uganda
- https://www.cambridge.org/core/books/abs/commentary-on-the-third-geneva-convention/acknowledgements/8D504C0EFEDAE3ACC386979DF56D8409

== See also ==
- Ministry of Defence and Veterans Affairs (Uganda)
