= Perez Ahabwe =

Ugandan economist and politician

- Born: 21 November 1961 (age 64); Uganda
- Citizenship: Uganda
- Education: Makerere University (Bachelor of Arts in economics) (Diploma in Education) (Master of Science in economics) (Doctor of Philosophy in agricultural economics)
- Occupations: Economist, politician
- Years active: 1986 — present
- Known for: Politics
- Title: State Minister for Local Government (2009–2011)

Perez Ahabwe is a Ugandan economist and politician who was the State Minister for Local Government in Uganda from 16 February 2009 to 27 May 2011. In the cabinet reshuffle of 27 May 2011, he was dropped from the cabinet and replaced by Alex Onzima. He also served as the elected member of Parliament, representing Rubanda County East, Kabale District, from 2001 to 2011, before losing to Henry Musasizi in the 2011 general election. On 7 June 2019, Ahabwe was appointed by Monica Azuba Ntege, Uganda's Minister of Works and Transport as the Chairman of the newly inaugurated Uganda Airlines National Company Board of Directors.

== Background and education ==
He was born on 21 November 1961, in Kabale District. Ahabwe holds a Bachelor of Arts degree from Makerere University, Uganda's oldest university. He also holds a postgraduate Diploma in Education from the same institution. His Master of Science degree in economics is from Makerere University as well. He is currently enrolled in the Doctor of Philosophy in agricultural economics program at Makerere University.

== Career ==
Since graduating from Makerere, he has worked in different positions in the private and public sectors. He has served as a consultant on the monitoring and evaluation of capacity-building programs in the Ugandan Ministry of Public Service. He has also served as a consultant on sixteen different agricultural research projects within the country. He has worked as a graduate research assistant at the Makerere Institute of Social Research (MISR). He has also worked as a lecturer at Makerere University.

In 2001, he joined politics and was elected to the Ugandan Parliament to represent Rubanda County East, Kabale District. He was re-elected to that seat in 2006. On 16 February 2009, he was named State Minister for Local Government, serving in that capacity until 27 May 2011. In the 2011 general election, he lost his seat to Musasizi, also of the National Resistance Movement political party.

== Other responsibilities ==
While in parliament, he sat on the Appointments Committee, which reviews presidential appointments to the cabinet and to the diplomatic services. He also chaired the parliamentary committee on Tourism, Trade and Industry.

== Personal information ==
Ahabwe is married. He belongs to the National Resistance Movement political party.
