= Doreen Amule =

Ugandan politician

- Born: 28 October 1982 (age 43); Amolatar District, Uganda
- Education: Islamic University in Uganda (Bachelors in Human Resource Management); Law Development Centre (Certificate in Administrative Law); Nkumba University (Master of Business Administration)
- Occupations: Politician, Administrator
- Years active: 2008–present
- Known for: Politics
- Title: Member of Parliament for Amolator District Women's Constituency

Doreen Ruth Amule, commonly known as Doreen Aumule, is a Ugandan politician and member of parliament, representing Amolatar District Women's Constituency, since 2017. She is a co-sponsor of the controversial parliamentary bill to scrap the age limits of the Ugandan president, as enshrined in the 1995 Ugandan Constitution.

== Background and education ==
She was born in Amolatar District, on 28 October 1982. She attended Masindi Secondary School between 1998 and 2001, for her O-Level education. She then went on to attend Wanale View Secondary School, in Mbale, for her A-Level education, from 2002 until 2003.

In 2004, she was admitted to the Islamic University in Uganda, graduating in 2007 with a Bachelors in Human Resource Management. In 2010, she attended the Law Development Centre in Kampala, graduating with a Certificate in Administrative Law. Later, in 2014, she graduated with a Master of Business Administration from Nkumba University.

== Work experience ==
In 2008, she began work as an assistant lecturer at Nile University at its Arua campus, serving in that capacity until 2009.

== Political career ==
In 2011, she was elected as a Councillor on the Amolatar District Local Government. In 2014, she was elected Chairperson of the Women Caucus in Amolatar District, serving in that capacity in 2016. During the same time-frame she served as the Vice President of the Network for Locally Elected Women of Africa (REFELA), and as Chairperson of the Ethics and Accountability Committee of the Uganda Local Government Association. From 2011 until 2016, she served as the Speaker of Amolatar District Local Council.

In 2016 she contested the parliamentary seat for Amolatar District Women's Constituency. She ran on the ruling National Resistance Movement political party's ticket. She won and is the incumbent.

== See also ==
- Evelyn Anite
