= Anna Ebaju Adeke =

Ugandan lawyer and politician

Anna Ebaju Adeke Honorable
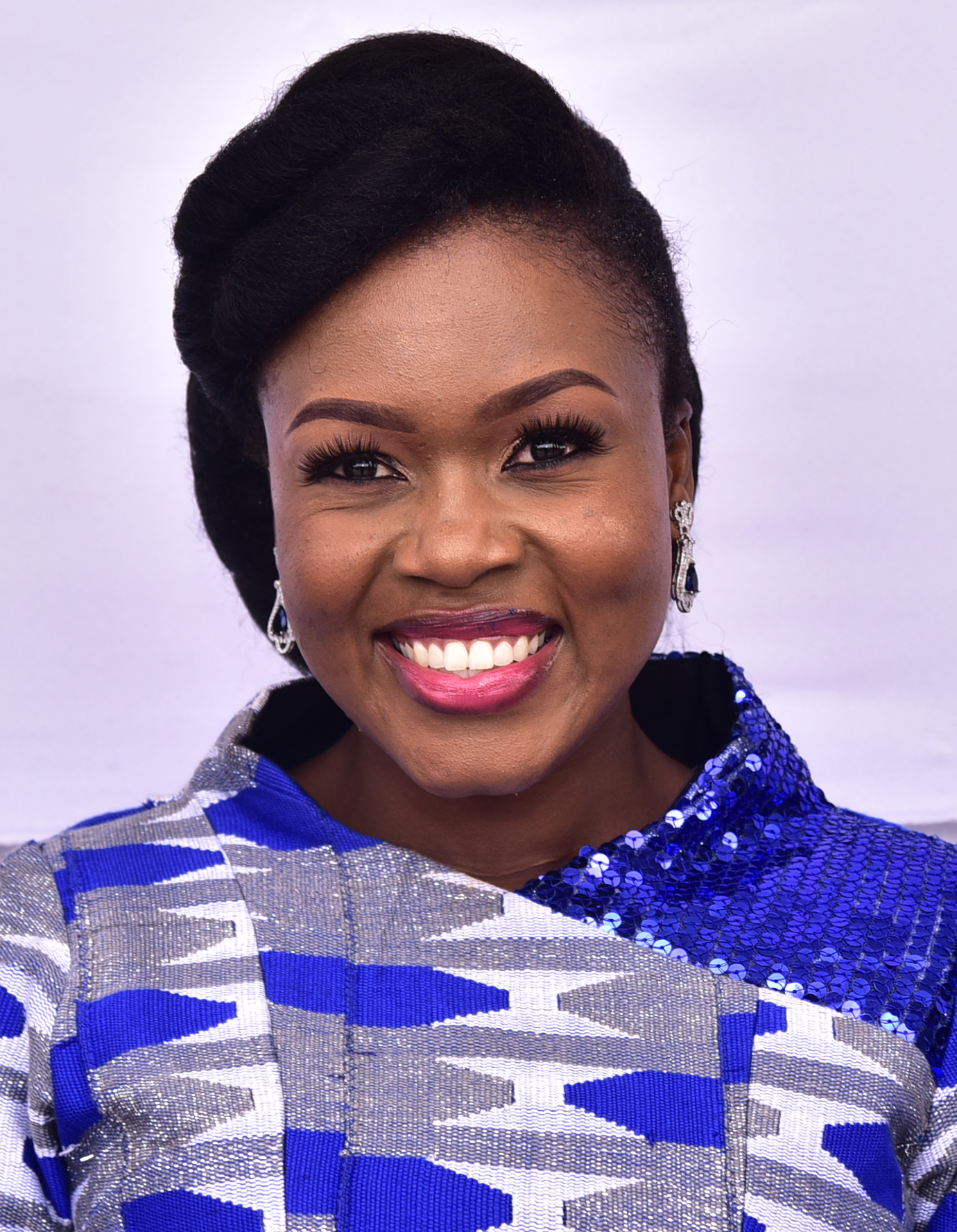

Member of Parliament
- Incumbent
- Assumed office 17 May 2021

Personal details
- Born: Anna Adeke; 27 November 1991 (age 34) Soroti District
- Party: Forum for Democratic Change
- Education: Makerere University (Bachelor of Laws) (Master of Laws) Law Development Centre (Diploma in Legal Practice)
- Occupation: Politician, lawyer

Anna Ebaju Adeke (born 27 November 1991) is a Ugandan lawyer and politician. Currently, she serves as a Member of Parliament representing Women in Soroti District in the 11th Parliament (2021–2026). She previously served as the parliamentary representative of the National Female Youth Constituency in the 10th parliament (2016–2021). She serves as the deputy president for the Forum for Democratic Change in the Eastern Region.

In the 12th parliament, she represents the people of the Soroti district as the woman member of parliament for the Soroti District.

In April 2026, Parliament confirmed her appointment as FDC Party Whip

== Early life and education ==
Adeke was born on 27 November, 1991. She attended Our Lady of Good Counsel Gayaza for her O' Level and later St Mary's SS Kitende for her A' Level. She has a Bachelor of Laws degree from Makerere University and a Postgraduate Diploma in Legal Practice from Law Development Center. On 17 May 2021, Adeke graduated with a Master of Laws degree from Makerere University; on the same day, she was sworn in as a member of Uganda's 11th Parliament (2021–2026).

== Career ==
From 2013 until 2014, Adeke served as the guild president of Makerere University. She ran and won under the opposition Forum for Democratic Change political party. Since 2015, when she completed her legal studies, she has been admitted to the Uganda Bar. She works as an advocate at M&K Advocates in Kampala.

In March 2016, Adeke was elected as the new National Female Youth Member of Parliament in national polls conducted in the Western Ugandan city of Hoima. In the national election, she ran as an independent. As an MP, she advocates for the separation of the Ministry of Gender, Labour, Youth, and Social Development to create an independent Youth Ministry. She also campaigns for increased funding for local, regional, and national youth councils. She was a member of the parliamentary committee on the National Economy in the 10th Parliament.

In 2019, Adeke was elected as chairperson of the Uganda Parliamentary Forum on Youth Affairs. She also served as the shadow minister for youth and children affairs, and a member of the Uganda Women's Parliamentary Association (UWOPA), in the 10th Parliament (2016 - 2021).

== Other activities ==
Adeke appeared in Vogue Italia in September 2017. In March 2017, The Ugandan Magazine listed her among the "10 Most Powerful Women In Ugandan Politics" in 2017.

She is a Roman Catholic.

She is passionate about gender and feminist issues, condemns sexual harassment, and urges women and the public to speak out against the evils of bullying sexual harassment and fight it. She also spoke out when a fellow parliamentarian tried to sexually harass her while on a foreign trip.

== See also ==
- Teso people
- living people
