= Proscovia Nalweyiso =

Ugandan female military general

Lieutenant General Proscovia Nalweyiso
- Born: June 1, 1954 (age 72); Rakai District, Uganda
- Citizenship: Uganda
- Occupation: Military Officer
- Years active: 1982 – present
- Known for: Military Matters
- Title: Adviser to the President of Uganda on military matters

Proscovia Nalweyiso is a senior Ugandan military officer in the Uganda People's Defence Forces (UPDF). At the rank of lieutenant general, she is the highest ranking female officer, in the Ugandan military.

== Background ==
She was born in June 1954, in Mpigi District, in a family with 20 children. In 1979, she began work as a schoolteacher and typist in her home area. During this period, she became an active member of the Ugandan Democratic Party.

Following the 1980 Ugandan national elections and the subsequent formation of the National Resistance Army (NRA), Nalweyiso joined the guerrillas in the bush in 1982.

== Military career ==
In 1983 a unit of female NRA fighters was formed and Nalweyiso was appointed as its commandant. The following year, the unit was relocated from Luweero District in Central Uganda, to Western Uganda.

In 1985, the unit Nalweyiso commanded, participated in the NRA forces that attacked Mbarara military barracks. Following that deployment, the NRA Women's Wing settled in Fort Portal, until the war ended in 1986.

In 1986, when the NRA captured power, Nalweyiso was given the rank of captain and appointed the commandant of the 800-member women's wing in the army, at that time. She steadily rose through the ranks and by 2000 was at the rank of lieutenant colonel.

For over a decade prior to her promotion to major general, she had worked at the Uganda State House as an aide and military adviser to the president of Uganda.

In February 2019, in a promotions exercise that involved over 2,000 men and women of the UPDF, she was promoted from the rank of major general to lieutenant general.

== Personal ==
In 1974, while still a civilian, Nalweyiso married an army officer. She later separated from her husband. She is the mother of four children.
