= Sandra Liu Huang =

Head of Education at Chan Zuckerberg Initiative

Sandra Liu Huang is a Taiwanese-American computer scientist. She leads the product team at the Chan Zuckerberg Initiative. Previously she was the director of product management at Quora, and an early and senior member of the product team at Facebook.

== Biography ==
Huang went to high school in Taiwan. She pursued her undergraduate education at Stanford University. After taking an introductory programming class, she was immediately drawn to computer science, and later became a teaching assistant for introductory computer science classes.

After graduating from Stanford, Huang took a job at Google as a product manager on the Adwords and AdSense projects. She then moved within Google to work on Google Checkout. After two years at Google, Huang joined Facebook as a product manager on the Instant Personalization program, a feature that allows outside websites to tailor their content to users who are also logged in to Facebook. At Facebook, she worked closely with Mark Zuckerberg (CEO) to create the company plan for 2011. After three years at Facebook, she joined Quora, a question-and-answer platform, as the company's first product manager. She worked on Quora's iPhone and Android mobile apps and other product updates, and later became Quora's director of product management.

In 2017, Huang left Quora to join the Chan Zuckerberg Initiative, a company founded by Priscilla Chan and Mark Zuckerberg with the goal to improve the state of health, education, scientific research, and energy.
