= Air Burundi =

Airline of Burundi (1971 to 2009)

| IATA | ICAO | Call sign |
|---|---|---|
| 8Y | PBU | AIR-BURUNDI |
- Founded: 1971
- Ceased operations: 2009
- Hubs: Bujumbura International Airport
- Fleet size: 1
- Destinations: 3 (all suspended)
- Headquarters: Bujumbura
- Key people: Emmanuel Habimana; Group Managing Director
- Website: www.burundiairlines.bi

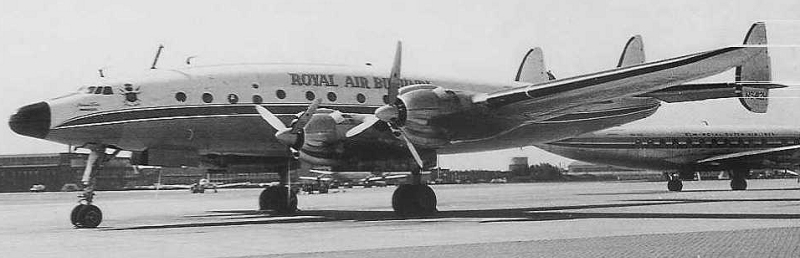
Royal Air Burundi Lockheed Connie

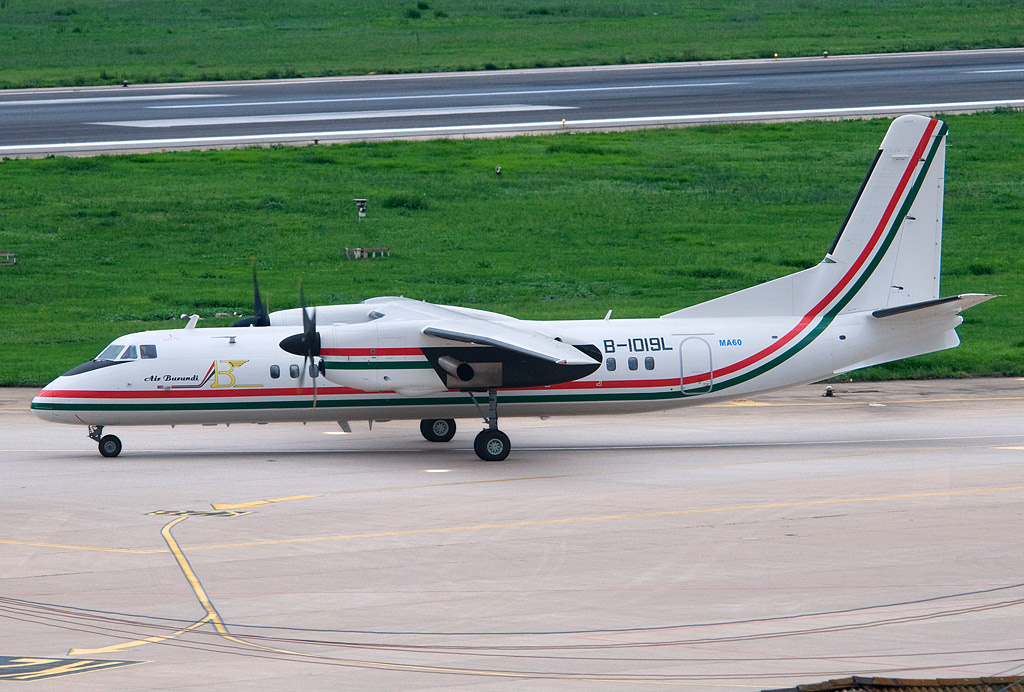
Air Burundi Xian MA-60

Air Burundi was the state-owned national airline of Burundi which operated from 1971 to 2009.

At its peak, the airline operated scheduled regional passenger services to Rwanda, Tanzania, and Uganda with its main base at Bujumbura International Airport, and headquarters in Bujumbura.

After many years of inactivity, the government started the process of reviving it. Its successor, Burundi Airlines, was formally established on 4 February 2021.

== History ==
=== Early history ===
The airline was established in April 1971 as the successor to Royal Air Burundi, and started operations in 1975. It was formed as Société de Transports Aériens du Burundi, and adopted the present name in June 1975. The airline began operations a fleet of two Douglas DC-3s followed by two De Havilland DHC-6 Twin Otter and a Sud Caravelle III in 1980. The 1996 Burundian Civil War put a lot of pressure on the airline, and transportation of all forms in the country was paralyzed. In 1999 the East African Community lifted sanctions on Burundi and the airline resumed operations from February 1, 1999.

=== Troubled operations ===
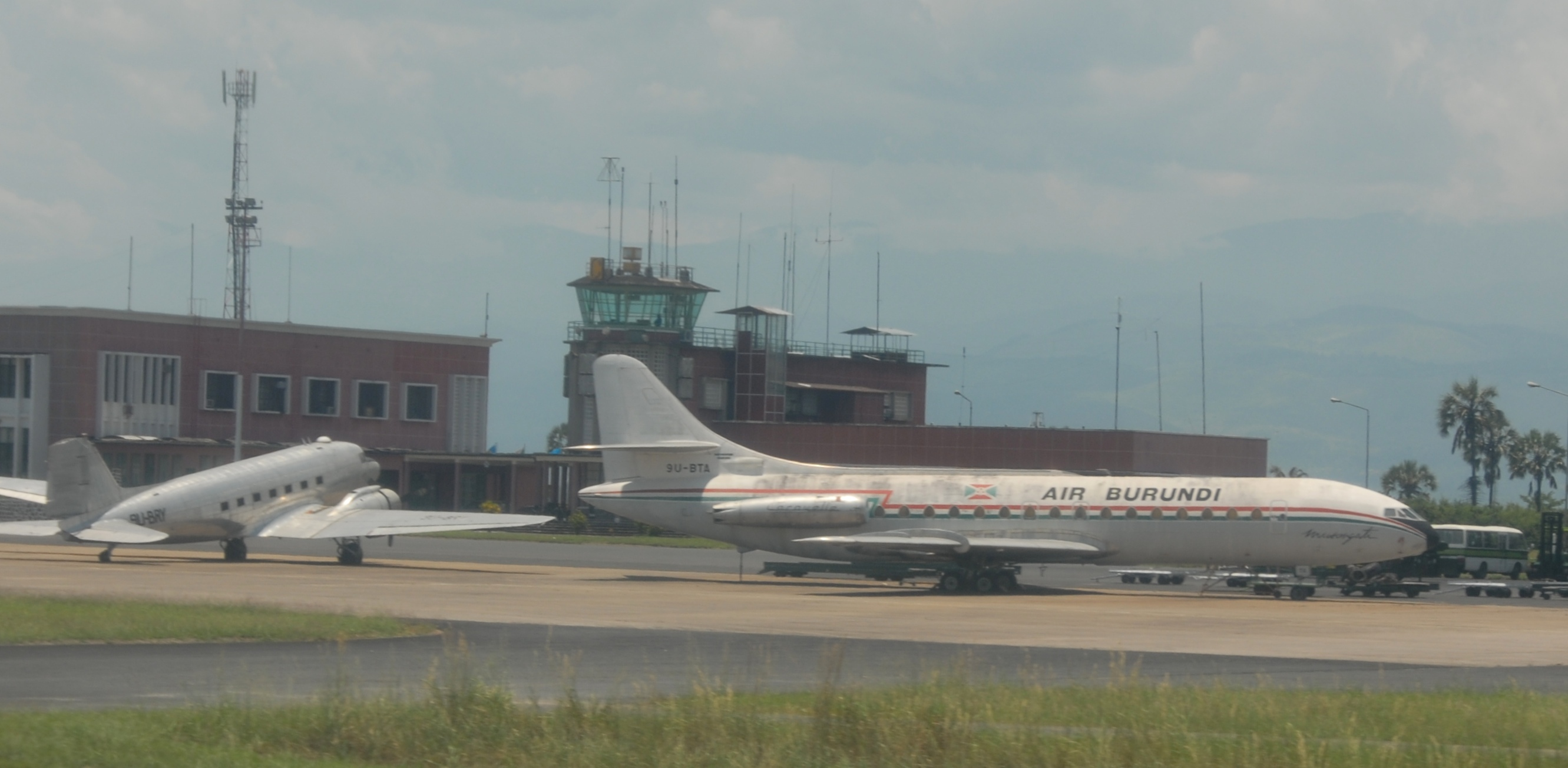
Air Burundi Sud SE-210 Caravelle III aircraft at Bujumbura International Airport in 2007

The airline continued to provide scheduled flights to nearby regional cities, however in spring of 2007, due to technical issues it temporarily suspended operations. In 2008, the airline was relaunched with a much smaller network, providing daily flights to Kigali and Entebbe.

In September 2009, an inability to secure adequate funding to overhaul its aircraft led to the airline's suspension of operations; the single aircraft in operation, a Beechcraft 1900, had reached the maximum flight hours before a major service was mandated. The aircraft was flown to South Africa to undergo regular maintenance operations, to cost at least $1m.

Press reports in September 2013 indicated that the airline will require $1.3 million to overhaul and return its Beechcraft 1900C into active service in support of the airline's sole functioning aircraft, an MA60. Despite the arrival of the MA60, operations have not resumed. For a second MA60, due as part of a "Buy one, get one free" deal with China, the contract regarding the purchase of the aircraft (recorded as having been a "donation" from China to Burundi) had yet to be finalised, with no delivery date agreed to date.

=== Revival ===
In August 2011, East African media reported that Air Burundi had started a process of restructuring. Six international companies had already been pre-selected, through competitive bidding, to propose a restructuring process. Plans were apparently under way to either lease or acquire new aircraft to facilitate the resumption of flight operations.

In January 2013 it was reported that the privatisation of Air Burundi had in part been delayed by the carrier's 90% shareholding in SOBUGEA (Société Burundaise de Gestion Aéroportuaire), the country's airport management company. Staff there argued that the Privatisation bill introduced by the government contained many irregularities, including reference to "Air-Burundi/Sobugea", a company that does not exist: "The first is a public company created in 1975, governed by Decree No. 100/160 of September 5, 1997, while the second was born in 1981 and governed by the laws of 12 March 2008." Although privatisation had been discussed a while ago, it was argued that the two companies should be taken separately: "Each has its heritage and its status. Contrary to what is stated in the explanatory memorandum, any reform concerning Air Burundi does not include SOBUGEA."

After years of discussion, Burundi Airlines was formally established on 4 February 2021 as the new flag carrier to replace Air Burundi.

== Corporate affairs ==
=== Ownership ===
Air Burundi, which had its head office in Bujumbura, was wholly owned by the government of Burundi.

Past suitors for Air Burundi were reported to have included the Aga Khan Fund for Economic Development (AKFED) (who in turn own the Celestair Group that includes Air Uganda, Air Mali and Air Burkina Faso) and various Chinese investors; no proposal bore fruit however, and the view was that any potential investors in a privatised Air Burundi would be "wary of the lack of a robust, clear legal framework that specifically defines the company's activities and roles."

=== Business trends ===
Financial and other business figures for Air Burundi were rarely published, even before operations were suspended; net profit figures have been reported as below:

| | 2006 | 2007 | 2008 | 2009 | 2010 | 2011 | 2012 | 2013 | 2014 | 2015 |
|---|---|---|---|---|---|---|---|---|---|---|
| Net profit (FBu m) | 291.1 | −11.7 | −346.5 | −253.2 | 71.9 | 318.4 | 164.5 | 465.1 | −162.7 | −83.9 |
| Notes/sources | | | | | | | | | | |

== Destinations ==
Until operations were suspended, Air Burundi operated scheduled international services to the following destinations:

| Hub |
| Future |
| Terminated/suspended |

| City | Country | IATA | ICAO | Airport | Refs |
|---|---|---|---|---|---|
| Bujumbura | Burundi | BJM | HBBA | Bujumbura International Airport | |
| Entebbe | Uganda | EBB | HUEN | Entebbe International Airport | |
| Kigali | Rwanda | KGL | HRYR | Kigali International Airport | |

== Fleet ==
=== Fleet at closure ===
The Air Burundi fleet consisted of the following aircraft (as of August 2019):

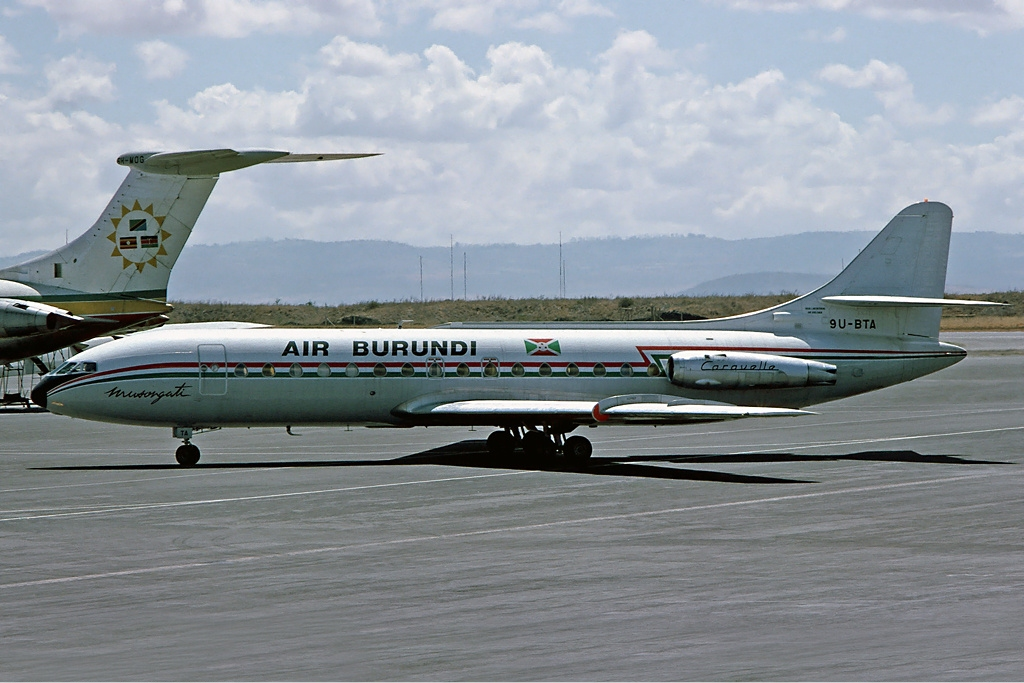
The Air Burundi Caravelle, pictured in 1976

Air Burundi fleet
| Aircraft | In service | Orders | Passengers | Notes |
|---|---|---|---|---|
| Xian MA60 | 1 | 1 | 52 | |
| Total | 1 | 1 | | |

=== Historical fleet ===
At August 2006, the airline also operated:

- 1 DHC-6 Twin Otter Series 300
- 1 Sud Aviation Caravelle

== See also ==
- Transport in Burundi
- List of companies of Burundi
- Economy of Burundi
