= List of Uganda Airlines destinations =

Uganda Airlines operates flights to the following destinations:

== List ==
Country	City	Airport	Notes	Refs
Burundi	Bujumbura	Bujumbura International Airport		
China	Guangzhou	Guangzhou Baiyun International Airport	Coming soon	
Democratic Republic of the Congo	Goma	Goma International Airport	Coming soon	
Democratic Republic of the Congo	Kinshasa	N'djili International Airport	Suspended	
Egypt	Cairo	Cairo International Airport	Coming soon	
India	Mumbai	Chhatrapati Shivaji Maharaj International Airport		
Ghana	Accra	Accra International Airport		
Kenya	Mombasa	Moi International Airport		
Kenya	Nairobi	Jomo Kenyatta International Airport		
Nigeria	Abuja	Nnamdi Azikiwe International Airport	Suspended	
Nigeria	Lagos	Murtala Muhammed International Airport		
Rwanda	Kigali	Kigali International Airport	Starting 18 November 2026	
Somalia	Mogadishu	Aden Adde International Airport		
South Africa	Cape Town	Cape Town International Airport	Coming soon	
South Africa	Johannesburg	O. R. Tambo International Airport		
Saudi Arabia	Jeddah	King Abdulaziz International Airport	Coming soon	
Saudi Arabia	Riyadh	King Khalid International Airport	Coming soon	
South Sudan	Juba	Juba International Airport		
Sudan	Khartoum	Khartoum International Airport	Coming soon	
Tanzania	Dar es Salaam	Julius Nyerere International Airport		
Tanzania	Kilimanjaro	Kilimanjaro International Airport		
Tanzania	Zanzibar	Zanzibar International Airport		
Thailand	Bangkok	Suvarnabhumi Airport	Coming soon	
Turkey	Istanbul	Istanbul Airport	Coming soon	
Uganda	Entebbe	Entebbe International Airport	Hub	
United Arab Emirates	Abu Dhabi	Zayed International Airport	Coming soon	
United Arab Emirates	Dubai	Dubai International Airport	Suspended	
United Kingdom	London	Gatwick Airport		
United States	Chicago	O'Hare International Airport	Coming soon	
United States	Miami	Miami International Airport	Coming soon	
United States	New York City	John F. Kennedy International Airport	Coming soon	
Zambia	Lusaka	Kenneth Kaunda International Airport		
Zimbabwe	Harare	Robert Gabriel Mugabe International Airport		

== See also ==
- Uganda Airlines (1976–2001)
- Air Uganda
