= Air Uganda =

National airline of Uganda (2007–2014)

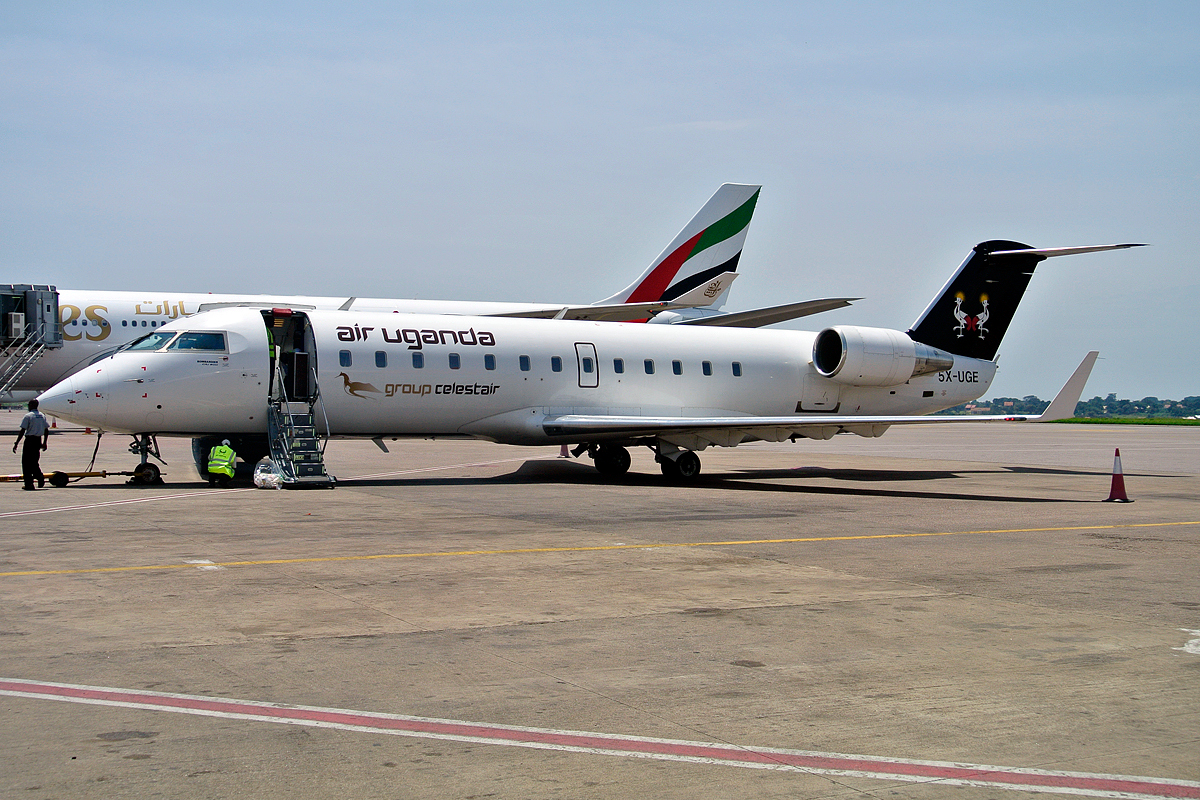
IATA	ICAO	Call sign
U7	UGA	UGANDA
- Commenced operations: 15 November 2007
- Ceased operations: 17 July 2014
- Operating bases: Entebbe International Airport
- Frequent-flyer program: Celestars
- Parent company: Celestair (Aga Khan Fund for Economic Development)
- Headquarters: 4 Wampewo Avenue; Kololo, Kampala, Uganda
- Key people: Cornwell Muleya (CEO)

Meridiana Africa Airlines (Uganda) Limited, trading as Air Uganda, was a privately owned airline in Uganda from 2007 to 2014. It suspended its operations when the Uganda Civil Aviation Authority (UCAA) revoked the airline's air operator's certificate.

Air Uganda had been widely recognized as the national carrier since the collapse of Uganda Airlines in May 2001.

Headquartered in Kampala, with its operations base at Entebbe International Airport, Air Uganda used three aircraft to operate scheduled flights between Entebbe and various destinations in eastern and central Africa.

== History ==
Air Uganda was formed in 2007 and began commercial flight operations on 15 November 2007. It transported over 70,000 passengers within its first twelve months, with an average load factor of 70 percent between Entebbe and Juba, South Sudan. The load factor between Entebbe and Nairobi averaged 60 percent during the first year of operation.

In the fourth quarter of 2011, Air Uganda announced plans to start domestic service during 2012. This required the airline to acquire appropriate aircraft to serve the domestic market.

In 2012, Air Uganda began self-handling at its hub at Entebbe International Airport and was authorised to handle any other airline that used its handling services. The move saved the airline at least US$700,000 annually.

In November 2013, the airline marked the sixth anniversary of its founding. At that time, it was the only Ugandan airline licensed by the UCAA to operate regularly scheduled flights to neighboring countries.

In May 2014, Air Uganda became a full member of the African Airlines Association, a trade organization of the industry on the continent. In the same month, the airline was admitted to the International Air Transport Association.

On 17 July 2014, Air Uganda suspended operations indefinitely after the issuer of its licence, the UCAA, ran into problems. The UCAA had failed a safety audit by the International Civil Aviation Organization in June 2014, resulting in the UCAA withdrawing licenses it had issued to air operators. At the time, Air Uganda said its potential re-certification was weeks away and that lessors had recalled their aircraft, opening a window for other carriers to grow passenger volumes in its area of operations.

== Corporate affairs ==
=== Ownership and associated companies ===
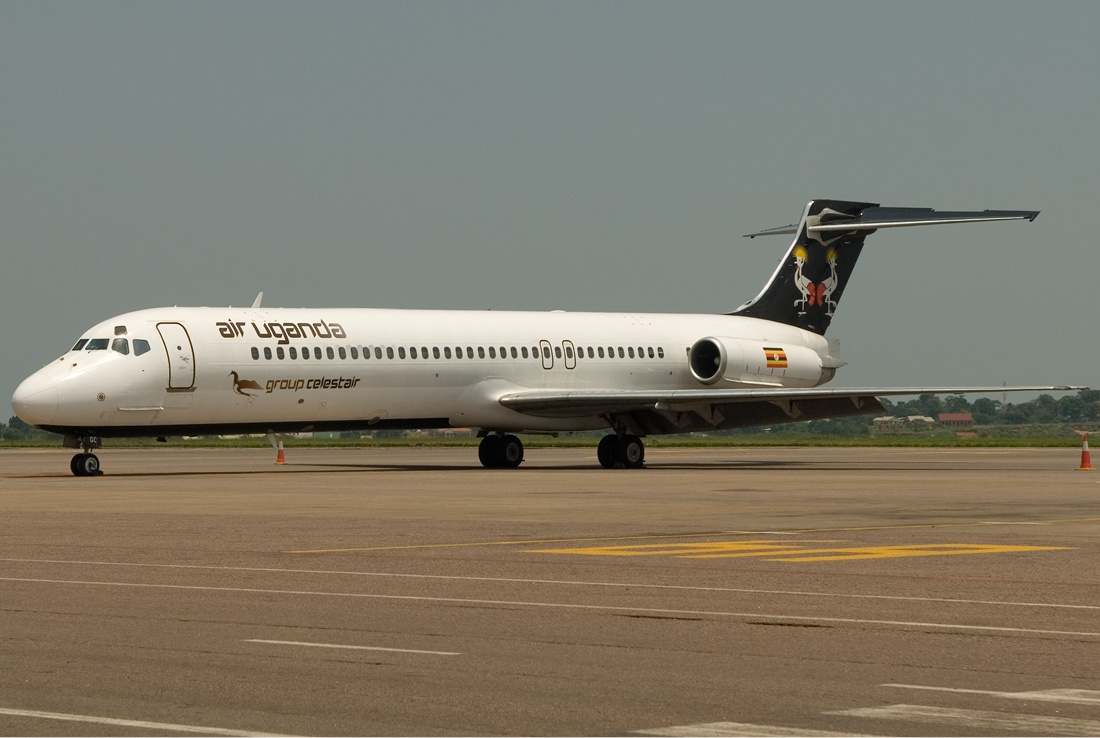
An Air Uganda McDonnell Douglas MD-87 at Entebbe International Airport, in August 2009

Meridiana Africa Airlines (Uganda) Limited was wholly owned by the Celestair Group, which in turn is owned by the Aga Khan Fund for Economic Development (AKFED). AKFED also controls Air Burkina and Air Mali, the national airlines of Burkina Faso and Mali, respectively, and has an interest in Europe in Meridiana.

=== Business trends ===
Because it was a private company, annual reports for Air Uganda were not published. In the absence of these, the little information that became available is shown below:

	2008	2009	2010	2011	2012	2013
Turnover						
Profits						
Number of employees					180	
Number of passengers (000s)	70				155	170
Passenger load factor (%)	65%					
Number of aircraft (at year-end)	3				4	3
Notes/sources						

== Destinations ==
=== Code share agreements and partnerships ===
During the second half of 2008, Air Uganda signed codeshare agreements with Air Tanzania on the Entebbe / Kilimanjaro International Airport, Entebbe / Dar es Salaam, and Entebbe / Zanzibar routes, which both airlines serviced. Code share agreements were also signed with Brussels Airlines on the Entebbe / Juba, South Sudan route serviced by Air Uganda and on the Entebbe / Brussels route serviced by Brussels Airlines. These arrangements were soon followed by similar agreements between Air Uganda and Qatar Airways.

In early 2009, Air Uganda made arrangements with Marsland Aviation for the latter to transport Air Uganda ticketed passengers between Juba and Khartoum and between Khartoum and Juba. Air Uganda traveled this route two days a week. Marsland Aviation carried Air Uganda passengers the remaining five days of the week when Air Uganda did not service the route.

In June 2010, Air Uganda signed a codeshare agreement with Rwandair on the Entebbe / Kigali route. Air Uganda served the route with a daily morning flight, while Rwandair provided a daily evening flight. Both airlines served the route with CRJ-200 aircraft. Those arrangements were halted by Air Uganda effective March 2012.

On 14 August 2013, a new codeshare agreement was entered between Air Uganda and Rwandair on the Entebbe / Kigali route. The agreement became effective immediately.

In January 2014, Air Uganda signed a codeshare agreement with Precision Air of Tanzania on the Entebbe / Dar es Salaam and the Entebbe / Kilimanjaro International Airport routes.

As of November 2013, Air Uganda maintained Interline partnerships with the following airlines: Brussels Airlines, Emirates, Kenya Airways, Qatar Airways, Gulf Air, Air Mali, Precision Air, Hahn Air, and RwandAir.

== Fleet ==
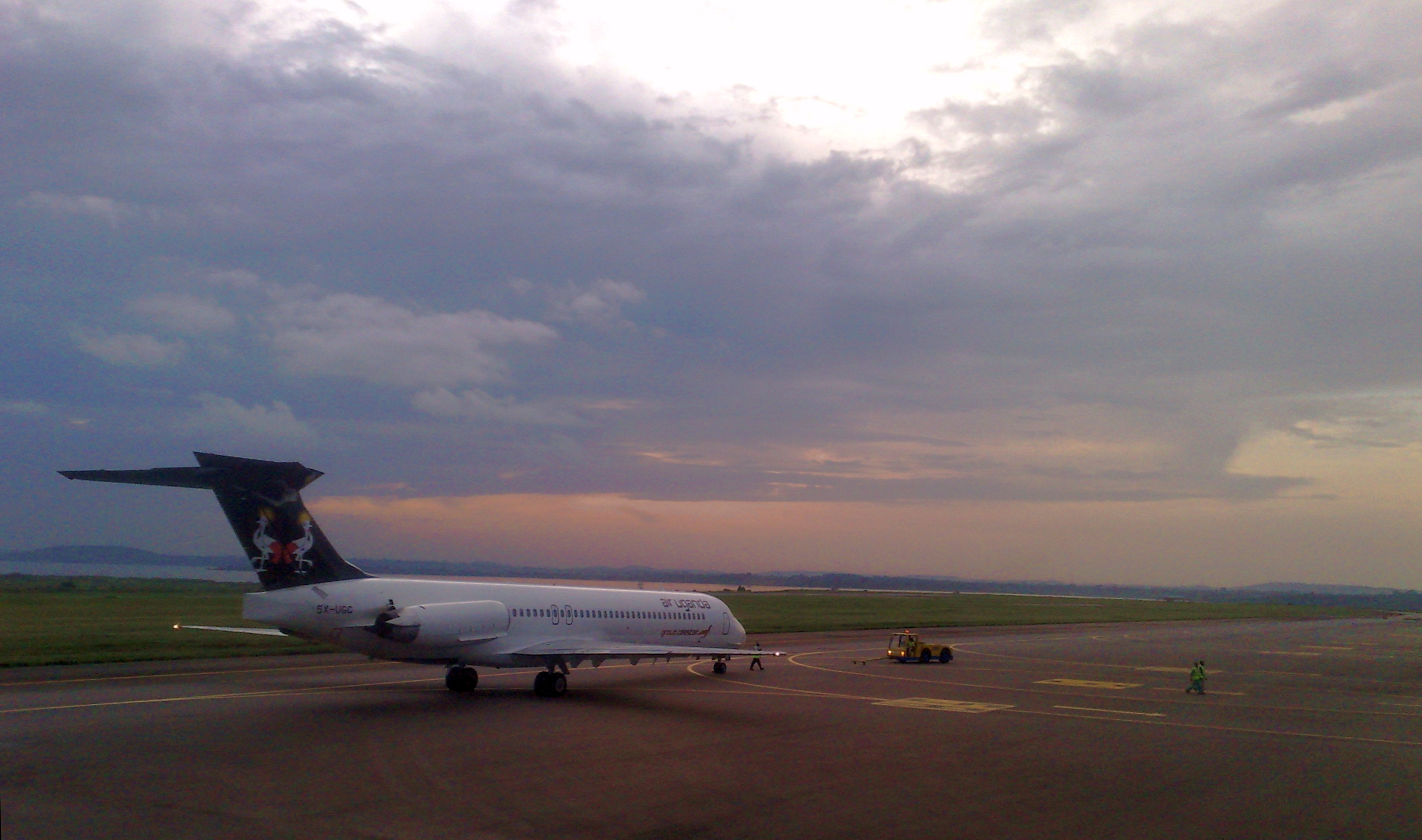
McDonnell Douglas MD-87 taxiing to runway 17 at Entebbe International Airport

The Air Uganda fleet consisted of the following aircraft as of April 2014, although in July 2014 they were reported as being returned to the European contractor from which they were leased:

Air Uganda fleet
Aircraft	In fleet	On order	Passengers	Notes
Bombardier CRJ200	3	0	50	
Total	3	0		

== Incidents and accidents ==
- On 9 January 2010, the United States Embassy in Khartoum, Sudan, warned of a possible terrorist threat on Air Uganda planes traveling between Juba, South Sudan, and Entebbe, Uganda. According to the embassy, it had received information that indicated "a desire by regional extremists to conduct a deadly attack on board Air Uganda aircraft." According to the Sudanese foreign ministry, however, the threat was not considered serious. The Uganda People's Defence Force said they had been aware of this information since early December 2009, although a Ugandan government spokesman said there was nothing to support such claims.

== See also ==
- Airlines of Africa
- List of airlines of Uganda
