= BJM (disambiguation) =

The Brian Jonestown Massacre is an American musical project and band led by Anton Newcombe.

BJM may also refer to:

- Being John Malkovich, a 1999 American black comedy-fantasy film
- "Big" John McCarthy
- Bujumbura International Airport (IATA code: BJM), an airport in Bujumbura (the former capital of Burundi)
