= Ouagadougou-Donsin Airport =

Airport in Donsin, Gounghin, Burkina Faso

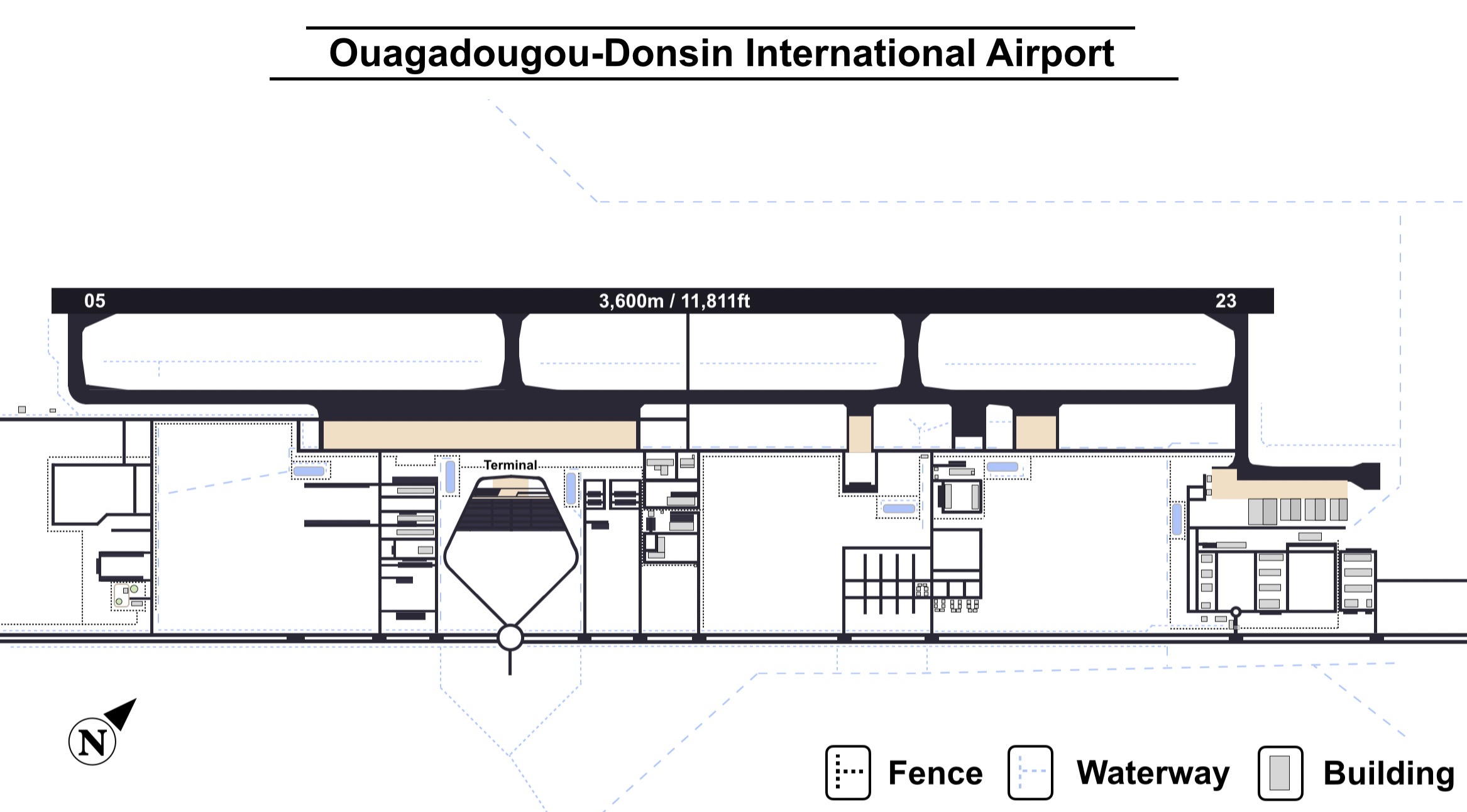
- IATA: none; ICAO: none

Summary
- Location: Donsin, Gounghin Department
- Opened: 2025 (delayed)
- Coordinates: 12°36′13″N 1°26′38″W

Map

Runways
Direction	Length		Surface
Direction	ft	m	Surface
05/23		3,500	Asphalt

Ouagadougou-Donsin International Airport is an airport under construction, located about 35 km north of Ouagadougou, Burkina Faso. It is planned to replace the existing Thomas Sankara International Airport.

== History ==
The existing airport Thomas Sankara International Airport Ouagadougou was constructed in the 1960s and is located in the urban built-up area of Ouagadougou creating pollution and hazards. In the mid-2010s a plan to construct a new airport to replace it. The site that was chosen is in the area of the village Donsin, around 35 kilometres (22 mi) north of Ouagadougou. The project management is handled by Maîtrise d’Ouvrage de l’Aéroport de Donsin (MOAD).

The first phase of construction of the new airport was planned for a five-year period beginning in 2013 and finishing in 2018. This phase was to focus on the construction of infrastructure that was required to move the operations from Ouagadougou to Donsin. The plans called for a single runway 3,500 m (11,500 ft) long, which was to be 500 m (1,600 ft) longer than the one at the current airport, with an option to extend to 4,000 m (13,000 ft). Generally 3,000 m (9,800 ft) is sufficient to land virtually any aircraft at sea level, but longer runways are helpful for heavily loaded cargo planes. Space for a second runway and its accompanying infrastructure had been reserved for when growth in air traffic warranted it.

Following delays, construction launched in September 2021. However, following the January 2022 and September 2022 coups d'état and the deaths of seven people when a building under construction at the new airport collapsed in December 2022, the new government under Ibrahim Traoré announced in January 2023 that the concession to build the airport, granted by his predecessor Roch Marc Christian Kaboré, had been cancelled. The contract for the continued construction of the airport was handed to Sogea-Satom, which began installing runways by early 2024. 2.2 million m^{3} of earthworks were exacavated, and 150,000 m^{3} of cement soil and 240,000 tonnes of bituminous concrete were laid. A 3,500 metre long and 75 metre wide runway was built, and taxiways and airport car parks were also built. Drainage measures included the installation of gutters, culverts, ditches, nozzles, and pollution control basins. The construction work was completed in spring of 2024.
