= Philanthrocapitalism =

Method of philanthropy that mirrors a for-profit business

Philanthrocapitalism or philanthropic capitalism is a way of doing philanthropy, which mirrors the way that business is done in the for-profit world. It may involve venture philanthropy that actively invests in social programs to pursue specific philanthropic goals that would yield return on investment over the long term, or in a more passive form whereby "social investors" benefit from investing in socially-responsible programs.

== History ==
The term appears as early as February 2006 in The Economist, and was popularized by Matthew Bishop and Michael Green in their 2008 book Philanthrocapitalism: How the Rich Can Save The World. The book was endorsed by Bill Clinton, who wrote in its foreword that this concept drives the Clinton Foundation. The shift in implementing business models in charity is not a new concept – John D. Rockefeller and Andrew Carnegie sought to apply their business strategies in their philanthropy in the 20th century. Since then, a significant increase in charity spending by other organizations such as the Bill & Melinda Gates Foundation and Chan Zuckerberg Initiative, both described as examples of philanthrocapitalism, has been noted.

In December 2015, Mark Zuckerberg and his spouse Priscilla Chan pledged to donate over the decades 99% of their Facebook shares, then valued at $45 billion, to the Chan Zuckerberg Initiative, a newly created LLC with a focus on health and education. These more modern organizations differ from other groups or organizations since their funds come more from the private capital of an individual rather than donors or profit from physical products. The integration of business models in charity foundations has focused on a symbiotic relationship between social responsibility and the local, national, and international markets. Philanthrocapitalism has been compared and contrasted with effective altruism due to the similar stated goals of the movements' advocates.

== Criticism ==
There are many criticisms of philanthrocapitalism, beginning with its limited transparency and accountability. There are also concerns that private philanthropy erodes support for governmental spending on public services. The main worry with this practice is that collectively, it can lead to tax revenue problems for the government. Donations are still going towards philanthropy, but some public services may not be able to utilize these funds because they may never receive them. Because of this, there is concern from John Cassidy that the wealth of a few may be able to determine what organizations receive the most funding.

Sociology professor Linsey McGoey has written that many current and past philanthropists amassed their fortunes through predatory business practices, thereby exacerbating the very social problems their philanthropy is intended to alleviate. Finally, there are concerns about the existence of ulterior motives. These ulterior motives can range from business owners avoiding capital-gains taxes by donating their company's excess stock instead of selling it, and estate taxes that would be assessed on their family, to collecting tax credits from the government.

== Limited liability companies ==
Some philanthropists have decided to forego the Foundation route in favor of utilizing a limited liability company (LLC) to pursue their philanthropic goals. This allows the organization to avoid three main restrictions on Foundations:

- Foundations must give away 5% of assets annually
- Foundations must disclose where the grants are going and generally can only give to 501(c)(3) registered charities
- Foundations must avoid funding or even advocating for a side in politics

The LLC structure allows the philanthropist to keep their initiatives private, although there is no requirement to do so. An LLC is allowed to support for-profit companies that it believes support its mission. And the LLC, therefore, is permitted to make and keep any profits made on such an investment. Lastly, an LLC can openly support politicians with whom it agrees and advocate for policy positions, even authoring such positions that elected officials may adopt. Lastly, the original donor, such as Zuckerberg, retains control over the shares donated. Had he donated shares to a Foundation, they would no longer be his to control.

A Partial List of Philanthropic LLCs:

- Chan Zuckerberg Initiative
- Arnold Ventures LLC
- Omidyar Network
- Emerson Collective

== See also ==
- Impact investing
- Microfinance
- Social entrepreneurship

== Sources ==
- The Economist, "The Birth of Philanthrocapitalism".
- Matthew Bishop and Michael Green, Philanthrocapitalism: How the Rich Can Save the World, http://www.philanthrocapitalism.net
- Edwards, Michael, 1957- (2008). Just another emperor?. Young Foundation (London, England). New York: Demos. ISBN 978-0-9816151-1-0. OCLC 236185548.
- A debate about philanthrocapitalism has run on Opendemocracy.net and another on the Global Philanthropy Forum at https://www.philanthropyforum.org/forum/Discussion_Forum1.asp
- Eikenberry, Angela M.; Mirabella, Roseanne Marie (January 2018). "Extreme Philanthropy: Philanthrocapitalism, Effective Altruism, and the Discourse of Neoliberalism". PS: Political Science & Politics. 51 (1): 43–47. doi:10.1017/S1049096517001378. ISSN 1049-0965. S2CID 158790996.
