= Air Mali =

Air Mali may refer to:

- Air Mali (1960–1989), the former national airline of Mali
- Air Mali (2005), a later Malian airline
