= Reach Every Reader =

Project to help children with reading difficulties

Reach Every Reader is a five-year initiative supported by a $30 million grant from Chan Zuckerberg Initiative co-founders Priscilla Chan and Facebook CEO Mark Zuckerberg. Reach Every Reader was launched by faculty at the Harvard Graduate School of Education and Massachusetts Institute of Technology's Integrated Learning Initiative, and involves collaborators at the Florida Center for Reading Research and Florida State University College of Communication and Information, and the Charlotte-Mecklenburg School District in North Carolina.

The collaboration consists of five projects:

- Diagnostic Screener
- Personalized Intervention
- PreK Home and Family Engagement
- Capacity Building for Educators and Families
- Integration and Building for the Future.

Reach Every Reader will develop a web-based screening tool for reading difficulties that diagnoses underlying causes. The diagnostic screening tool will identify kindergarteners who are at high risk for reading difficulty. The goal is to make this type of screening available to all children.

The collaboration will also examine which interventions work for which students in order to work toward the development of personalized interventions.

Researchers will work with schools to deliver their interventions to kindergarten students in summer programs and eventually implement them in the school curriculum.

Concern has been expressed that the project involves "crisis talk" that creates pressure for children, and that parents may be concerned about the tracking of their children's personal information.
