= Cornwell Muleya =

Zambian aviation consultant

- Born: Zambia
- Citizenship: Zambia
- Education: University of Bath (Bachelor of Science in Chemical Engineering); Association of Chartered Certified Accountants (Fellow of the Association of Chartered Certified Accountants)
- Occupation: Aviation Consultant
- Known for: Professional competence
- Title: Acting chief executive officer, Industrial Development Corporation Zambia

Cornwell Muleya is a Zambian chemical engineer, accountant and aviation consultant, who served as the Acting Chief Executive Officer at Uganda National Airlines Company the revived national airline of Uganda, effective October 2019. He was relieved of this position by an "interim" board of directors of the airline in February 2022. Before that, from March 2019, until October 2019, he served as the Technical Director at the same company. He is now the acting chief executive officer at Industrial Development Corporation Zambia.

== Background and education ==
Muleya was born in Zambia, circa 1960s. He studied at the University of Bath, in Bath, Somerset, United Kingdom, from 1983 until 1986, graduating with a Bachelor of Science degree in chemical engineering. He then went on to obtain qualifications in accounting and auditing.

== Career ==
He started out as an audit manager at PriceWaterhouseCoopers, working out of their Lusaka office between 1989 and 1995. He then transferred to Air Botswana Corporation, working there for seven years, rising to the position of chief executive officer, in the process. At that time, he was based in Gaborone, Botswana's capital city.

Muleya has also previously worked with Air Mauritius Limited as the Chief Finance Officer, based in Port Louis and at Zambezi Airlines Limited, as the chief executive officer, based in Lusaka. He has also worked as the CEO at ALS – Aircraft Leasing Services, based at Nairobi, and at Air Uganda as the CEO, from 2013 until 2014. Immediately prior to this new assignment, and concurrent with his new role, Muleya is the Founder & Director of Cornwell Aviation Consultants Limited, an aviation consultancy based in Lusaka Zambia.

In October 2019, Muleya was appointed Acting CEO at Uganda Airlines, while the company searched for a substantive CEO. He replaced Ephraim Bagenda, who was named director of engineering and maintenance at the national airline. As of July 2020, the search for a substantive CEO at Uganda Airlines was ongoing. Meantime, Muleya's contract as acting CEO was extended to February 2021. In April 2021, the Daily Monitor newspaper reported that his short-term contract had been extended until September 2022, while the search for a substantive CEO continues.

In April 2021, General Katumba Wamala, the Cabinet Minister of Works and Transport, suspended (with full pay), Muleya the CEO together with 12 other senior management officials at Uganda Airlines. This was on directives from the president of Uganda, Yoweri Museveni, who ordered investigations into, corruption, mismanagement and other infractions at the airline.

After nine months of suspension, an interim board of directors terminated Muleya's contract, together with the contracts of the other 12 senior airline managers who worked under his supervision. The board was "interim", because the original board was also terminated and dissolved at the same time.

== See also ==
- Michael Etyang
- Gad Gasatura
