= Burundi Airlines =

Flag carrier of Burundi

IATA	ICAO	Call sign
n/a	n/a	n/a
- Founded: 4 February 2021
- Hubs: Melchior Ndadaye International Airport
- Headquarters: 13 Avenue du commerce Bujumbura
- Website: www.burundiairlines.bi

Burundi Airlines (IATA: n/a, ICAO: n/a) is a state-owned national airline of Burundi, to function as the national carrier of the East African country and successor to the defunct Air Burundi. The government of Burundi owns 92 percent of the new airline's stock. Burundi Airlines was formally established on 4 February 2021.

== Overview ==
The new airline is a merger of the defunct Air Burundi, which ceased operations in 2009, and SOBUGEA, a Burundian government-owned company responsible for ground handling and airport maintenance. The new combined entity owns 92 percent of Burundi Airlines stock. The remaining 8 percent shareholding is split between a Belgian company and the state-owned insurance company Societe d'Assurances du Burundi (Socabu).

== Ownership ==
The table below illustrates the shareholding in the stock of Burundi Airlines, as of February 2021.

Burundi Airlines stock ownership
Rank	Name of owner	Domicile	Percentage ownership
1	Government of Burundi	Burundi	92.0
2	Company Affiliated With SABENA	Belgium	4.0
3	Société d’Assurances du Burundi (Socabu)	Burundi	4.0
	Total		100.0

== History ==
The former national carrier, Air Burundi was established in 1971, began operations in 1975 and ceased operations in 2009. As part of previous attempts at revival of Air Burundi, the matter came up for discussion during a Cabinet of Burundi meeting on 26 May 2020.

When the matter came up again in a cabinet meeting on 28 December 2020, the decision was made to merge Air Burundi assets with those of SOBUGEA to constitute the government's 92 percent contribution to the new Burundi Airlines. Other shareholders include the state-owned insurer, Société d’Assurances du Burundi (SOCABU) and the estate of the defunct Belgian airline, SABENA.

== Fleet ==
In 2012 the defunct Air Burundi took delivery of a Xian MA60, 52-seater, two-engine turboprop aircraft. Under arrangement with the manufacturers, another similar aircraft was due to be delivered later. The new Burundi Airlines is expected to begin service with those two airplanes. More aircraft will be acquired as need arises. The government is also currently looking for companies from which to lease airplanes before the acquisition of its own airplanes.

Burundi Airlines fleet
Aircraft	In service	Orders	Passengers	Notes
Xian MA60	1	1	52	
Total	1	1		

== See also ==
- Transport in Burundi
- List of companies of Burundi
- Economy of Burundi
