= Celestair =

African airline alliance

IATA	ICAO	Call sign
—	—	-
- Hubs: Ouagadougou Airport, Bamako Airport, Entebbe Airport
- Alliance: Celestair Group

Celestair is an alliance of Air Burkina, Air Mali, and Air Uganda.

== Fleet ==
Celestair Group represents an alliance of three airlines under the Aga Khan Fund for Economic Development, AKFED, and benefits from technical and operative support from other airlines owned by the Aga Khan, such as Meridiana and Eurofly of Italy. The Celestair fleet consists of the following aircraft (as of March 2009 ):

- 8 McDonnell Douglas MD-87 (three aircraft are operated for Air Uganda, two aircraft are operated for Air Burkina, and two aircraft are operated for Air Mali).

At least 1 Bombardier CRJ (seen July 2014)

=== Members ===
Member airline	Country	Joined
Air Burkina	Burkina Faso	2007
Air Mali	Mali	2009
Air Uganda	Uganda	2007
