= Bobo Dioulasso Airport =

Airport in Burkina Faso

Bobo Dioulasso Airport Aéroport de Bobo-Dioulasso
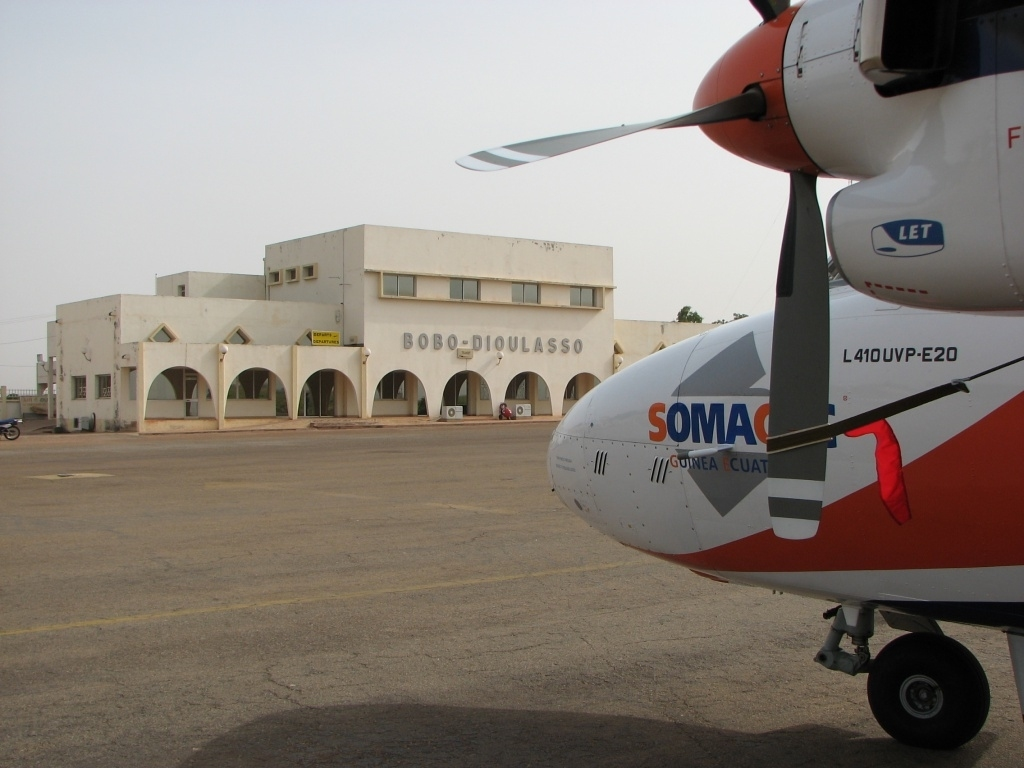
- IATA: BOY; ICAO: DFOO

Summary
- Airport type: Public
- Operator: Government
- Serves: Bobo Dioulasso, Burkina Faso
- Elevation AMSL: 1,511 ft / 461 m
- Coordinates: 11°09′36.479″N 004°19′51.121″W

Map
- Location within Burkina Faso

Runways
Direction	Length		Surface
Direction	m	ft	Surface
06/24	3,300	10,826	Asphalt

Statistics (2020)
- Passengers: 18,220
- Source: Burkina Faso AIP DAFIF Source Statistic.

Bobo Dioulasso Airport (IATA: BOY, ICAO: DFOO) is an international airport in Bobo Dioulasso, Burkina Faso.

The airport has commercial flights to Ouagadougou and to the Ivory Coast.

DFOO is served by a VOR/DME and NDBs and Runway 06 has a Category I ILS. There are also GNSS, VOR and ADF approaches to each runway.

== Airlines and destinations ==
Airlines	Destinations
Air Burkina	Abidjan, Ouagadougou
