= Air Burkina =

State-owned flag carrier of Burkina Faso

IATA	ICAO	Call sign
2J	VBW	BURKINA
- Founded: 17 March 1967; 59 years ago (as Air Volta)
- Hubs: Thomas Sankara International Airport Ouagadougou
- Alliance: Celestair
- Fleet size: 2
- Destinations: 9
- Parent company: Government of Burkina Faso
- Headquarters: Ouagadougou, Burkina Faso
- Website: www.air-burkina.com

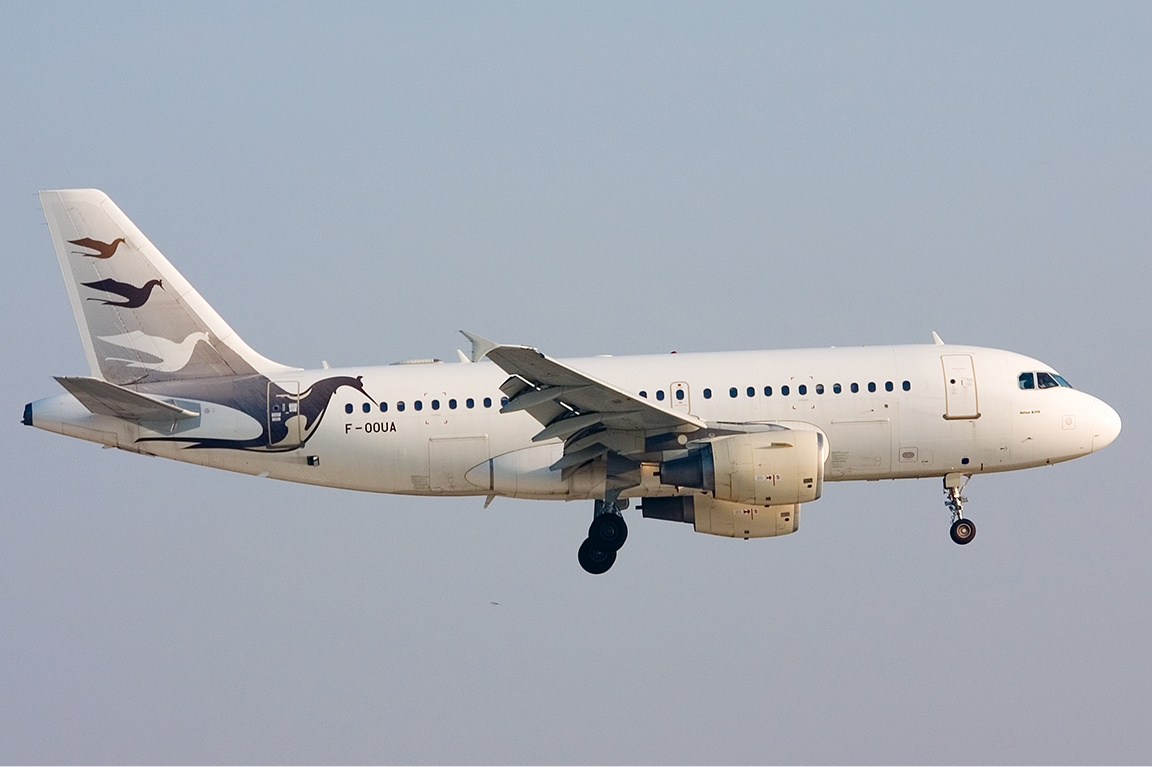
Air Burkina Airbus A319

Air Burkina SA is the national airline of Burkina Faso, operating scheduled services from its main base at Ouagadougou Airport to one domestic destination, Bobo-Dioulasso, as well as regional international services to Togo, Benin, Mali, Niger, Côte d'Ivoire, Senegal and Ghana. From 2001 to 2017, the airline was majority owned by an AKFED/IPS consortium, but is now back in government ownership, with reports that a new investor is being sought.

== History ==
The airline was established on 17 March 1967 under the name Air Volta, while the country was called the Republic of Upper Volta. The airline was renamed Air Burkina in 1984, following the country's name change to Burkina Faso. It was originally part owned by the Burkinabé government, part by Air France and part privately held. It purchased its first aircraft, an Embraer EMB-110 Bandeirante, in 1978, and added a second, a Fokker F28, in 1983.

Over the years, the airline has had serious debt problems, reaching a deficit of one billion CFA francs in 1992 (approx. €1,500,000). In part to address its debt problem, the Burkina Faso government privatised Air Burkina on 21 February 2001, transferring 56% of the shares to the AKFED/IPS consortium, part of the Aga Khan Development Network. At that time, the government retained 14% of shares. In 2001, following Air Burkina's privatisation and the liquidation of Air Afrique, the airline's debt had largely been alleviated and it was predicting an annual revenue of around 3.5 billion CFA francs (more than €5 million).

The company saw a general strike in 2002, when workers demanded a 25% wage increase. In the resulting conflict, the director-general of Air Burkina was forced to resign.

In August 2013, press reports said that the majority shareholder, AKFED & IPS, will be called in for talks by the government after its most recent Council of Ministers meeting resolved to discuss the airline's financial state. According to the Burkinabé Ministry of Infrastructure & Transport, a report presented to the government claimed the Burkinabé national carrier "faces a difficult financial and economic situation." In May 2017, it was announced that the government had taken over the management of Air Burkina, following the signing of a contract of management cessation with AKFED, with the sale of shares to be made at a symbolic franc. There were also reports that a new investor was being sought.

In October 2020, a transfer agreement was signed between the State of Burkina Faso and the American company African Global Development (AGD) as part of a new privatization effort for Air Burkina, however, in 2026, Air Burkina was fully nationalized by the Ibrahim Traoré administration, reverting the privatization effort.

== Corporate affairs ==
=== Shareholders ===
The airline is currently (May 2017) owned by the Government of Burkina Faso.

From 2001 to 2017, the company has been majority owned by an AKFED/IPS consortium, and was therefore a member of the Celestair alliance of African airlines.

=== Business trends ===
Financial and other business figures for Air Burkina are not fully available, as the company was privately owned until 2017. In the absence of the accounts, some information has been made available, usually in the press, as shown below:

	2009	2010	2011	2012	2013	2014	2015	2016
Turnover (CFA bn)		25						
Profits (CFA m)								
Number of employees				262	254			230
Number of passengers (000s)		160	17		129	107.6		
Passenger load factor (%)								
Number of aircraft (at year end)			5	3	3	2		2
Notes/sources								

=== Head office ===
Air Burkina is headquartered in the Air Burkina Building (French: Immeuble Air Burkina) in Avenue de la Nation, Ouagadougou.

== Destinations ==
Air Burkina serves the following destinations (as of May 2017):

Hub
Future
Terminated route

City	Country	IATA	ICAO	Airport	Refs
Abidjan	Ivory Coast	ABJ	DIAP	Port Bouet Airport	
Accra	Ghana	ACC	DGAA	Accra International Airport	
Bamako	Mali	BKO	GABS	Modibo Keita International Airport	
Bobo-Dioulasso	Burkina Faso	BOY	DFOO	Bobo Dioulasso Airport	
Cotonou	Benin	COO	DBBB	Cadjehoun Airport	
Dakar	Senegal	DSS	GOOY	Blaise Diagne International Airport	
Lomé	Togo	LFW	DXXX	Lomé-Tokoin International Airport	
Niamey	Niger	NIM	DRRN	Diori Hamani International Airport	
Ouagadougou	Burkina Faso	OUA	DFFD	Thomas Sankara International Airport	

=== Codeshare and Interline agreements ===
Air Burkina has Codeshare and Interline agreements with the following airlines:

=== Codeshare agreements ===
- Air France
- ASKY Airlines
- Kenya Airways

=== Interline agreements ===
- Air Algérie
- Air Côte d'Ivoire
- Air France
- ASKY Airlines
- Emirates
- Ethiopian Airlines
- Hahn Air
- Heli Air Monaco
- Kenya Airways
- Royal Air Maroc
- South African Airways
- Tunisair

== Fleet ==
=== Current fleet ===
As of October 2025, Air Burkina operates an all-Embraer E-Jet fleet composed of the following aircraft:

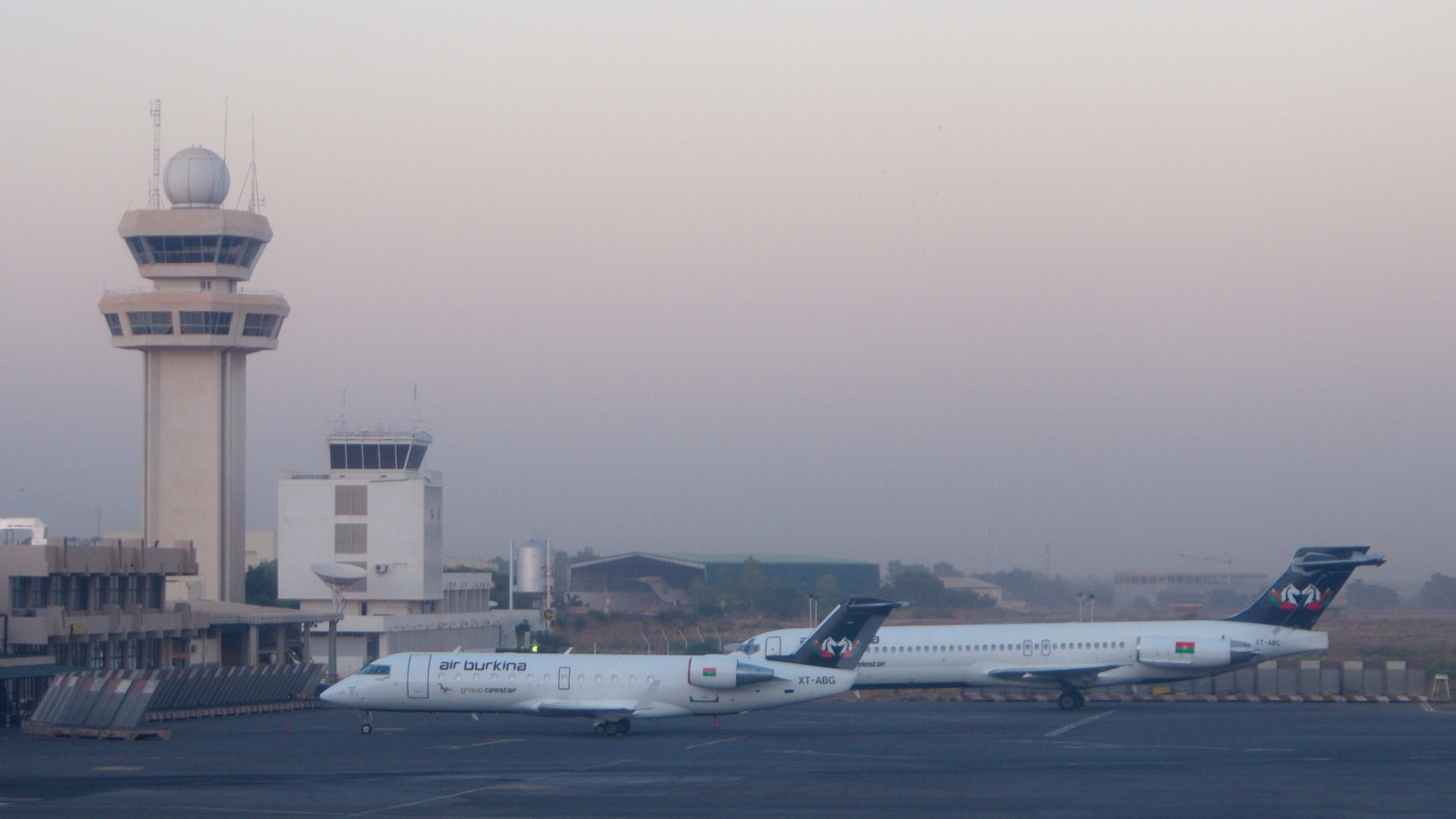
A Bombardier CRJ200 (foreground) and an MD-87 of Air Burkina, seen at Ouagadougou Airport in December 2012

Air Burkina fleet
Aircraft	In Service	Passengers			Notes
Aircraft	In Service	J	Y	Total	Notes
Embraer 190	2	12	92	104	
Total	2				

=== Historical fleet ===
The airline has operated various aircraft in the past, including 1 Boeing 737-500, 2 Bombardier CRJ200s, 2 McDonnell Douglas MD-87s, 3 Fokker F28s and 2 Embraer 170s.

=== Notable pilots ===
- Zenab Issa Oki Soumaïne was Chad's first female pilot and flew for Air Burkina.
