= Chan Zuckerberg Initiative =

American philanthropic organization

Chan Zuckerberg Initiative LLC
- Type: Private
- Industry: Biotechnology; Education; Healthcare; Pharmaceuticals; Philanthropy
- Founded: 1 December 2015; 10 years ago
- Founders: Mark Zuckerberg; Priscilla Chan
- Headquarters: Redwood City, California, United States
- Key people: Mark Zuckerberg (Founder & Co-CEO); Priscilla Chan (Founder & Co-CEO); Lori Goler (President)
- Brands: Render; Along
- Divisions: CZ Biohub Network; CZ Imaging Institute
- Website: chanzuckerberg.com

The Chan Zuckerberg Initiative (CZI) is an organization established and owned by Facebook founder Mark Zuckerberg and his wife Priscilla Chan with an investment of 99 percent of the couple's wealth from their Facebook shares over their lifetime.

The CZI is legally set up as a limited liability company (LLC) that can be seen as a for-profit charity and is an example of philanthrocapitalism. CZI has been deemed likely to be "one of the most well-funded philanthropies in human history". Chan and Zuckerberg announced its creation on 1 December 2015, coinciding with the birth of their first child.

The Chan Zuckerberg Initiative's main areas of work include science, education, and justice and opportunity, which focuses on promoting housing affordability, criminal justice reform, and immigration reform.

== Activities ==
=== Education ===
The Chan Zuckerberg Initiative invested $24 million in Andela, a startup focused on training software developers in Africa through a boot camp and four-year fellowship program that pairs their trainees with U.S. companies needing development help. The Chan Zuckerberg Initiative led the company's Series B funding.

In 2016, Chan and CZI co-founded The Primary School, a non-profit organization that promised to provide K–12 education, prenatal care, early childhood education, primary health care, and other programs and services for free to residents in East Palo Alto, California and the surrounding areas. She served as the emeritus board chair of the school. In 2022, The Primary School received approximately $8 million in donations, and in 2023, the school recorded nearly $4 million in contributions. In April 2025, CZI announced that the school would close at the end of the 2025-2026 school year. "due to a lack of funding". CZI pledged $50 million over five years to "parent engagement programs, early childhood education and health care services" in "the East Palo Alto, Belle Haven, and East Bay communities". As of April 2026, when a notice of staff layoffs was submitted to the state department of employment, the school had approximately 550 students on two campuses, in East Palo Alto and San Leandro.

In September 2016, Indian education startup Byju's announced raising $50 million in a round co-led by The Chan Zuckerberg Initiative and Sequoia Capital, along with investors Sofina, Lightspeed Venture Partners, and Times Internet. The funding has been raised to fuel their international expansion.

On 6 March 2018, the Harvard Gazette published that the Chan Zuckerberg Initiative would pledge $30 million to the Reach Every Reader project. Both Harvard's President Drew Faust and MIT's President L. Rafael Reif were quoted in the article, as were Priscilla Chan, HGSE Dean James E. Ryan, and MIT's Sanjay Sarma, VP for Open Learning at MIT, and others. The article states: "To make significant progress in early literacy at scale, the team will engage in a rigorous, scientific approach to personalized diagnosis and intervention. They will develop and test a scalable, web-based screening tool for reading difficulties that diagnoses the underlying causes, and a set of targeted home/school interventions that change the way we approach intervention for young children with reading difficulties."

In 2018, CZI announced it was supporting the development of a civic tech talent pipeline by funding Coding it Forward. No discrete information was provided about the quality or quantity of funding.

The Initiative has funded a free online learning platform, Summit Learning, that is based on a personalized learning philosophy. The use of the platform in some schools has led to concerns about efficacy and student privacy.

The Chan Zuckerberg Initiative has funded a number of small-scale, grassroots initiatives to better understand the "physical, mental, social and emotional health and development of students as a way to improve academic success," as well as new efforts to make Native American or Black culture more embedded in students' curriculums. Chan said, "We have to be really thoughtful about how we can be helpful and build a collective community alongside others and behind practitioners and school leaders," and that educational initiatives must be responsive to local needs because "there is not one thing that's going to solve everything."

In May 2022, the Chan Zuckerberg initiative announced grants totaling more than $4 million in support of education communities. The grants will support a range of professional learning, mentoring, and wellness practices to support teacher retention. The grants include $1 million donations to FuelED, The Teacher Well, Profound Gentlemen, and $500,000 to Profound Ladies and Black Male Educators Alliance of Michigan.

=== Housing and economic opportunity ===
The Chan Zuckerberg Initiative, in partnership with The San Francisco Foundation and other philanthropic, business, and health organizations, created the Partnership for the Bay's Future in 2019 to "preserve, produce, and protect affordable housing". The partnership includes a $500+ million fund for subsidized affordable housing units in the Bay Area, as well as grants for local governments and community organizations to work together to pass local housing legislation that protects tenants and promotes affordability.

On 1 October 2018, The Chan Zuckerberg Initiative announced it was helping to launch Opportunity Insights, a new non-partisan, not-for-profit research and policy institute focused on improving economic opportunity led by Raj Chetty, John Friedman, and Nathaniel Hendren. The research aims to "better understand the drivers of poverty as well as solutions that can foster greater economic mobility and security for more families".

=== Politics ===
The Chan Zuckerberg Initiative supported the failed campaign for the 2020 California Proposition 15, which would have adjusted the original 1978 California Proposition 13 by raising large commercial property taxes.

In addition, the Chan Zuckerberg Initiative opposed the failed 2020 California Proposition 20, a measure which would have led to stricter sentencing and parole laws.

Following electoral defeats of CZI-backed initiatives in 2020, the CZI announced a restructuring that would no longer fund political campaigns directly.

=== Scientific research ===
In September 2016, CZI announced its new science program, Chan Zuckerberg Science, with $3 billion in investment over the next decade, with Cornelia Bargmann of Rockefeller University announced as the first president of science, to begin 1 October 2016. The goal of the program is to help cure, manage, or prevent all disease by the year 2100. $600 million of the $3 billion would be spent on Biohub, a location in San Francisco's Mission Bay District near the University of California, San Francisco, to allow for easy interaction and collaboration between scientists at University of California, San Francisco; University of California, Berkeley; Stanford University; and other universities in the area, as well as engineers and others. Commentators saw the move as an audacious but worthwhile goal, while noting that the amount of funding is small relative to overall money spent on biomedical research. This funding is equal to roughly 2% of the NIH budget earmarked for basic research over the same time frame. Any patents generated at Biohub would be jointly owned by Biohub and the discoverer's home institution.

The Chan Zuckerberg Initiative's first acquisition took place in January 2017 with the acquisition of Meta, a Toronto-based artificial intelligence scientific literature search engine that helps scientists collaborate on solutions and accelerates the dissemination of new scientific research. On 28 October 2021, CZI announced the sunset of Meta, with a proposed shutdown date of 31 March 2022.

The Chan Zuckerberg Initiative was a founding sponsor of the Vector Institute for Artificial Intelligence at Toronto's MaRS Discovery District in March 2017.

=== COVID-19 response ===
The Chan Zuckerberg Initiative invested heavily in coronavirus research and response following the COVID-19 outbreak in 2020. The organization has contributed multiple grants to various universities and partnerships studying how the coronavirus spreads and possible treatments or vaccines. The Chan Zuckerberg Biohub partnered with Stanford and UCSF to help to significantly increase free testing in the Bay Area starting in March 2020. In April 2020, CZI joined the Government of the United Kingdom and Madonna in pledging funding for the COVID-19 Therapeutics Accelerator, a public-private partnership led by the Bill & Melinda Gates Foundation, Wellcome Trust and Mastercard.

The Chan Zuckerberg Biohub announced in July 2020 that it would partner with all 58 California county departments of public health to provide free genomic sequencing of positive coronavirus samples to better understand how the virus is spreading and inform policy decisions.

=== Open software and open science ===
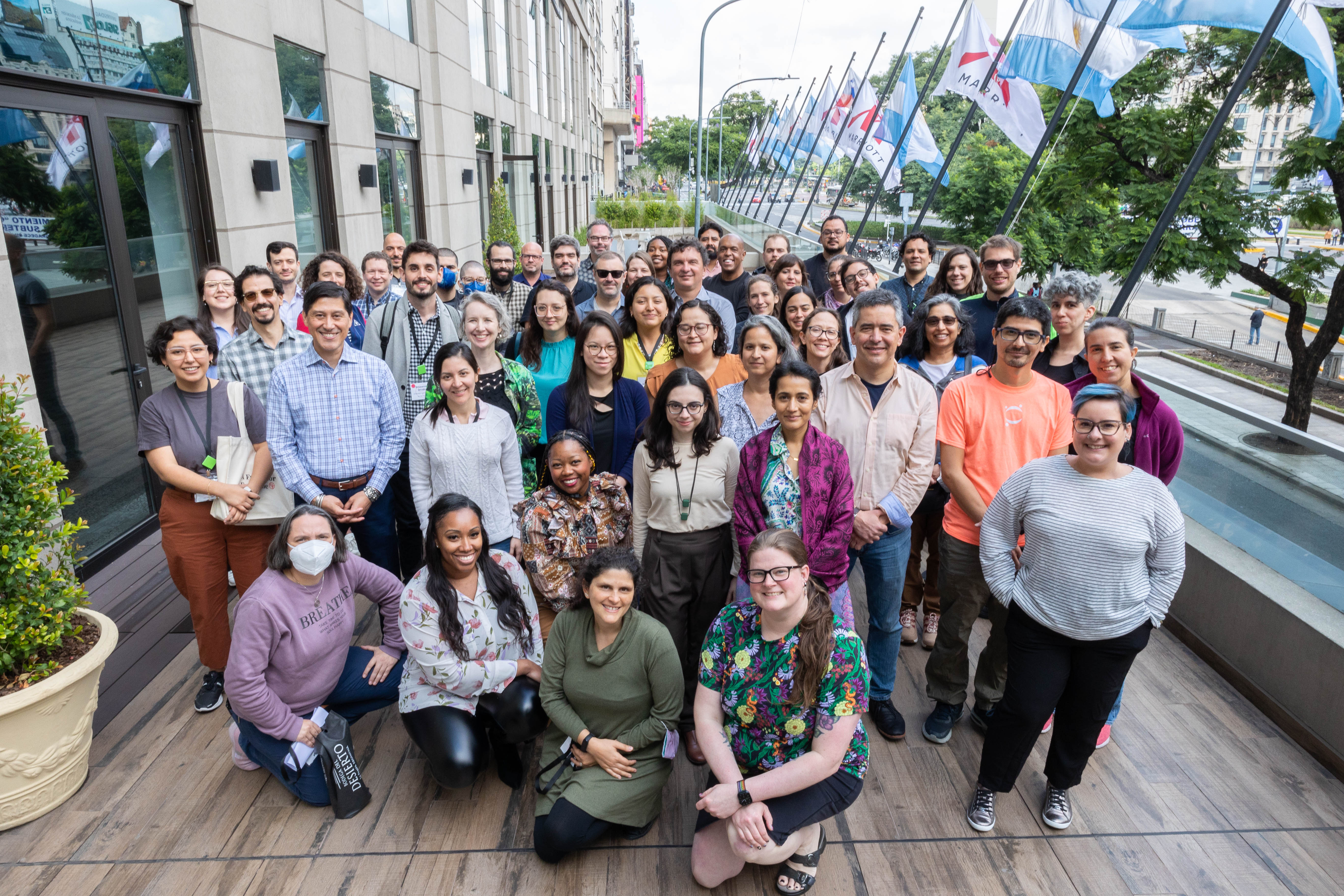
CZI workshop in Buenos Aires, Argentina, to discuss open science in computational biology in Latin America

The Chan Zuckerberg Initiative has also invested in the development and maintenance of open-source scientific software, with a pledge of US$40 million over 3 years for its Essential Open Source Software for Science (EOSS) program. CZI's Open Science program also supports the preprint servers medRxiv and BioRxiv." Grants included support to projects such as ScientificPython and the visualization library matplotlib. Besides directly funding projects, CZI's Open Science division organizes workshops with grantees and stakeholders outside the United States to foster "global participation in open biomedical research".

=== Diversity, equity, and inclusion (DEI) ===
After the election of Donald Trump as US president and the discontinuation of government diversity, equity, and inclusion (DEI) programs, CZI announced on 10 January 2025 that it would continue its diversity programs. However, on 19 February 2025, CZI COO Marc Malandro sent an email to all employees saying "Given the shifting regulatory and legal landscape, we will no longer have a Diversity, Equity, Inclusion, and Accessibility team at CZI." CZI also cancelled its Diverse Slate Practice, which was intended to ensure that qualified candidates from a diverse set of backgrounds should have access to CZI jobs. Meta had taken similar actions. In 2025 CZI informed programs which could be associated with DEI, including many of their San Mateo County partners, that their funding would not be continued and that they would not be eligible for funding going forward. This was sharply criticized by a number of CZI employees as well as the impacted charities.

== Company form and taxation ==
The Chan Zuckerberg Initiative is not a charitable trust or a private foundation but a limited liability company, and is therefore not a tax-exempt organization as many philanthropies are. As an LLC, the organization has more flexibility in how it addresses its goals, and can invest in for-profit startup companies, can spend money on advocacy initiatives and lobbying, can make political donations, does not have to disclose the pay of its top five executives and has fewer other transparency requirements than a charitable trust. Under this legal structure, Forbes wrote, "Zuckerberg will still control the Facebook shares owned by the Chan Zuckerberg Initiative". The Chan Zuckerberg Initiative publicly lists its grants, a level of transparency not required for an LLC. It pledged in 2020 to release software developed by it or its grantees under open-source licenses.

== See also ==
- Good Ventures, started by Facebook co-founder Dustin Moskovitz and his wife Cari Tuna, who takes care of its day-to-day operations
- Corporate social responsibility
- Philanthropy in the United States
- Philanthrocapitalism
