= Zenab Issa Oki Soumaïne =

Chadian aviator

Captain Zenab Issa Oki
- Born: 1986 (age 39–40)
- Citizenship: Chad
- Occupation: Pilot

Zenab Issa Oki Soumaïne (born 1986) is an aviator and the first woman from Chad to become an aircraft captain.

== Biography ==
Oki graduated with a baccalaureate in 2003, and in 2005 began to study in Sabangali for a degree in finance. She later decided to move to a career in aviation and her first pilot's licence was awarded in Miami for a Hawker 900XPI.
On 3 May 2017 Oki was promoted to captain, becoming the first woman from Chad to captain an aircraft. She studied at Ethiopian Airlines' Pilot Academy and completed 1,500 hours of flight before graduation. At her graduation ceremony, the First Lady of Chad, Hinda Deby Itno, encouraged the audience to give Oki a standing ovation. The ceremony was held at the Hilton Hotel in N’Djamena, the capital and largest city of Chad.

Oki worked for Air Burkina before joining the presidential air fleet in Chad. In 2019 she was employed by the president of Chad as a pilot. Her achievement is seen as a role model for other young women from Chad.
