= Matthew Bishop (journalist) =

American journalist

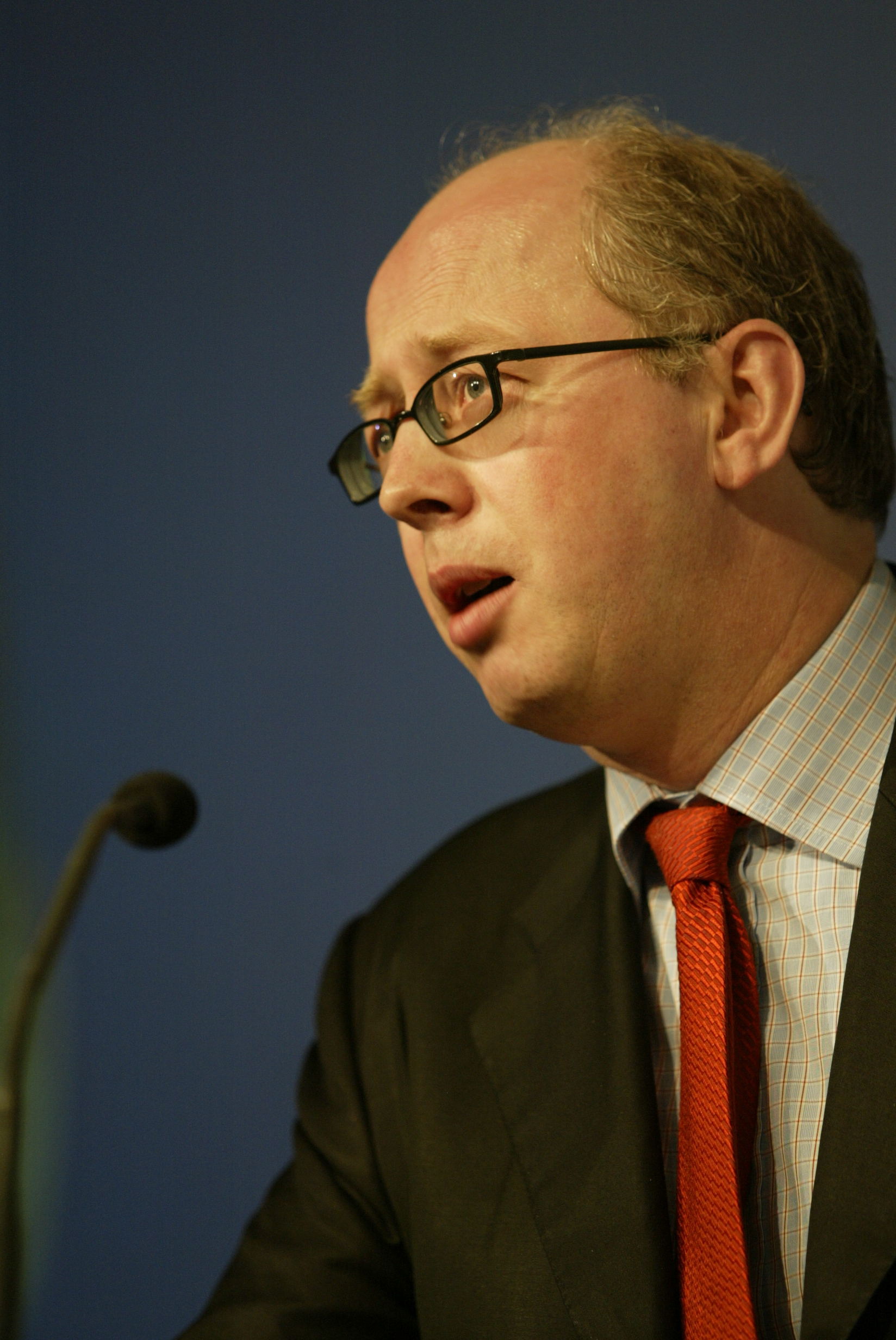
Matthew Bishop in 2005

Matthew Bishop is The Economist U.S. Business Editor and New York Bureau Chief, and a sought after expert on philanthropy. Previously, he was the London-based business editor.

== Early life and education ==
Bishop was educated at Jesus College, Oxford, and was on the faculty at the London Business School. He was an adviser to the United Nations International Year of Microcredit in 2005.

== Bibliography ==
Bishop wrote The Economist guides "The Pocket Economist" and "Essential Economics", passages from which were plagiarised in Saif al-Islam Gaddafi's PhD thesis, in a scandal at the London School of Economics.

He is the also co-author of several books with Michael Green, including: "The Road from Ruin: How to Renew Capitalism and Put America Back on Top", "Philanthrocapitalism: How Giving Can Save the World", and the e-book "In Gold We Trust".
