= Donsin, Gounghin =

Donsin
- Location within Burkina Faso, French West Africa
- Coordinates: 12°03′56.85″N 0°10′12.66″W
- Country: Burkina Faso
- Province: Kouritenga
- Department: Gounghin
- Elevation: 324 m (1,063 ft)

Population (2006)
  - Total: 492
- Time zone: UTC+0 (GMT)

Donsin, also spelt Donsen, is a commune in the Gounghin Department of Kouritenga Province in the Centre-Est region of Burkina Faso. It had a population of 492 in 2006.

== Demographics ==
Year	Population
1985	468
1996	638
2006	492

=== Neighbourhoods ===
Neighbourhood	Population (2006)
Kambandonsin	81
Natenga	163
Sambstenga	69
Tensobtenga	179
