= Thomas Sankara International Airport Ouagadougou =

International Airport of Ouagadougou, Burkina Faso

Thomas Sankara International Airport Ouagadougou Aéroport International Thomas Sankara Ouagadougou
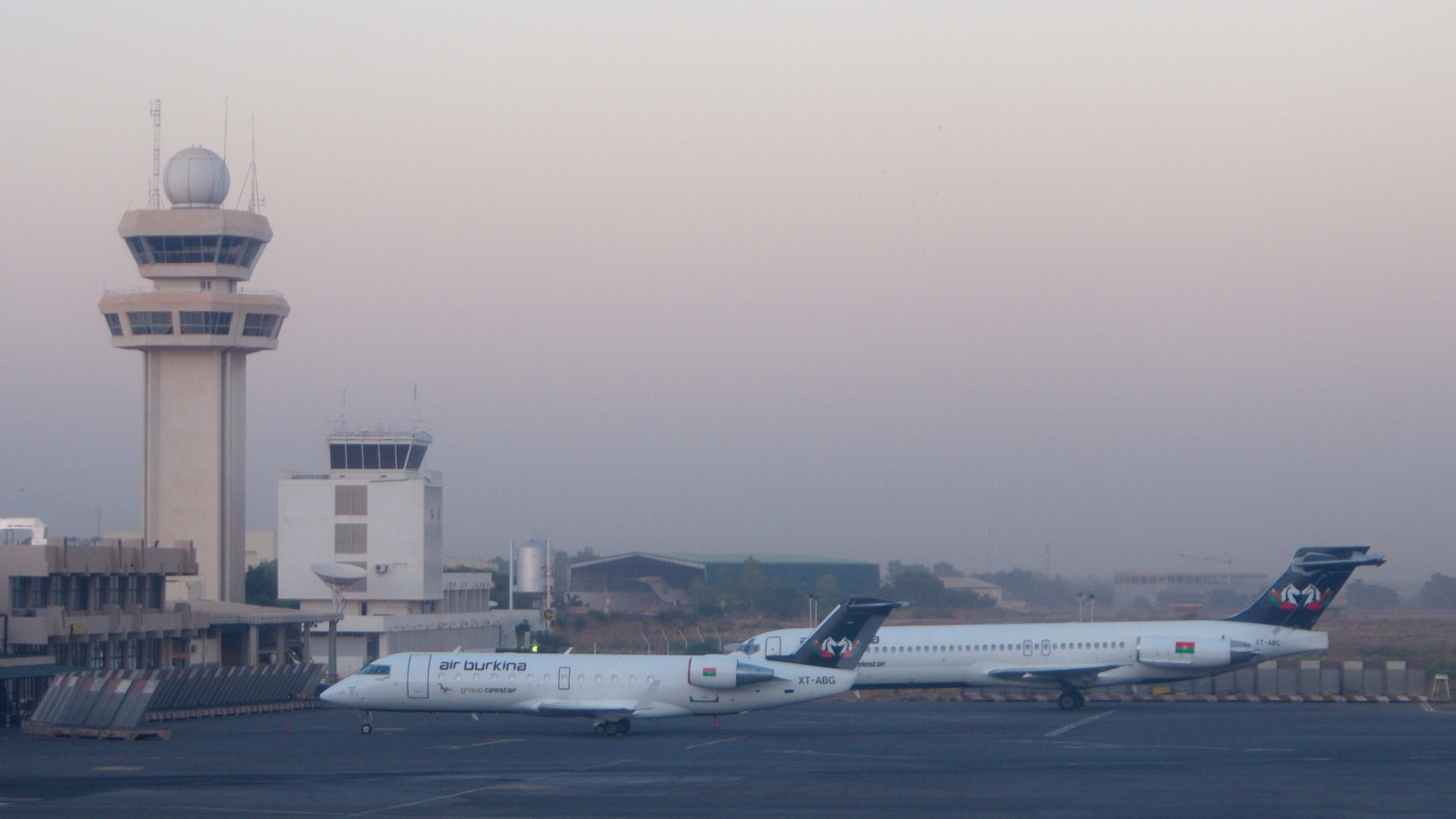
- IATA: OUA; ICAO: DFFD

Summary
- Airport type: Public / military
- Serves: Ouagadougou
- Location: Ouagadougou, Burkina Faso
- Hub for: Air Burkina
- Time zone: Greenwich Mean Time (UTC±00:00)
- Elevation AMSL: 1,037 ft (316 m)
- Coordinates: 12°21′11″N 01°30′44″W
- Website: www.aeroport-ouagadougou.com

Map
- Location of the airport in Burkina Faso

Runways
Direction	Length		Surface
Direction	m	ft	Surface
04/22	3,028	9,934	Asphalt

Statistics (2020)
- Passengers: 245,280
- Source

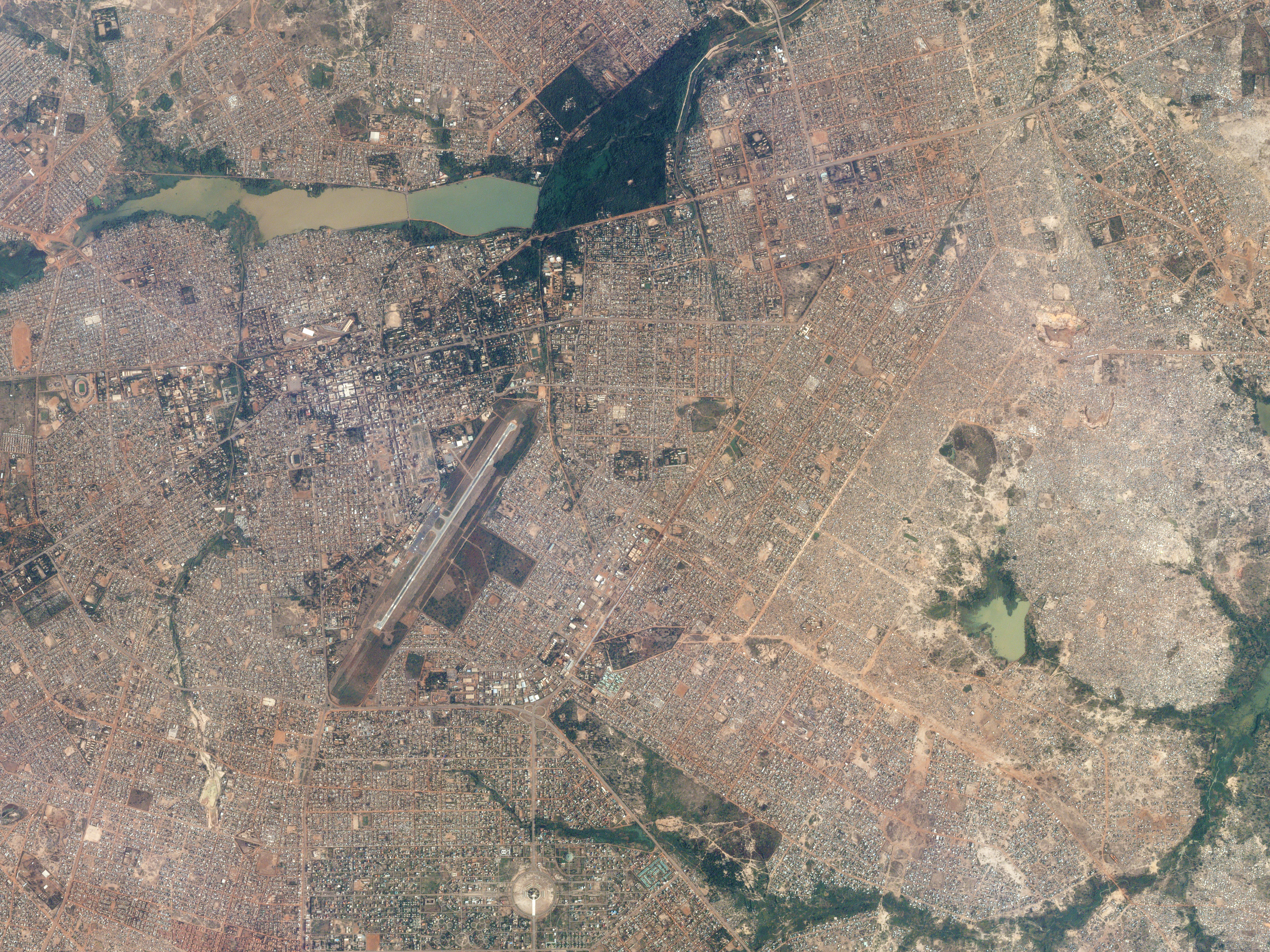
Aerial photograph of Ouagadougou with airport runway visible at centre

Thomas Sankara International Airport Ouagadougou (IATA: OUA, ICAO: DFFD) is an international airport serving Ouagadougou, the capital of Burkina Faso. It was built in the 1960s, and it is approximately 1.5 kilometres (1 mi) southeast of the main commercial area. The site itself is approximately 4.8 kilometres (3.0 mi) in length, 0.5 kilometres (0.31 mi) in width at its narrowest point, and covers an area of approximately 4.26 km^{2} (1,050 acres). Its runway is 3,000 metres (9,800 ft) long. When the airport was built it was on the southern boundary of the city. Ouagadougou has since experienced rapid urbanization and the airport is now surrounded by urban development.

Besides having outgrown its capacity constraints, Ouagadougou Airport is a source of pollution and risk. The government has plans for a new airport 30 km north of the capital.

In addition to civilian traffic, the airport has a military sector.

Ouagadougou Airport handles about 98% of all scheduled commercial air traffic in Burkina Faso. Air Burkina and Air France handle about 60% of scheduled passenger traffic. Between 2005 and 2011, air passenger traffic at Ouagadougou airport grew at an average annual rate of 7.0%, reaching about 404,726 passengers in 2011 and was estimated to reach 850,000 by 2025.

In 2007 it was the 15th busiest airport in West Africa in passenger volume, just ahead of Port Harcourt (Nigeria) and behind Banjul (Gambia).

The total air cargo grew 71% from 4,350 tons in 2005 to about 7,448 tons in 2009.

== Airlines and destinations ==
Airlines	Destinations
Africa World Airlines	Accra
Air Algérie	Algiers
Air Burkina	Accra, Bamako, Bobo-Dioulasso, Cotonou, Dakar–Diass, Lomé, Niamey
Air Cairo	Cairo, Dakar–Diass
Air Côte d'Ivoire	Abidjan, Niamey
Air France	Paris–Charles de Gaulle
Air Senegal	Dakar–Diass
ASKY Airlines	Bamako, Conakry, Lomé, Niamey
Brussels Airlines	Brussels
Ethiopian Airlines	Addis Ababa, Conakry, Niamey
Kangala Air Express	Bobo-Dioulasso, Niamey
Royal Air Maroc	Casablanca
Tunisair	Abidjan, Tunis
Turkish Airlines	Conakry, Freetown, Istanbul

== Military use ==
According to a 2012 article in the Washington Post, the United States military was using the military side of the airport as the hub of its airborne intelligence operations for much of Western Africa. Its surveillance operations were carried out mainly with small, unarmed turboprop aircraft disguised as private planes, but full of surveillance equipment. The U.S. spy planes fly hundreds of kilometres north to Mali, Mauritania and the Sahara, where they search for Al-Qaida fighters from the Maghreb. The planes refuel on isolated airstrips favored by African bush pilots, extending their effective flight range by thousands of kilometres. According to the Washington Post, in 2012 Ouagadougou was the most important of the approximately dozen air bases that the U.S. established in Africa since 2007.

== Plans for a new airport ==
The government plans to close the current airport upon construction of the Ouagadougou-Donsin Airport, approximately 35 km (22 mi) northeast of Ouagadougou near the village of Donsin. It was originally expected to be completed around 2018, and the government of Burkina Faso has an $85 million loan from the World Bank to help finance the construction. The government of Burkina Faso believed that the project would cost $618 million. Construction started in 2021 for completion in 2025.

== Accidents and incidents ==
- On 17 September 2013, a standing ATR 72-202 (EC-LNP) of Colombe Air Line leased from Helitt Lineas Aereas was substantially damaged when a heavy thunderstorm passed over the airport, with winds up to 44 knots (50.6 mph) being registered at 20:00. The plane was written off.
