= Air Mali (2005) =

Airline of Mali (2005–2012)

IATA	ICAO	Call sign
I5	CMM	CAMALI
- Founded: April 2005 (as CAM); May 2009 (as Air Mali)
- Commenced operations: 7 June 2005 (as CAM); 15 May 2009 (as Air Mali)
- Ceased operations: December 2012
- Hubs: Modibo Keita International Airport
- Alliance: Celestair
- Fleet size: 3
- Headquarters: Bamako, Mali

Air Mali, formerly Compagnie Aérienne du Mali (abbreviated as CAM), was an airline based in Mali that was formed by the Aga Khan Fund for Economic Development (AKFED) through its subsidiary IPS, West Africa and the government of Mali in April 2005.

Due to the Northern Mali conflict, the airline's operations have been suspended since December 2012.

== History ==
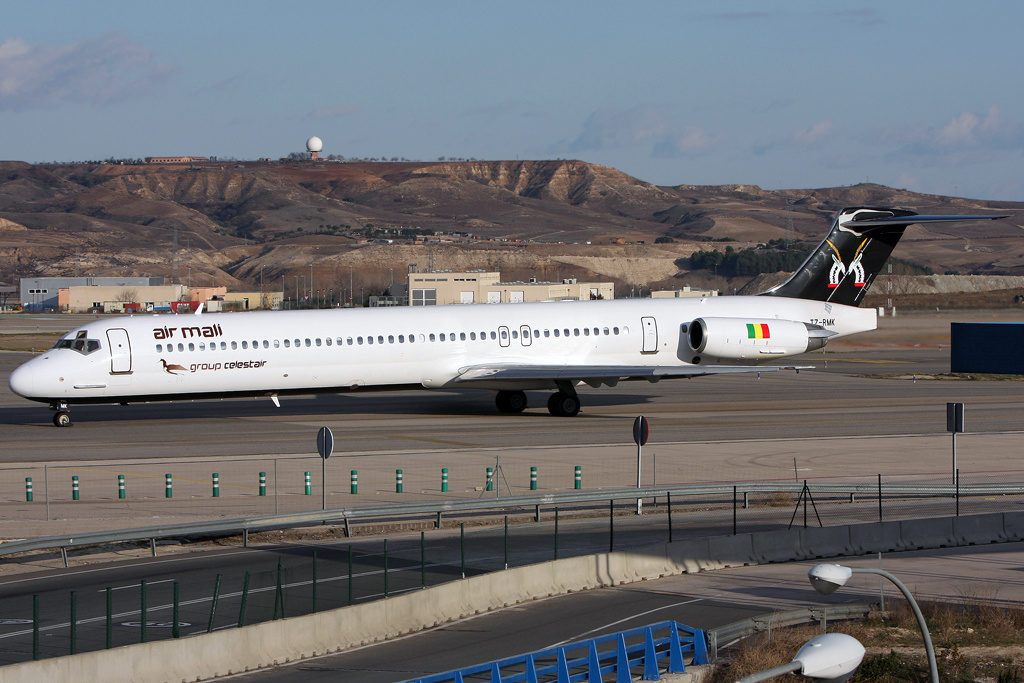
Air Mali MD-83 at Madrid Barajas Airport in 2010

CAM made its inaugural flight on 7 June 2005 from Bamako to Mopti and then to Gao, and back, with a Dash 8. The initial aim was to focus on Mali's internal network.

The company rebranded itself as Air Mali on 15 May 2009.

In July 2012, following the civil war within Mali, the airline was forced to ground their McDonnell Douglas MD-83 and McDonnell Douglas MD-87 aircraft, and decided to cease all operations on December 27, 2012. All employees were released from their duties with immediate effect, but were informed that the airline management would reassess the situation in September 2013. As of 2015, the airline was still incorporated, but not active; and no signs of a resumption in flying were to be seen.

== Corporate affairs ==
=== Ownership ===
Shareholdings (as at August 2013) were:

Shareholder	Interest
Aga Khan Fund for Economic Development	94%
Government of Mali	2%
The Agora Company, Mali (la Société Agora Mali)	2%
Other shareholders	2%
Total	100%

=== Business trends ===
Financial and other business figures for Air Mali are not available, as the company is privately owned.

=== Head office ===
Air Mali was/is headquartered in the Immeuble Tomota in Bamako, Mali,

== Fleet ==
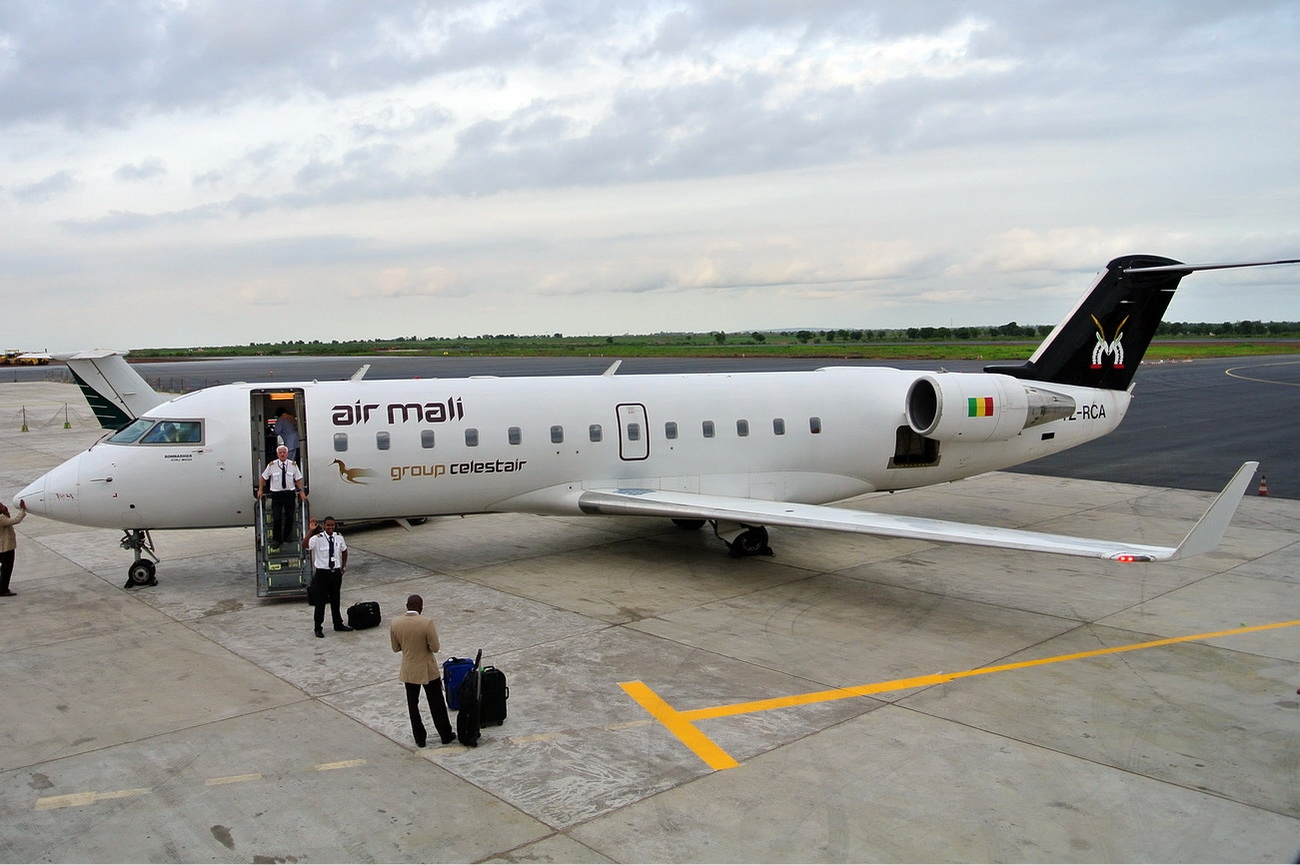
Air Mali's Bombardier CRJ200 at Bamako–Sénou International Airport in July 2013

At the time of grounding on December 27, 2012, Air Mali fleet consisted of the following aircraft:

Air Mali fleet
Aircraft	In fleet	Notes
McDonnell Douglas MD-83	1	Grounded since July 2012
McDonnell Douglas MD-87	1	Grounded since July 2012
Bombardier CRJ200	1	Stored since December 2012
Total	3	

== See also ==
- Air Mali (1960–1989)
