= Aga Khan Fund for Economic Development =

Swiss for-profit entity

- Founded: 1984; 42 years ago
- Founder: Aga Khan IV
- Headquarters: Geneva, Switzerland
- Revenue: ▲US$4.3 billion (2017)
- Number of employees: 47,000 (2017)
- Website: AKFED

Aga Khan Fund for Economic Development SA is a Swiss for-profit entity and international development finance institution which invests in countries of East Africa, West Africa, Central Asia, and South Asia. It is based in Geneva, Switzerland. It was founded by Aga Khan IV and is part of the Aga Khan Development Network.

== History ==
Aga Khan Fund for Economic Development (AKFED) was founded in 1984 and is a part of Aga Khan Development Network (AKDN). It consists of more than 150 companies and is active in 15 countries which employs more than 30,000 people. The agency works to build infrastructures that support economic development. Its major investments include the Financial Services, Industrial Promotion Services (IPS) and Tourism Promotion Services (TPS). These initiatives span improvements in banking, electricity, agriculture, hotels, aviation, and communications linkages.

AKFED provides a living for millions of people, in particular in the agribusiness sector. For example, AKFED developed green bean farming in Kenya by providing 50,000 farmers with technical assistance and buying their produce for export to Europe. The company has 2,000 employees, turns a profit, and indirectly provides a living for 500,000 people.

In conjunction with the governments of certain developing countries, AKFED operates to promote the private sector. Through the support of industries, the agency aims to bolster the participation of developing regions in market economies. In addition, essential to sustaining development initiatives is a stable human resource bank from which to draw support. To this end, AKFED provides training in administrative, managerial, and marketing skills with the aim of fostering locally owned enterprises. Where capital is unavailable, the agency provides the initial investment for companies through the use of microloans. As a for-profit organisation, however, AKFED conducts its businesses as a standard employer with ups and downs associated with financial results.

== Companies and subsidiaries ==
AKFED operates in conjunction with private donors, international economic organizations and individual governments to address constraints and hindrances to development. Working primarily in Africa and Asia, the agency encourages the growth of industry and infrastructure in order for developing regions to generate the capital necessary for investment into AKFED's many projects and more generally, for a country's growth.

Since the 1960s, the agency has supported a group of enterprises under the Industrial Promotion Services (IPS), each of which was conceptualized to spur investment and increase activity in the corporate sectors of developing countries. However, with the international climate largely favouring countries with export-oriented economies in place of popular import substitution industrialization (ISI), IPS adjusted its approach. The changes would include an emphasis upon privatization and the agency embarked on its goal with a new approach in the 1980s. Private enterprises and entrepreneurs became generators for capital investment into agribusiness and infrastructure, both crucial to the development process.

=== Financial services ===
Operating in East Africa, Central Asia and South Asia, AKFED supports the creation of financial institutions including banks and insurance groups within these regions. The agency is a major supporter of corporate activity and is a prime lender for local business both in Bangladesh and the Kyrgyz Republic where it founded the Kyrgyz Investment and Credit Bank (KICB).

One of the agency's earliest holdings was the Diamond Trust Bank of Kenya and Uganda, founded in 1930, the aim of which was to use locally generated funds to create loans for small business and the construction of homes. Soon after, Jubilee Insurance Group joined the agency's banks in East Africa. In India, the agency became an important shareholder for the Development Credit Bank Ltd. In 2004, AKFED acquired holdings in Pakistan's largest private-sector financial institution, HBL.

=== Food and agriculture ===
In the domain of food and agriculture, IPS facilitates agricultural extension to farmers, in order to make possible their participation in global markets. Using a participatory programme of education and technical skills training for farmers, IPS supports the rural economies of developing countries by facilitating exports to developed regions. For the initial costs of such production until harvest revenues are generated, microloans are provided to farmers by non-profit agencies of the AKDN. In addition to microfinance and education, the agency works to improve the health and sanitation conditions of its beneficiaries, and considers employee welfare to be of paramount concern, providing equitable opportunity between genders and making child-care provisions for its employees. One of IPS' companies is Frigoken, which is Kenya's largest vegetable processor.

=== Infrastructure ===
Within the IPS, AKFED operates in conjunction with international economic organizations, private donors and individual governments to resolve issues of electricity and water supply, as well as communications infrastructure.

Private enterprises in the form of power plants have been a major project of the agency, through which it invested in the largest plant within sub-Saharan Africa, Azito Energy. The project's counterpart in Kenya, is Mombasa’s Tsavo Power plant. In neighbouring Uganda, the agency is working to establish the critical Bujagali Hydro Power Project. Currently, the agency is working to establish the Pamir power plant in Tajikistan, the aim of which is to reinvigorate the country's economy and resolve electricity inadequacies.

AKFED's first telecommunications initiative is known as Indigo, a GSM mobile phone project based in Tajikistan. An important aspect of the reconstruction and development process, the agency embarked on its second mobile phone initiative in Afghanistan (mobile network operators in Afghanistan). Today the country's company, Roshan (telco) has expanded to create over 500 jobs for the country.

AKFED owns 51% of the Roshan (telco) cellphone network in Afghanistan. Started in 2003, it is the largest commercial wireless operator in Afghanistan.

=== Tourism development ===
The Tourism Promotion Services, known as TPS, aims at creating sustainable tourist attractions in underdeveloped communities. Paying attention to cultural values as well as environmental issues, TPS creates a wide variety of tourist facilities that generate sustainable community capital, stimulate local economic growth and promote positive investment opportunities.

Under the brand name Serena, TPS constructs and maintains a multitude of resorts, hotels and other tourist attractions that serve to stimulate local economic growth through increased employment, development of a skilled workforce, increased productivity of local businesses (particularly in the design and craft spheres) and the general development of given areas. In all of these aspects, emphasis is placed on the active employment and input of the local community.

In regions that are neglected by commercial tourism corporations, TPS aims to develop facilities that meet the international standards for hospitality, accommodation and service. Attention to such factors further promotes economic growth as well as the potential for local business development within less-frequented regions.

While seeking to stimulate economic growth and generate sustainable capital, TSP aims at protecting and maintaining the local environment.

=== Media services ===
Aga Khan founded the Kenya's major media service, the Nation Media Group in 1960. In the year's leading up to Kenya's independence, Nation Media's predecessors, Taifa and Nation newspapers, served as vehicles of independent opinion. Today, the group operates nationwide newspapers in English and Swahili languages, as well as radio and television stations. At present, the group has expanded to serve Uganda and Tanzania also.

=== Aviation services ===
The Aviation division of the foundation is dedicated to providing support to the existing aviation infrastructure, which serves to support various projects of economic development. By providing worker training, investment knowledge and general management guidance, the division seeks to strengthen existing airline companies and provide them with efficient equipment and resources.

In areas such as Mali, the division supports previously existing airlines by increasing fleet size and reviving currently non-functional companies in order to provide much-needed air support for the development projects within the region. In Uganda, a new airline, Air Uganda, formed in 2007 and ended in 2014, filled a void that had been vacant since the national airline, Uganda Airlines, collapsed in May 2001. In addition, the multiple airline companies of AKFED are connected through a network known as Group Celestair, which serves to collectively increase the efficiency and scope of support for the various airlines throughout the region.
