= Charitable for-profit entity =

Type of organization

A charitable for-profit entity is an organization with a charitable mission but legally organized as a for-profit corporation. Both benefit corporations and Low-profit limited liability companies (L3C) fall under this category. As well as generating a profit, a charitable for-profit entity concentrates on setting a social objective. The business must achieve its social purpose, as well as make a profit, to be successful. There are movements to refine strategies, retuning community-oriented activities based on ROI of Little Investment or Small Capital, Low Risk, yet, higher return (impacts and outcomes; both in social and economic factors) and rebranding nonprofit entities from wholly-dependable funding beneficiary from Governments or public i.e. business organization or individual. previously, we often heard of Nonprofits and community-based organizations, now, For-profits community-based Social Enterprises The case of organizing charitable work under for-profit rules rather than as a traditional charity such as a foundation gained prominence when Google announced its Google.org branch in 2006. Since then, the subject has been under both academic and public debate with U.S. law professor Eric Posner arguing in favor of expanding Charity law to include for-profit charities, while Brian Galle considered the legislative popularity of social enterprises a "race to the bottom among states competing to siphon away federal tax dollars for local businesses."

== Legal forms ==
=== Benefit corporations ===
When a company is created under corporate law it is called a benefit corporation. This differs from a ‘B Corp’ which is qualified by B Lab to meet detailed standards for social and environmental performance.

Being a benefit corporation can be very beneficial for the company as it allows them to legally protect their social goals by concentrating on other sectors rather than only considering profit. This allows the business to concentrate on all stakeholders and take into consideration of their interests, which can help them solve social and environmental challenges. The demand for corporate accountability is increasing and therefore benefiting corporations can differentiate their company from other leading companies by concentrating on these customers.

There can be many drawbacks of a benefit corporation such as expanded reporting requirements. This provides shareholders of the business with sufficient information to determine whether your business is achieving its purpose and goals. A benefit corporation must produce an annual report for each of its shareholders so that the company can be assessed by a third party. The report will have to include the efforts that have been made in order to achieve a general public benefit and will all have to be stated on the annual report that should be available on the company website.

=== Low-profit limited liability company ===
A low-profit limited liability company (L3C) is a low limited liability company that has a set mission of being socially beneficial, similarly to the way a non-profit company has also. However, a nonprofit company will not distribute its profits the way a for-profit company does.
A limited liability company takes advantage of both nonprofit and for profit sources of capital. An L3C can attract a diverse group of creditors to finance its operations, including private foundations and socially conscious for-profit entities.

== Differences between charitable for-profit entity and not-for-profit charities ==
Charities are organizations that are set up to provide help and raise money for those in need. Traditional charities aim to provide a service to the needy with no profits earned for the owners of the organization. All the money that is donated to the organization is used for the purpose of the business and is used to pursue their objectives. A charity is founded to serve a humanitarian or environmental need to the public.

A charitable for-profit entity however differs from this as the organization will aim for a profit whilst still providing similar services as a charity. The for-profit entity may also be directed by a sole proprietor, while a non-profit organization needs a board of directors. Like any other for-profit organization, it will base its accounting on the quarterly income, whereas a non-profit charity will purely focus on the activities carried out.

A large majority of businesses will usually concentrate on the financial benefits of its owners and shareholders when setting up a business. The main aim of most businesses, including charitable for-profit entities, are to generate some sort of profit for the business. By producing profit, the charitable for-profit entity is able to continue its work to a high standard and also pay the stakeholders of the company. Charitable for-profit entities will however have to pay taxes on the profit that is made. This differs from a traditional (non-profit) charity because they do not have to pay taxes as no profit is generated for themselves.

If a charitable for-profit entity was to go out of business, its assets can be liquidated and the proceedings will be distributed to the shareholders of the business. However, if a charity was to go out of business it would have to distribute its assets to another non-profit organization.

== Similarities between charitable for-profit entity and not-for-profit charities ==
Although there are many differences between charitable for-profit entities and traditional charities, they do hold some similarities that can be said to be quite major. Both will have a strong vision in what they want from the business overall. Both will therefore have similar strategic plans in order to get the best out of the business regardless of their aims and objectives being different to an extent. For-profit entities and non-profit charities will both strive to meet their objectives that are laid out on their mission statements. They are both given limited funds, so will therefore have to aim to meet their goals with the funds provided.
