= Melchior Ndadaye International Airport =

Airport in Burundi

Melchior Ndadaye International Airport Aéroport international Melchior Ndadaye Ikibuga c'indege mpuzamakungu Melchior Ndadaye
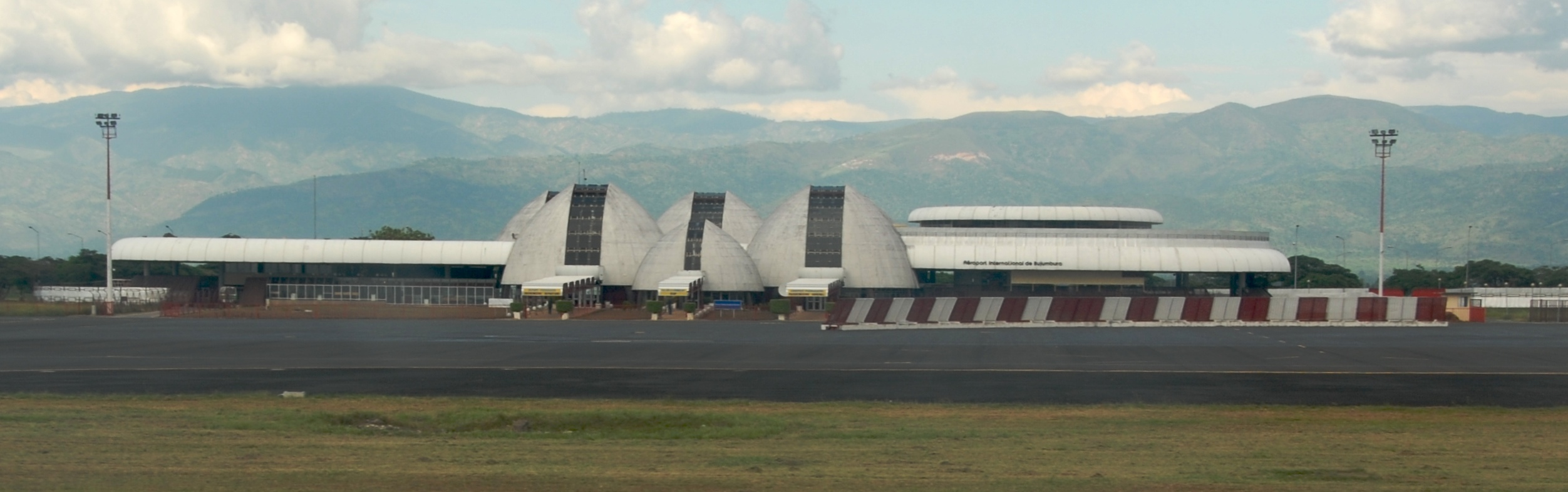
- View of the airport
- IATA: BJM; ICAO: HBBA

Summary
- Airport type: Public
- Owner: Government of Burundi
- Serves: Bujumbura, Burundi
- Opened: 1952
- Elevation AMSL: 2,582 ft (787 m)
- Coordinates: 03°19′26″S 029°19′07″E
- Website: aacb.bi

Map
- Location of airport in Burundi. Placement on map is approximate.

Runways
Direction	Length		Surface
Direction	ft	m	Surface
17/35	11,811	3,600	Asphalt

Statistics (2017)
- Passengers (arrivals): 131, 477

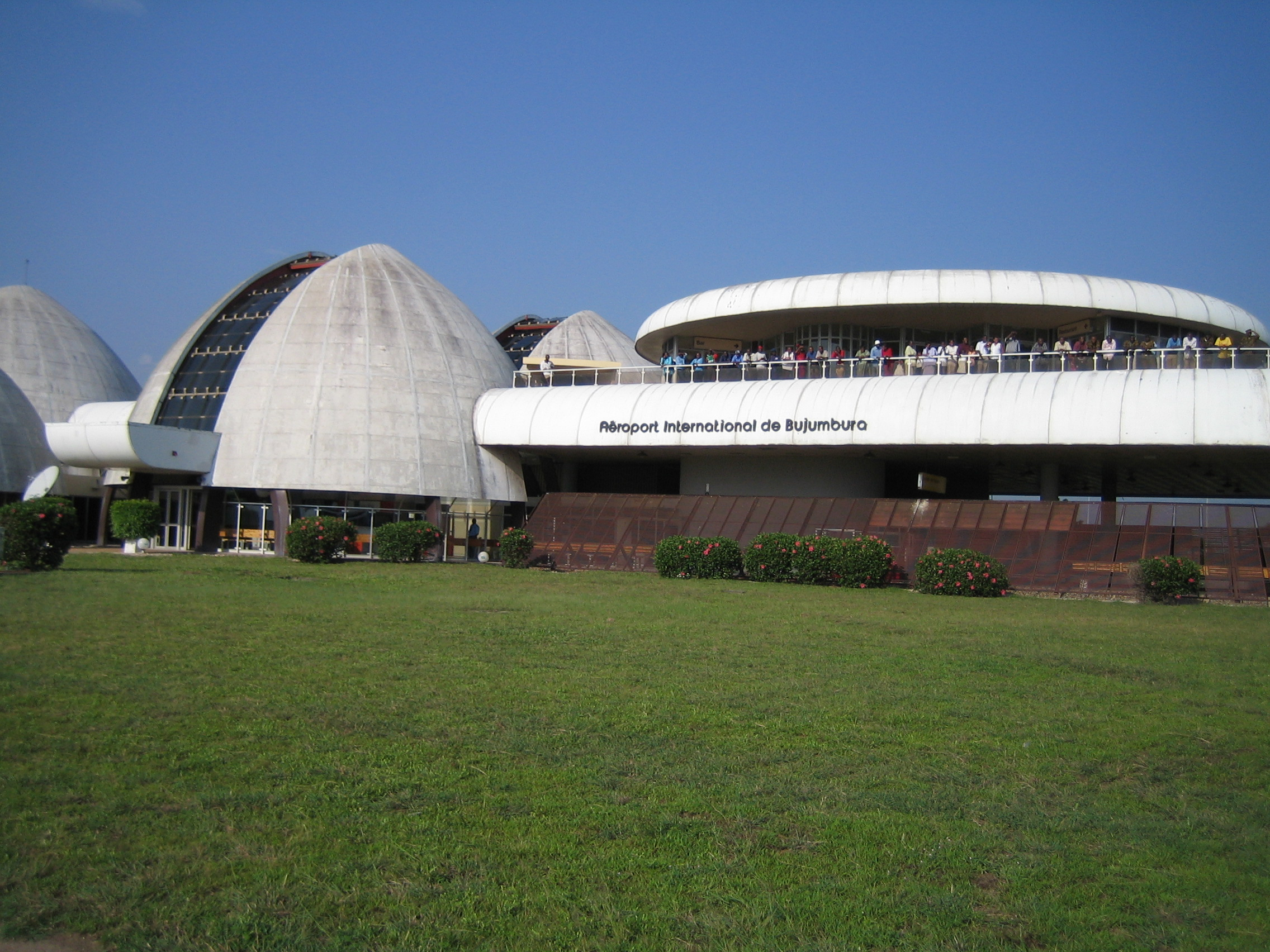
Melchior Ndadaye International Airport

Melchior Ndadaye International Airport (IATA: BJM, ICAO: HBBA) is an airport in Bujumbura, the former capital and current economic capital of Burundi. It is Burundi's only international airport and the only one with a paved runway.

== History ==
The airport was opened in 1952. On 1 July 2019, the airport was renamed Melchior Ndadaye International Airport after the first democratically elected president of Burundi who was murdered in a coup d'état in October 1993, three months after being elected. This event sparked the decade-long Burundian Civil War.

== Location ==
The airport is in the extreme northwest of Bujumbura Mairie Province. It is bounded by Bujumbura Rural Province to the north and west, by the RN4 coastal highway running along the shore of Lake Tanganyika to the south, and by the Mutimbuzi River and the RN5 highway to the east. The Mpanda River, a tributary of the Ruzizi River, flows past the north end of the airport.

In October 2018 the Burundi Civil Aviation Authority began dredging the Mutimbuzi River to prevent it from flooding into the airport. Drains would also be installed to prevent flooding. Removal of alluvium and other waste from the river would begin downstream and continue up to the NR5 highway from Bujumbura to Rugombo. In May 2021 the Mpanda River threatened to break the dam that protects the infrastructure of the Melchior Ndadaye International Airport.

Since August 2024, the airport has been undergoing a major renovation, expansion, and modernization project, carried out in two phases as part of Sino-Burundian cooperation. The first phase includes the runway extension, the rehabilitation of the aircraft movement and parking areas, and the construction of a new control tower along with the acquisition of its technical equipment. The second phase of the project will focus on further modernization work, including the construction of a new passenger terminal, among other complementary infrastructure.

Additionally, the airport underwent further modernization works, including the construction of a new check-in hall to expand the existing facilities, as well as general renovation and insulation improvements. The project was carried out by the Turkish company Balcıoğlu Construction.

== Airlines and destinations ==
As of December 2018, the following airlines maintained regular scheduled service to Bujumbura International Airport:

=== Passenger ===
Airlines	Destinations
Air Tanzania	Dar es Salaam
Brussels Airlines	Brussels
Ethiopian Airlines	Addis Ababa, Goma
Kenya Airways	Nairobi–Jomo Kenyatta
RwandAir	Kigali
Uganda Airlines	Entebbe

=== Cargo ===
Airlines	Destinations
Ethiopian Airlines Cargo	Addis Ababa, Kigali

== See also ==
- Air Burundi
- Burundi Airlines

== Sources ==
- Hicintuka, Jean-Marie (3 October 2018), "Démarrage des travaux de curage de la rivière Mutimbuzi pour protéger l'aéroport international de Bujumbura", Agence Burundaise de Presse (in French)
- Isenge, Baudouin (3 May 2021), "Visite de terrain sur la digue protégeant les infrastructures de l'Aéroport International Melchior NDANDAYE.", Ministry of Finance (in French)
- "Way: Bujumbura International Airport (86783340)", OpenStreetMap
