= Priscilla Chan =

American pediatrician and philanthropist (born 1985)

Priscilla Chan Zuckerberg
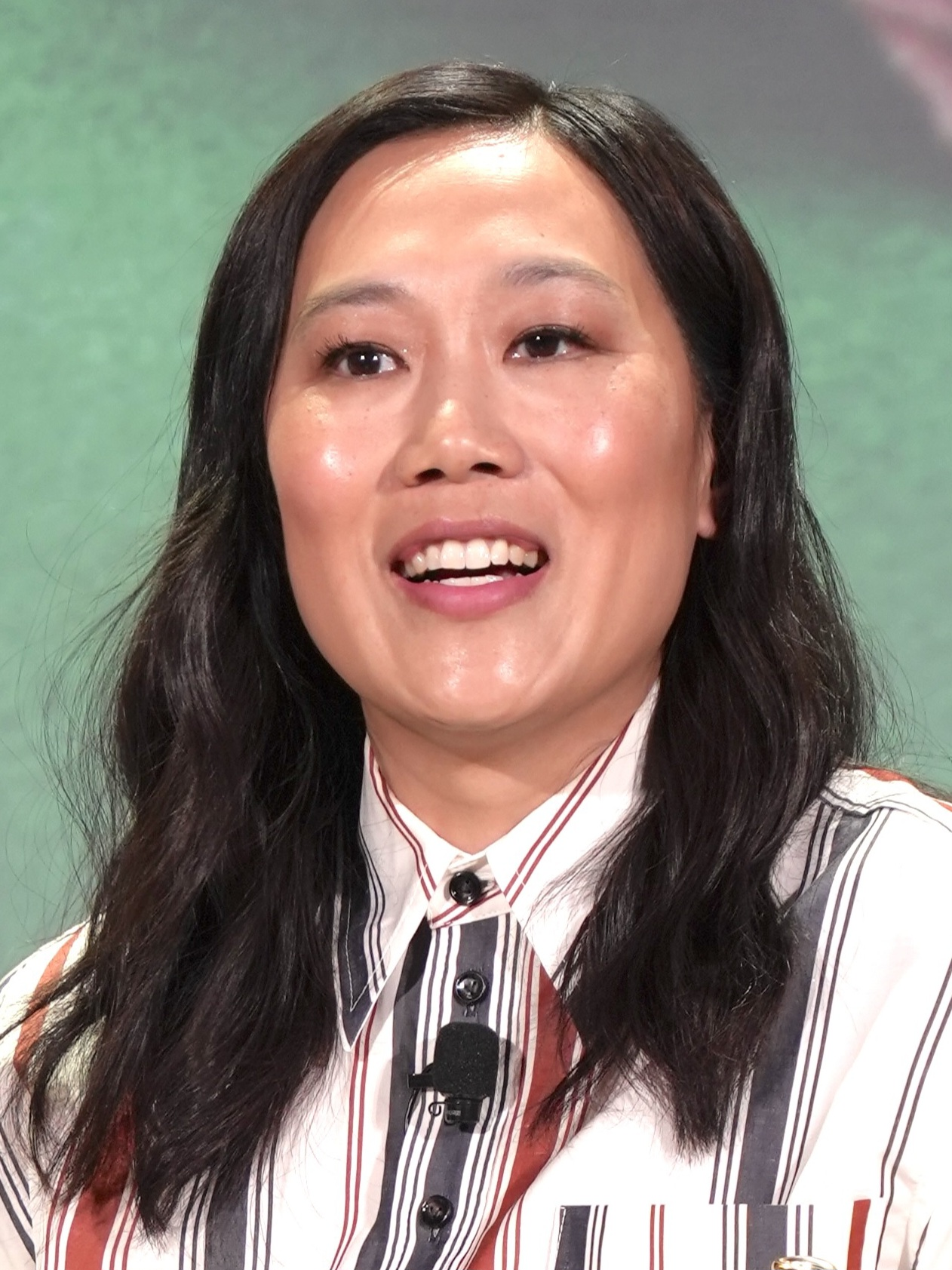
- Chan at SXSW in 2025
- Born: February 24, 1985 (age 41); Braintree, Massachusetts, U.S.
- Education: Harvard University (BS); University of California, San Francisco (MD)
- Occupations: Pediatrician; philanthropist
- Title: Co-founder and co-CEO of Chan Zuckerberg Initiative
- Spouse: Mark Zuckerberg (m. 2012)
- Children: 3

Priscilla Chan Zuckerberg (née Chan; born February 24, 1985) is an American pediatrician and philanthropist. Chan has been married to Mark Zuckerberg, co-founder and chief executive of Meta Platforms, since May 2012. In December 2015, Chan and Zuckerberg founded the Chan Zuckerberg Initiative with a pledge to transfer 99 percent of their Meta shares, then valued at $45 billion, to venture capital and philanthropic initiatives.

== Early life ==
Chan was born in Braintree, Massachusetts, and grew up in Quincy, Massachusetts. Her parents were ethnic Chinese refugees who fled Vietnam in boats. Chan grew up speaking Cantonese and interpreted for her grandparents who raised her and her two younger sisters, Michelle and Elaine, while her parents worked. Chan's father owned a restaurant near Boston Symphony Hall and Northeastern University in Boston, which he later sold to run a wholesale fish company in 2006. Chan graduated valedictorian of her class from Quincy High School, where she was involved with the FIRST Robotics Competition team #69 HYPER and where she was the captain of the tennis team. Her classmates voted her "Class Genius."

Although her parents were supportive of college education, they were unfamiliar with the process, including the SAT exam. Chan is the first college graduate in her family and has said that "education is an incredibly personal issue" for her, noting that "[i]f you're the first generation to go to college...sometimes you don't realize your potential until others point it out." She credits her public school teachers with recognizing hers and for "getting me excited about learning." Chan attended Harvard University. Feeling out of place at the school, Chan planned to transfer to another institution; however, her involvement with the Franklin Afterschool Enrichment program, specifically an encounter with a young girl who had broken teeth, inspired Chan to stay and to become a pediatrician. Chan once reflected: "I was devastated. I thought, 'What happened? What did I do wrong? I thought at the time, 'I am not enough yet. … I need more skills. I need more power to be able to solve this.' And so, when you're 20 years old and a type-A Harvard student, the answer is medical school."

After graduating in 2007 with a bachelor's degree in biology, she taught 4th and 5th grade science at the private Harker School in San Jose, California, for a year before entering medical school at the University of California, San Francisco, in 2008, where she graduated with a Doctor of Medicine degree in 2012 and then completed residency training in pediatrics in 2015. Chan was a pediatrician at San Francisco General Hospital until 2017.

== Philanthropy ==
Zuckerberg and Chan have pledged about $4.6 billion to charities, including a donation of $75 million to San Francisco General Hospital, where Chan worked. In 2013, they gave 18 million Facebook shares (valued at more than $970 million) to the Silicon Valley Community Foundation. The Chronicle of Philanthropy placed the couple at the top of its list of 50 most generous American philanthropists for that year. They also pledged $120 million to public schools in the San Francisco Bay Area.

On December 1, 2015, Chan and Zuckerberg posted an open Facebook letter to their newborn daughter. They pledged to transfer 99 percent of their Facebook shares, then valued at $45 billion, to the Chan Zuckerberg Initiative (CZI), a limited liability company that focuses on health and education.

In 2016, Chan and CZI co-founded The Primary School, a nonprofit organization that promised to provide K–12 education, prenatal care, early childhood education, primary health care, and other programs and services for free to residents in East Palo Alto, California and the surrounding areas. She served as the emeritus board chair of the school. In 2022, The Primary School received approximately $8 million in donations, and in 2023, the school recorded nearly $4 million in contributions. In April 2025, CZI announced that it was closing The Primary School's East Palo Alto and San Leandro (East Bay) campuses at the end of the 2025–2026 school year "due to a lack of funding". Chan did not attend meetings announcing the tuition-free school's closure, and parents are uncertain about what's next for their children. As part of the school's closure announcement, CZI pledged $50 million over five years to "parent engagement programs, early childhood education and health care services" in "the East Palo Alto, Belle Haven, and East Bay communities".

Chan handles CZI's day-to-day operations. Her charitable goals focus on education, healthcare, and science, which are closely tied to her personal background. She is considered to have had a strong influence on the philanthropy of her husband. She was one of six nominated for the San Francisco Chronicle's third annual Visionary of the Year award in March 2017. The award honors leaders who strive to make the world a better place and also drive change by employing new, innovative business practices.

Critiques have been made regarding CZI, as it often tries to solve problems caused by social media, including Zuckerberg's very own social media platforms.

== Personal life ==
Chan first met Mark Zuckerberg, the future co-founder and CEO of Facebook, at a fraternity party during her freshman year at Harvard University in 2003. The pair married on May 19, 2012, the day following Facebook's IPO. They have three daughters, born 2015, 2017, and 2023. According to a Facebook post by Zuckerberg, Chan was a Buddhist. However, according to an Instagram post by Zuckerberg in 2023, Chan converted to Judaism in 2022.

In 2024, a 7-foot-tall (2.1 m) green and silver statue of Chan commissioned by her husband Mark Zuckerberg was unveiled on Zuckerberg's Instagram account. The statue attracted considerable media attention and a debate as to whether it was a strange gesture.
