= List of Ugandans =

== A ==
- Abdullah Ssekimwanyi, first Ugandan to make the Hajj
- Abigaba Cuthbert Mirembe, member of Parliament
- Abraham Luzzi, businessman and politician
- Alexander Karim, actor
- Alex Isabirye Musongola, football player and manager
- Ali Fadhul, military officer
- Angelina Atyam, human rights activist
- Apolo Kivebulaya, Anglican evangelist and priest
- Aziz Azion, singer-songwriter

== B ==
- Barbara Allimadi, human rights activist
- Bazilio Olara-Okello, military officer and de facto Ugandan head of state
- Beatrice Wabudeya, government official and politician
- Benjamin Joseph Odoki, Supreme Court justice
- Bettinah Tianah, television personality and model
- Betty Bigombe, cabinet minister and World Bank director
- Brian Mushana Kwesiga, Ugandan-born entrepreneur, engineer, and civic leader; former president and CEO, Ugandan North American Association (UNAA)
- Bright Rwamirama, cabinet minister
- Bruno K, musician and guitarist
- Busingye Kabumba, poet and lawyer

== C ==
- Chameleone, musician
- Charles Bakabulindi, cabinet minister
- Charles Mbire, businessman
- Christine Kitumba, Supreme Court justice
- Crispus Kiyonga, cabinet minister and diplomat
- Chris Baryomunsi, cabinet minister

== D ==
- Dan Kimosho, member of Parliament
- Daudi Migereko, cabinet minister
- David Oyite-Ojok, military officer
- David Wakinona, cabinet minister

== E ==
- Emmanuel Kakooza, cabinet minister
- Emmanuel Amey Ojara, surgeon
- Emmanuel Otala, physician and politician
- Emmy Okello, cardiologist
- Eriya Kategaya, lawyer and politician
- Ephraim Kamuntu, scientist and politician
- Ezra Suruma, economist, banker, and academician
- Edward A Bamucwanira, Anglican bishop

== F ==
- Frances Akello, politician, farmer and educator
- Francis Butagira, politician, lawyer, judge and diplomat
- Fred Mukisa, politician and educator
- Fred Omach, politician
- Fred Ruhindi, politician and lawyer

== G ==
- Gabriel Opio, politician
- Gagawala Wambuzi, politician
- Galdino Moro Okello, judge
- George Wilson Kanyeihamba, author, politician and judge
- George K Turyasingura, Anglican bishop
- Geoffrey Oryema, musician
- Gertrude Njuba, politician
- Gilbert Bukenya, seventh Vice President of Uganda
- Godfrey Binaisa, fifth President of Uganda
- Godfrey Mugisha, footballer
- Godliver Businge, civil engineer
- Fred Gisa Rwigyema, military officer

== H ==
- Hamis Kiggundu, businessman, lawyer and author
- Henry Bagiire, politician and educator
- Henry Morton Stanley, journalist and explorer
- Henry Mzili Mujunga, painter
- Henry Oryem Okello, politician and lawyer
- Hilary Onek, politician
- Hope Mwesigye, politician and lawyer

== I ==
- Idi Amin Dada, politician and military officer
- Irfan Afridi, cricketer
- Isaac Musumba, politician and lawyer

== J ==
- James Baba, politician and diplomat
- James Munange Ogoola, lawyer and judge
- James Wapakhabulo, politician and lawyer
- Janani Luwum, archbishop
- Janet Museveni, politician and First Lady of Uganda
- Jane Frances Kuka, politician and activist
- Jeje Odongo, politician
- Jennifer Namuyangu, politician
- Jessica Alupo, politician
- Jessica Eriyo, politician and educator
- John Akii-Bua, hurdler
- John Byabagambi, politician and engineer
- John Kyazze, weightlifter
- John Nasasira, politician
- John Ssebaana Kizito, politician
- John Wilson Nattubu Tsekoko, lawyer and judge
- Joseph Kony, Leader of the Lord's Resistance Army
- Joseph Mulenga, judge
- Joshua Cheptegei, long-distance runner
- James R Tumusiime, author, journalist and entrepreneur

== K ==
- Kabalega, King or Omukama of Bunyoro
- Kamanda Bataringaya, politician
- Robert Kasule Sebunya, politician
- Silver Kayemba, military officer
- John-Mary Kauzya, diplomat
- Ken Lukyamuzi, politician and lawyer
- Grace Kesande Bataringaya, politician
- Kiddu Makubuya, politician, lawyer and academic
- Olive Kigongo, businesswoman
- Beatrice Kiraso, politician
- Kizza Besigye, politician
- Elizabeth Kyazike, archaeologist and cultural heritage researcher

== L ==
- Lilian Mary Nabulime, sculptor and lecturer

== M ==
- Mahmood Mamdani, academic
- Maria Mutagamba, politician and economist
- Margaret Illukol (1954?–2015), Ugandan nurse who survived a disfiguring hyena attack as a girl
- Martin Stephen Egonda-Ntende, judge
- Matia Kasaija, politician and diplomat
- Matthew Lukwiya, physician
- Michael Kawalya Kagwa, politician
- Mildred Barya, writer and poet
- Milton Obote, second Prime minister of Uganda
- Miria Obote, politician and First Lady of Uganda
- Moses Ndiema Kipsiro, long-distance runner
- Muhammad Kibirige Mayanja, politician
- Muljibhai Madhvani, businessman
- Musa Echweru, politician
- Mustafa Adrisi, third Vice President of Uganda
- Joseph Mutaka, sports journalist
- Mutesa I of Buganda, 30th Kabaka of the Kingdom of Buganda
- Mutesa II of Buganda, 35th Kabaka of the Kingdom of Buganda and first President of Uganda
- Paulo Muwanga, politician, de facto president, and prime minister.
- Muwenda Mutebi II of Buganda, 36th Kabaka of the Kingdom of Buganda
- Mwesigwa Rukutana, politician and lawyer

== N ==
- Nabwana I.G.G., filmmaker
- Norbert Mao, Minister of Justice, lawyer and politician
- Nsaba Buturo, politician
- Nalwoga Cerinah Kasirye, businesswoman

== O ==
- Kenneth Odeke, boxer
- Odong Latek, military officer and rebel leader
- Okello Oculi, poet, author and academic
- Okot p'Bitek, poet
- Olara Otunnu, politician, diplomat and lawyer
- Omara Atubo, politician and lawyer
- Omwony Ojwok, politician

== P ==
- Patrick Etolu, high jumper
- Paulo Muwanga, politician
- Peter Lokeris, politician
- Perez Ahabwe, politician and economist
- Perezi Kamunanwire, academic and diplomat
- Phiona Mutesi, chess player
- Pius Bigirimana, civil servant
- Pumla Kisosonkole, politician
- Pyarali Merali, architect
- Pallaso, musician

== Q ==
- Queen Best, Queen Mother of the Tooro Kingdom

== R ==
- Raska Lukwiya, revolutionary
- Richard Nduhura, politician
- Rosemary Byanyima, physician
- Alleluya Rosette Ikote, politician
- Ruhakana Rugunda, former Prime Minister of Uganda
- Rukia Isanga, politician
- Rukia Chekamondo, politician

== S ==
- Salim Saleh, military officer
- Sandra Kwikiriza, digital rights activist
- Seezi Mbaguta, politician and civil servant
- Samuel Kutesa, politician
- Serapio Rukundo, politician
- Shimit Amin, filmmaker
- Simon D'Ujanga, politician
- Simon Ejua, politician
- Simon Lokodo, politician
- Stephen Kiprotich, long-distance runner
- Stephen Mallinga, politician
- Sudhir Ruparelia, businessman
- Sulaiman Madada, politician
- Syda Bbumba, politician
- Theodore Ssekikubo, politician
- Moses Swaibu, footballer

== T ==
- Tarsis Kabwegyere, politician
- Tito Okello, eighth president of Uganda
- Tereza Mbire, entrepreneur

== U ==
- Usama Mukwaya, filmmaker
- Umar Mwidu, physicist

== V ==
- Victoria Nalongo Namusisi, journalist, political administrator and philanthropist

== Y ==
- Yusuf Lule, fourth president of Uganda

== Z ==
- Lillian Zawedde, woodball player

== See also ==
- Lists of people by nationality
- List of governors of Uganda
- List of Ugandan first-class cricketers
- Ugandan university leaders
- List of Makerere University academics
- List of Ugandan actors
- Ugandan Americans
