= Akello =

Akello is a surname. Notable people with the surname include:

- Beatrice Akello Akori (fl. 2020–present), Ugandan politician
- Frances Akello (born 1936), Ugandan farmer, educator and former politician
- Grace Akello (born 1950), Ugandan poet, essayist, folklorist, and politician
- Ibrahim Akello (born 1985), Kenyan former cricketer
- Lucy Akello (born 1980), Ugandan social worker and politician
- Patricia Akello (born 1992), Ugandan professional model
- Rose Lilly Akello (born 1971), Ugandan politician
