= Merali =

Merali is a surname. Notable people with the surname include:

- Naushad Merali (1951–2021), Kenyan businessman
- Pyarali Merali (born 1930), Ugandan architect
- Shaheen Merali (born 1959), Tanzanian writer, curator, critic, and artist

== See also ==
- Morali
