= Muhammadi Lubega Kisambira =

Ugandan Muslim leader

- Born: Luuka, Uganda
- Citizenship: Uganda
- Education: Makerere University; Bachelor of Medicine and Bachelor of Surgery (MBChB) and Master of Public Health (MPH)
- Occupation: Doctor
- Known for: Religion
- Title: National Chairperson of the Uganda Muslim Supreme Council

Muhammadi Lubega Kisambira is a Ugandan medical doctor and religious leader who serves as the National Chairperson of the Uganda Muslim Supreme Council (UMSC).

== Early life and educational background ==
Kisambira was born to the late Hajj Juma Luwangula in Namulanda, in present-day Luuka District. He studied medicine at Makerere University, where he earned both his Bachelor of Medicine and Bachelor of Surgery (MBChB) and his Master of Public Health (MPH). He later completed a PhD in Health Systems and Policy through a joint program between Karolinska University in Stockholm, Sweden, and Makerere University.

== Career ==
Kisambira worked as a researcher and consultant with World Health Organization, the United States National Institutes of Health, and the United Nations Population Fund. He is the founder of the Lubega Institute of Nursing and Medical Sciences, Lubega School of Health Professionals, Lubega School of Vocational Studies and Lugazi Mixed Primary School.

== Leadership roles ==
Kisambira served as the chairman of the Uganda Muslim Supreme Council in Luuka District and led the Muslim Professionals and Entrepreneurs organisation. He is the principal medical officer at Makerere University and patron of Luuka Patriotic Association (LUPA).

Kisambira is the National Chairperson of the Uganda Muslim Supreme Council (UMSC) and serves as the First Deputy Premier of the Busoga Kingdom. In February 2025, he was elected as the Chief Prince of the Baise Igaga clan in the Busoga Kingdom.

== See also ==
- Uganda Muslim Supreme Council
- Muhammad Galabuzi
