= Bataringaya =

Bataringaya is a surname. Notable people with the surname include:

- Basil Kiiza Bataringaya (1927–1972), Ugandan politician
- Edith Mary Bataringaya (1929–1977), Ugandan activist
- Grace Kesande Bataringaya (born 1970), Ugandan politician
- Kamanda Bataringaya, Ugandan physician
