= David Wakikona =

Ugandan aviator and politician

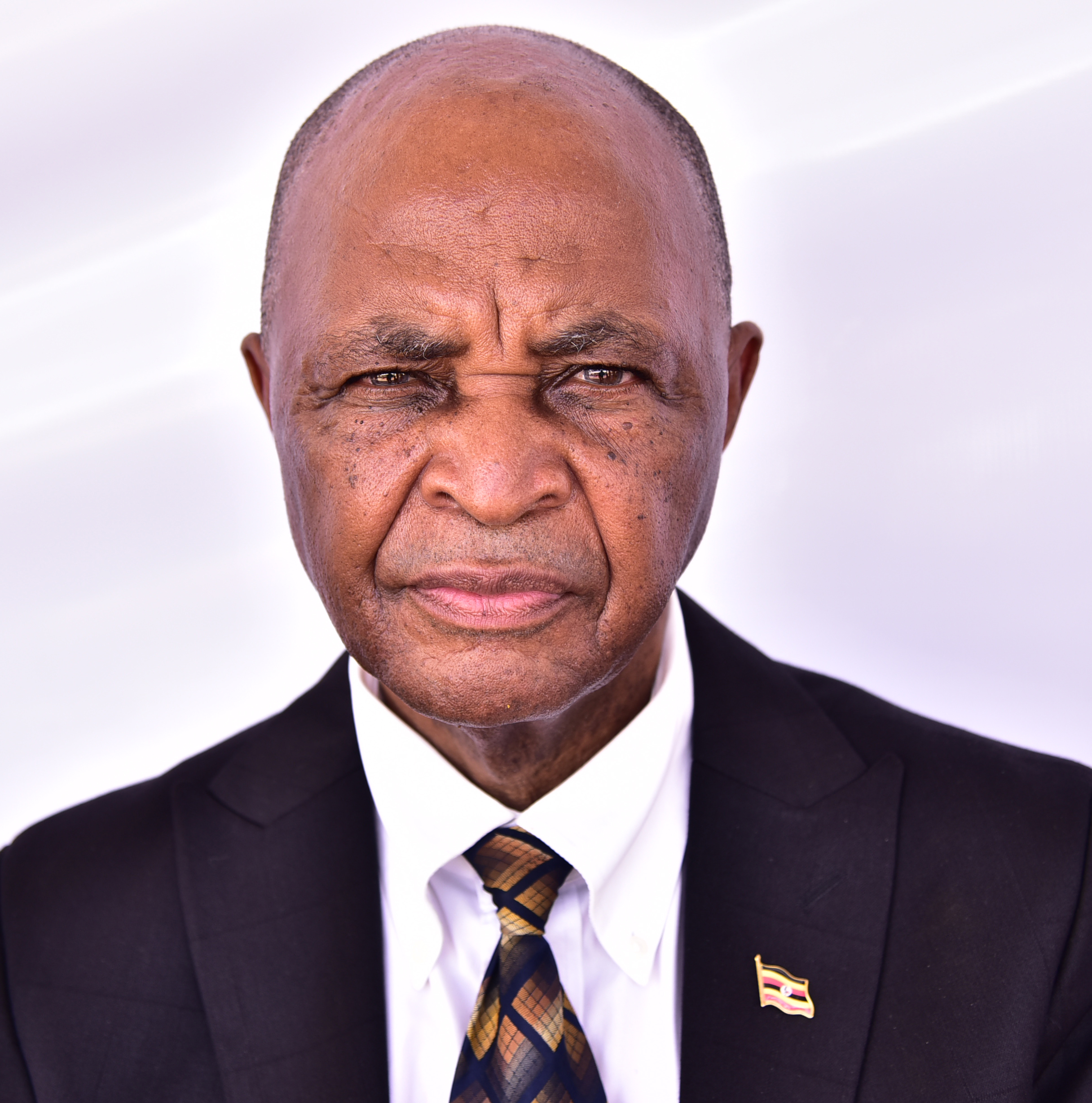
- Born: 26 November 1950 (age 75); Uganda
- Citizenship: Uganda
- Education: East African Civil Aviation Authority ( Commercial Pilot License); CASI in Beirut (Diploma in Flight Operations (Diploma in Government Operations) (Diploma in Aviation Management); University of Western Sydney (Bachelor of Arts in Aviation); Nkumba University (Bachelor of Arts in Public Administration & Management)
- Occupations: Aviator & Politician
- Years active: 1971 — present
- Known for: Politics, Aviation

David Wandendeya Wakikona is a Ugandan aviator and politician, who previously served in the Cabinet of Uganda as State Minister for Northern Uganda (2 June 2006 until 27 May 2011) and State Minister of Trade & Antiquities (May 2011 to June 2016). He was also the elected Member of Parliament representing Manjiya County in Bududa District from 2001 until 2016.

In the run-up to the 2016 general election, Wakikona was defeated by John Baptist Nambeshe in the National Resistance Movement primary for Manjiya County, and consequently he did not contest the election. Following the election, in June 2016 Wakikona was replaced as State Minister for Trade by Michael Werikhe Kafabusa.

He served as the Bushigai County MP in the 11th Parliament (2021–2026) representing Bushigai County, Bududa District, under the National Resistance Movement (NRM) party.

For the 2026–2031 political term, Wakikona did not return to Parliament. He opted out of the 2026 parliamentary race, citing health reasons, and said he intended to retire from elective politics and focus on his farm.

== Early life and education ==
Wakikona was born in Bududa District on 26 November 1950. In 1971, he obtained a commercial pilot license from the East African Civil Aviation Authority, then based at the Soroti Airport. In 1993, he was awarded the Diploma in Flight Operations from CASI in Beirut. The following year, he received the Diploma in Government Operations from the same institution. In 1995, the International Aviation Management Training Institute in Canada, awarded him the Diploma in Aviation Management. In 1999, he received the degree of Bachelor of Arts in Aviation from the University of Western Sydney in Australia. In 2007 he was awarded the degree of Bachelor of Arts in Public Administration & Management by Nkumba University.

== Career ==
From 1991 until 1992, Wakikona served as the Chief Licensing & Flight Inspection Officer for the Civil Aviation Authority of Uganda. From 1993 until 1998, he served as the Director of the East African Civil Aviation Academy, also known as the Soroti Flying School, in Soroti, Eastern Uganda. From 1999 until 2000, he served as the General Manager of Uganda Air Cargo, a government-owned cargo airline. In 2001, he joined politics, contesting the parliamentary seat of Manjiya County in Bududa District. He won, and was re-elected in 2006 and again in 2011. On 1 June 2006, he was appointed State Minister for Northern Uganda in the Office of the Prime Minister, a position he maintained until May 2011. In the cabinet reshuffle of 27 May 2011, he was moved as State Minister to the Trade & Antiquities portfolio. He replaced Gagawala Wambuzi in that role, who was dropped from the Cabinet.

== Personal life ==
Wakikona was widowed in 2017. He belongs to the National Resistance Movement political party. He is reported to have special interest in current affairs and soccer.

== See also ==
- Parliament of Uganda
- Bududa District
- Kwatsi Alibaruho
- Michael Etiang
- Gad Gasatura
- Ali Kiiza
- Naomi Karungi
- Kenneth Kiyemba
- Brian Mushana Kwesiga
- Peter Thomas (pilot)
