= Anas Kaliisa =

Ugandan Islamic scholar, academician and political analyst

Dr. Sheikh Anas Kaliisa
- Born: 1950; Sseke
- Died: November 4, 2020 (aged 69–70); Mulago Hospital
- Citizenship: Ugandan
- Education: Islamic University of Madinah, Makerere University
- Occupations: Islamic scholar, academician, and a senior political analyst
- Years active: till 2020
- Organization: kariisafoundation
- Notable work: Political Analyst
- Relatives: Kin Kariisa, Sheikh Abdunoor Kaduyu, Dr. Sheikh Anas Abdunoor Kaliisa

Dr. Sheikh Anas Kaliisa (1950 – November 4, 2020) was a Ugandan Islamic scholar, academician, and a senior political analyst. He was a personal tutor to president Idi Amin's children. He served as a lecturer and Vice Rector at the Islamic University in Uganda.

== Early life and education ==
He was born in 1950 in Southwestern Uganda to Hajii Abdunoor Kariisa and Hajati Hanifa Kariisa. His early years were spent in Sseke, a town near Masaka, Uganda, where he pursued religious studies. He was enrolled in Kawempe, Kampala, for his secondary education. Upon completion, he was granted a scholarship to attend Madinah University in Saudi Arabia in the late 1960s, where he specialized in Islamic law. He later studied secular law and obtained two advanced degrees including a PhD from Makerere University.

== Career ==
Kaliisa was widely recognized for his contributions to the field of Islamic law and jurisprudence. In addition to his role as a professor at Makerere University and the Islamic University in Uganda, he held positions such as Deputy Mufti and Chief Kadhi of the Uganda Muslim Supreme Council, Director of Religious Affairs, and Vice Rector of the Islamic University in Uganda. Kaliisa served as a representative of Africa at the International Islamic Fiqh Academy, an institution for the advanced study of Islamic jurisprudence and law located in Jeddah, Saudi Arabia. Kaliisa was an advocate for education and made contributions to the establishment of various educational institutions in Uganda. He was a Director at the Institute of Research and Training and served as a Founding Member and Managing Director of the House of Zakat and Waqf in Uganda. He also served as the Chairman of Salam Charity, overseeing the construction of numerous schools and places of worship across Uganda. Kaliisa was a panelist on Uganda’s premier television, NBS Television Uganda, on a top-rated program where he used to dissect key issues around the world and used to run every Sunday evening. He was also the host of several programs on Salam TV, the highest-rated Islamic Television in Uganda.

== Death ==
Kaliisa died from Mulago Hospital on November 4, 2020 and the cause of his death has not been officially confirmed till this date.
