= Muhammad Galabuzi =

Ugandan muslim leader

- Born: 10 October 1962 (age 64); Mukono, Uganda
- Citizenship: Uganda
- Education: Kitezi High School; Bilal Islamic Institute
- Occupation: Teacher
- Known for: Religion
- Title: Supreme mufti

Muhammad Galabuzi (born 10 October 1962), also known as Muhammad Shaban Galabuzi, is a Ugandan Islamic leader who serves as the Supreme Mufti of Uganda.

== Early life and educational background ==
Galabuzi was born on 10 October 1962 in Bunyiri Village, Bukoba, Kyagwe County, Mukono District, Uganda, to Sheikh Shaban Kikomeko and Hajat Nagawa Kikomeko. He attended Entebbe Koran School and Kitezi High School, and later completed advanced theological training at Bilal Islamic Institute.

== Career ==
Galabuzi served as a teacher of Islamic studies at various schools and also founded a Quran school in Kansanga, Kampala to educate Muslim learners.

== Imam ==
Galabuzi served as the imam of Mpererwe Mosque for twenty-seven years and also served as the imam of Kansanga Mosque for seven years.

== Supreme mufti ==
In November 2021, Galabuzi was appointed Supreme Mufti of Uganda, replacing Sheikh Silimaani Kasule Ndirangwa following his resignation.

== See also ==
- Shaban Ramadhan Mubaje
- Nuhu Mbogo Kyabasinga
- Abdullah Ssekimwanyi
- Qamaruzzaman Azmi
- Mirza Ghulam Ahmad
