= Jim Beesigye Owoyesigire =

Ugandan general

Lieutenant General Jim Beesigye Owoyesigire
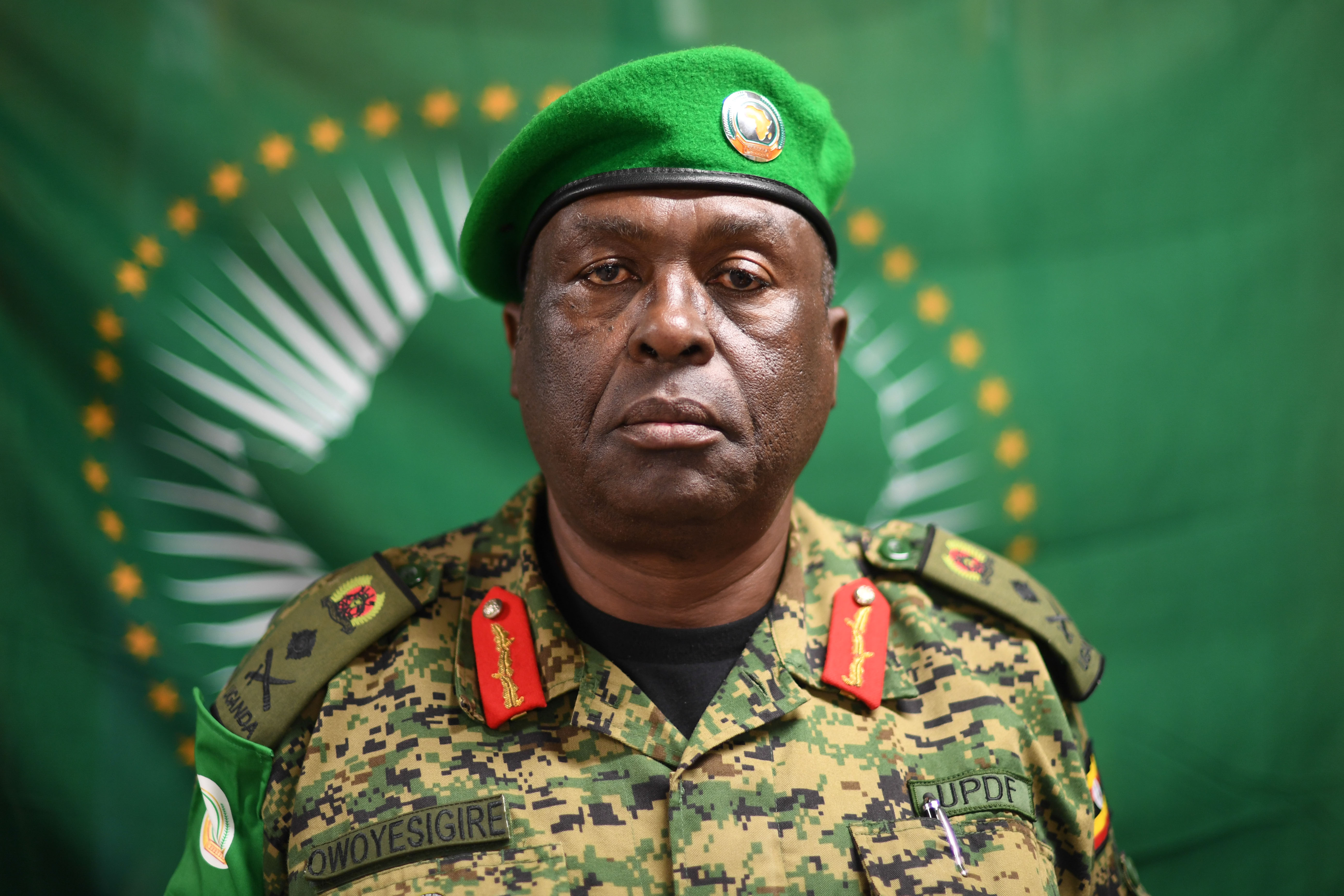
- Born: Uganda
- Citizenship: Uganda
- Education: 'Madras University, India (Masters' Degree) ' (Masters in Defence & Strategic Studies); Islamic University, Uganda (Masters in Religion, Peace & Conflict Resolution)
- Occupation: Military officer
- Years active: 1979–present
- Known for: Military matters
- Title: Commander of AMISOM (February 2018–present)

Jim Beesigye Owoyesigire, was a Lieutenant General in the Uganda People's Defence Forces (UPDF) until his retirement in August 2021. Since February 2018, he was the Commander of the five-nation AMISOM peace keeping force, based in Mogadishu, Somalia. When he assumed that responsibility, he took over from Lieutenant General Osman Noor Soubagleh, of the Djibouti Armed Forces, who had been in office since July 2016. In February 2019, he relinquished command of AMISOM to Lieutenant General Tigabu Yilma Wondimhunegn from the Ethiopian National Defense Force (ENDF). The Amisom command is rotational among countries that contribute troops to the peace-keeping efforts in Somalia, namely Burundi, Djibouti, Ethiopia, Kenya and Uganda.

== Background and education ==
He was born on 11 November 1958 in Kabale District Western Region, of Uganda. He is reported to hold two master's degrees, one a Masters in Defence & Strategic Studies, and the other a Masters in Religion, Peace & Conflict Resolution, from Madras University and Islamic University in Uganda respectively.

== Military career ==
His military service goes back to 1979, when he joined the Ugandan military. Over the years, Owoyesigire has served in various leadership roles including as (a) Commander of the UPDF Air Force from 2005 until 2012, and before that as (b) Division Commander of Field Artillery Division. He has vast knowledge and experience in Field Artillery and Air Defence.

Before his most recent assignment to Somalia, he was chairman of the Steering Committee for the establishment of the National Defence College, Uganda. He also represented the UPDF in the 9th Ugandan Parliament (2011 to 2016).

== See also ==
- Nakibus Lakara
- Ivan Koreta
- Wilson Mbadi
