= Robert Kasule Sebunya =

Ugandan politician

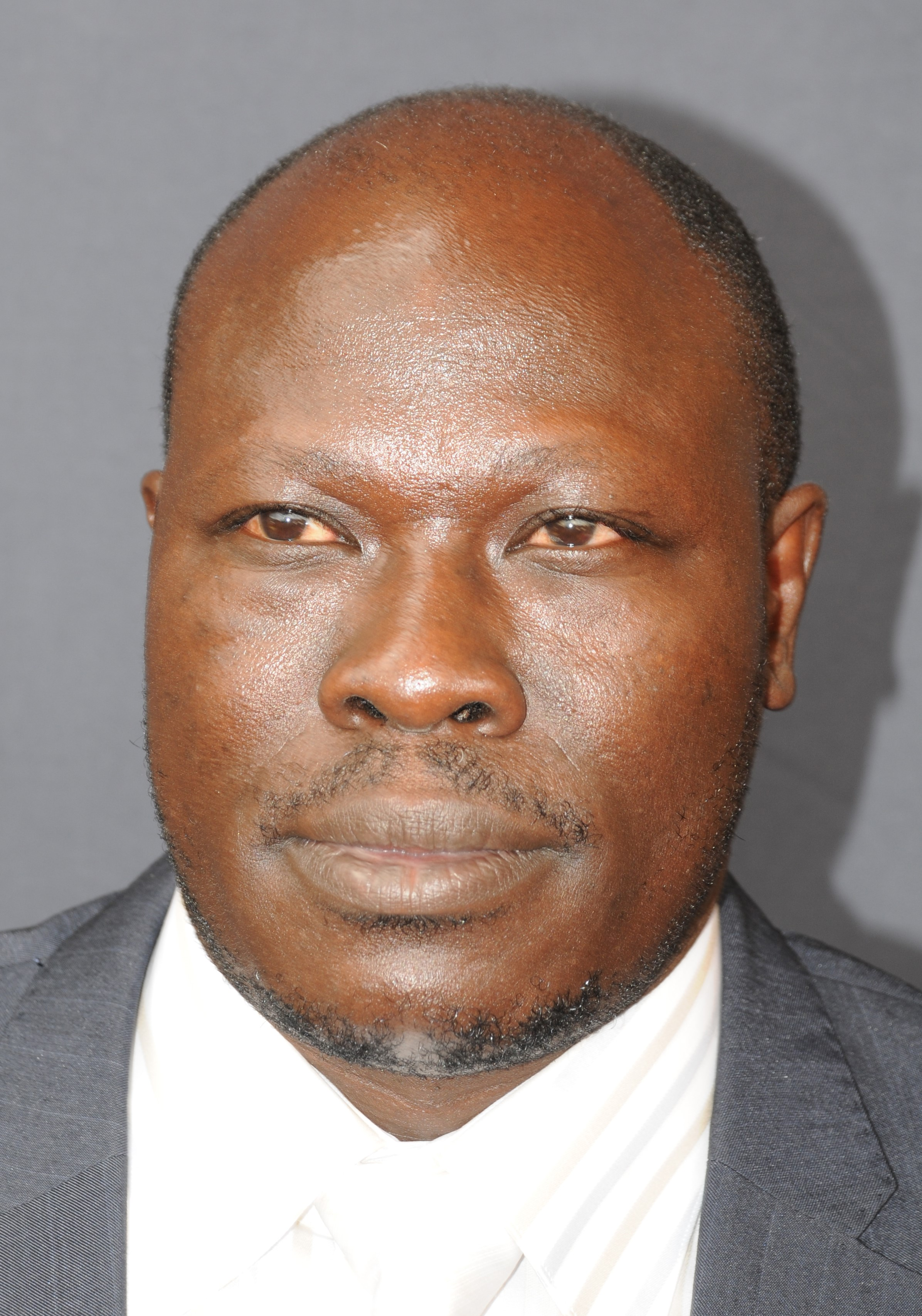
Kasule Robert

Robert Kasule Sebunya is a Ugandan politician who was born on 25 January 1970 to Israel Kibirige Ssebunya. He is a member of the National Reisistance Movement, the ruling party, and the current member of Parliament of Nansana Municipality, Wakiso District.

== Education background ==
Sebunya attended Busoga College Mwiri in the period 1989 to 1991 where attained his Uganda Advanced Certificate of Education. He has a higher diploma in business studies from Nkokonjeru Institute of Management and Technology obtained in 1994. He also graduated with a Bachelor of Business Administration (accounting) from Makerere University in 1998. Sebunya is currently pushing a master's degree in business administration from Eastern and Southern African Management Institute.

== Career ==
Sebunya is a professional member of the International Consortium on Government Financial Management and is also a member of the Parliamentary Network on the World Bank and the International Monetary Fund. in 2015 he was recognised by PROFIRA for outstanding contributions toward the development of the microfinance sector in Uganda.

- 2000–2008: Senior accounts officer, National Water and Sewage Corporation (NWSC).
- 2008–2011: Member of Parliament, Kyadondo County North
- 2011–2016: Member of Parliament, Kyadondo County North
- 2016–Date: Member of Parliament, Nansana Municipality, Wakiso District

Parliamentary committee responsibilities

- 2011–2016: chairperson, Committee on Finance, Planning and Economic Development
- 2017–: chairperson, Committee on Tourism, Trade and Industry.

Committee membership

- Member, Parliamentary Committee on National Economy
- Member, Parliamentary Committee on Commissions, Statuary Authorities and State Enterprises
- Member, Parliamentary Committee on Legal and Parliamentary Affairs.
- Member of the Public Accounts Committee (Central Government).
