= Joseph Mutaka =

Ugandan sports journalist (b. 1986)

Joseph Mutaka is a Ugandan sports journalist.

Mutaka was born 21 November 1986 in the village of Nsuube in Uganda's Jinja District to the late Moses Wanyange and the late Teopista Balyogeraki. His father died when Mutaka was 4 years old, three years later his mother also died.

He went to St Mary’s Primary School – Nsuube and Jinja Parents Day and Boarding primary school for his Primary Education. Mutaka attended LUbani SS and Iganga Progressive Academy for his secondary education. He attended Fairland University.

He began his career with Victoria FM, after which he joined Baba FM and Baba TV. In 2012, Mutaka began working in the Federation of Uganda Football Associations' (FUFA) communications department. There, he travelled with the Uganda national football team for the 2014 African Nations Championship in South Africa.

In 2012 still, Mutaka started Tangosport, a sports events and marketing company that focuses on organising football coaching courses at the FUFA technical centre.

Mutaka was appointed as the head of communications for BUL Jinja FC in the 2012/2013 Uganda Premier League season. He held the position until 2021, when he was appointed as the club's CEO. After his appointment, the club won their first Uganda Cup in the 2021–22 season.

In January 2024, Mutaka graduated with a diploma in football administration and management organised by FUFA.
