= Peter Thomas (pilot) =

British airline pilot

- Born: 1958 (age 67–68); England, United Kingdom
- Citizenship: United Kingdom
- Education: University of Stirling (Bachelor of Science in Biological Sciences); Cranfield University (Master's Degree in Aeronautics; Central Flying School (Professional Pilot License), (Pilot Instructor License) and (Frontline Helicopter License); International Civil Aviation Organization (ICAO Airline Transport Pilots License)
- Occupations: Aviation Consultant and Professional Pilot Instructor
- Known for: Aviation
- Title: Pilot Instructor & Testing Pilot at Uganda Airlines

Peter Thomas, commonly referred to as Pete Thomas, is a British aviation consultant who served as a pilot instructor and testing pilot at Uganda Airlines on the A330-800 equipment, from January 2021 until November 2024.

== Background and education ==
He is a British national by birth circa late 1950s. He holds a Bachelor of Science degree in biological sciences, awarded by the University of Stirling in 1982. He went on to obtain a Master's Degree in Aeronautics from Cranfield University in 1984. In October 1984 he joined the Royal Navy and trained as a Royal Navy Officer of the United Kingdom. He trained at Central Flying School. While there he qualified as pilot for both helicopters and fixed wing aircraft. He also became a flight instructor on fixed wing equipment. He stayed with the Royal Navy until January 1998, a period of over 13 years. Later, he obtained a Commercial pilot licence and an ICAO Airline Transport Pilot Licence.

== Career ==
After he left the Royal Navy in 1998, aged about 40 years, he joined Airtours International Airways, based in Manchester, England. In 2002, the airline rebranded to MyTravel Airways. He worked with them as first officer and line captain, piloting charters to "European and Middle East holiday destinations". He left there in November 2004.

In December 2004 he took up employment with British Mediterranean Airways as a Flight Captain and Crew Resource Management Instructor. In 2007 the airline was acquired by British Midland International. He worked there until March 2010. Then he flew with Flynas of Saudi Arabia continuing with the same tasks, including working as a flight safety investigator.

He was then hired by Etihad Airways, working there for nearly 10 years, as an instructor and examiner on the Airbus A320 and Airbus A330 equipment. He also flew as captain on the Boeing 777 and trained other flight instructors and examiners on the equipment.

He joined Uganda Airlines in January 2021, as a senior captain, training captain and examiner on the new A330-841 equipment that the airline had just acquired. At the time he had over 15,000 flight hours on his record. Of these, more than 11,000 hours were jet hours and over 10,000 hours were Jet Command hours. His ICAO Airline Transport Pilots License is recognized by the Civil Aviation Authority (United Kingdom), the European Union Aviation Safety Agency, the General Civil Aviation Authority of the United Arab Emirates and by the Uganda Civil Aviation Authority. He is type-rated as captain on the following aircraft classes, among others: Airbus A319, Airbus A320, Airbus A321, Airbus A330 and Boeing 777.

Since 2008, he serves as a freelance aviation consultant and commentator on Sky News.

== Retirement ==
After 41 contiguous years of piloting military and civilian aircraft, Thomas captained his last commercial flight on 30 November 2024. He was part of a three-person flight crew together with Captain Kokoro Janda and First Officer Ivan Massa who piloted Flight UR445 from Dubai International Airport to Entebbe International Airport. He was the pilot-in-command.

== See also ==
- Kwatsi Alibaruho
- Michael Etiang
- Gad Gasatura
- Kokoro Janda
- Robert Kateera
- Vanita Kayiwa
- Ali Kiiza
- Naomi Karungi
- Kenneth Kiyemba
- Brian Mushana Kwesiga
- Emmanuel Bwayo Wakhweya
