= Uganda Air Cargo =

Ugandan airline

Coordinates: 00°02′42″N 32°26′35″E

IATA	ICAO	Call sign
—	UCC	UGANDA CARGO
- Founded: 1994; 32 years ago
- Hubs: Entebbe International Airport
- Fleet size: 1
- Destinations: 14
- Parent company: Government of Uganda
- Headquarters: 2nd Floor; Main Airport Terminal; Entebbe International Airport
- Key people: Gad Gasatura (Chairman); Nakibus Lakara(Managing Director)
- Website: www.uganda-aircargo.com

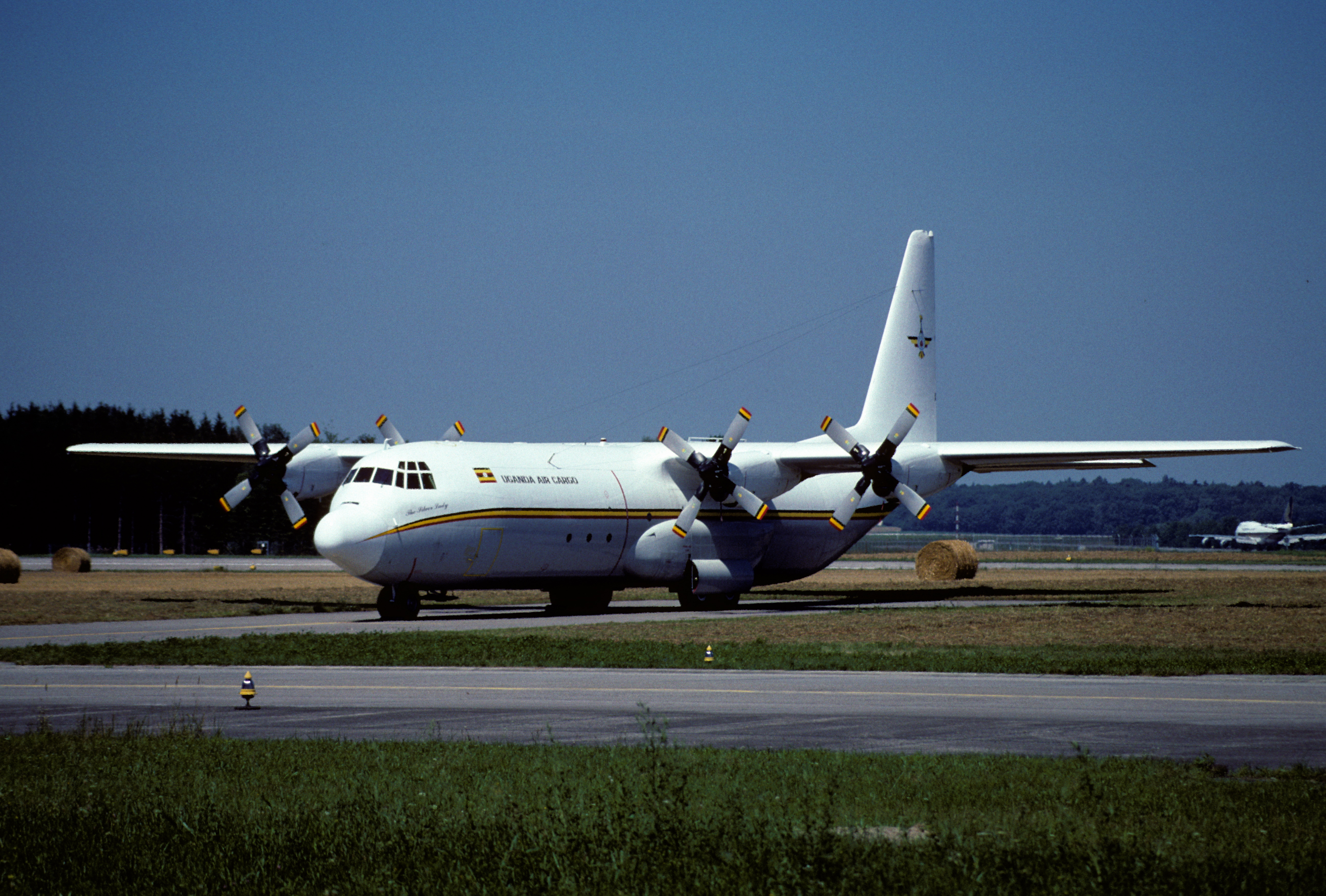
Uganda Air Cargo Lockheed L-382G Hercules

Uganda Air Cargo Corporation (UACC) is a cargo airline based in Kampala, Uganda. It operates scheduled and charter services for both passengers and cargo.

== Location ==
Its main base is located on the 2nd floor of the main airport terminal at Entebbe International Airport. UACC maintains a sales and marketing office on the 3rd Floor, Colline House, Speke Road, in the central business district of Kampala, Uganda's capital and largest city. The coordinates of the main office of UACC are:0°02'42.0"N, 32°26'35.0"E (Latitude:0.0445000; Longitude:32.443056).

== History ==
The airline was established in 1994 by an Act of the Ugandan Parliament, to "provide and operate safe, efficient, adequate, economical and properly coordinated air transport services within and outside the country, for cargo, passenger, chartered passenger flights, air mail services and flight training".

For most of its life, the company has owned one aircraft, a Lockheed C-130 Hercules, registration number 5X-UCF. In October 2009, the fleet was expanded by the addition of two Harbin Y-12 turboprop aircraft. Operations were expanded to include passenger charter services within Uganda and to countries in Eastern, Central and Southern Africa.

== Destinations ==
As of June 2014 Uganda Air Cargo services the following destinations:

- Kenya
  - Nairobi
- Tanzania
  - Kilimanjaro
  - Dar-es-Salaam
- Rwanda
  - Kigali
- Burundi
  - Bujumbura
- DRC
  - Kisangani
  - Goma
  - Bukavu
- Chad
  - Ndjamena
- Mozambique
  - Maputo
- Uganda
  - Entebbe (Main Hub)
  - Arua
  - Gulu
  - Kasese
- Somalia
  - Mogadishu

== Fleet ==
As of June 2024, the fleet of UACC comprised the following aircraft. With financial support from Sheikh Mohammed Bin Maktoum Bin Juma Al Maktoum, a member of the Dubai royal family and Alpha MBM Investments LLC., that he controls, UACC began receiving the cargo planes it sought, beginning with a B737-400F.

Uganda Air Cargo Corporation cargo fleet
Aircraft	In service	Orders	Total	Notes
Lockheed C-130 Hercules Freighter	0	1	1	Cargo
Cessna 350	0	1	1	Charter
Boeing 737-400 Combi	1	0	1	Combi
Boeing 737-800F	0	2	2	Cargo
Airbus A320-200	0	1	1	Charter
Airbus A330-200F	0	1	1	Cargo
Boeing 777F	0	1	1	Cargo
Ilyushin Il-76	0	1	1	Cargo
Total	1	8	9	

== Governance ==
Effective March 2023 Flight Captain Gad Gasatura is the chairman of the 11-person board of directors. Lieutenant General Nakibus Lakara is the general manager and chief executive officer.

== See also ==
- Entebbe International Airport
- Civil Aviation Authority of Uganda
- Uganda Airlines
