= Gertrude Njuba =

Ugandan politician (born 1944)

- Born: Uganda
- Citizenship: Uganda
- Occupation: Politician

Gertrude Njuba is a Ugandan politician who was a key figure in the National Resistance Army (NRA) during the Ugandan Bush War where she held the rank of Captain and was known for her bravery and leadership on the battlefield. She later served in various positions in the National Resistance Movement (NRM) government, including as a member of parliament and presidential advisor. She has received several national medals of honor for her service to Uganda including the Order of the Nile, the Order of the Pearl of Africa, and the Golden Jubilee Medals.

== Early life ==
She was born on 26 November 1944 in Hoima to Bishop Yokana Mukasa and Norah Nakanywa Mukasa. She attended Duhanga Girls' School and Makerere College School. She married Sam Kalega Njuba on 14 September 1964.

== Career ==
In 1981, she joined the NRA bush war and was one of the first women to undergo military training to serve in the liberation struggle. She has served as Chairperson on the Lake Victoria Free Trade Zone Governing council, Presidential advisor on Political Matters and State House director on Land Matters. After the NRA bush war ended, she served as Deputy Minister for Industry in Yoweri Kaguta Museveni's 1986 cabinet.

In September 2016, she was noted to have been vocal in encouraging Ugandans to stream onto streets in Kampala and demonstrate against the 10th Parliament's lavish spending on cars and funerals. She was however against the dropping of piglets within the corridors of the Ugandan parliament by the Jobless Brotherhood youths.

In 2020, Gertrude who was then serving a presidential advisor is alleged to have connived with Ministry of Energy and Mineral Development officials to continue mining in Mubende district, an area where the government evicted illegal miners.
