= Emmy Mercedes Todtmann =

German glacial geologist (1888–1973)

- Born: March 29, 1888; Hamburg, Germany
- Died: May 21, 1973 (aged 85); Hamburg, Germany

Emmy Mercedes Todtmann (1888–1973) was a German glacial geologist whose research included the glaciers of Iceland and Spitzbergen. In Iceland, she conducted research on glacier sliding from the 1940s to the 1970s, which included times when it was unusual for women to conduct such pursuits.

== Biography ==
Emmy Mercedes Todtmann was born on 29 March 1888 in Altona, Germany, to a wine vendor. She became a geology student in Freiburg following World War I and went on to finish her doctorate in 1923. After completing her studies, she worked in government research institutes in geology and soil sciences, which later became part of the State Geological Office in Hamburg, Germany. She also taught geology at the Hamburg Adult Education Center for decades.

=== Glaciologist ===
During the 1930s, Todtmann took two trips to Svalbard, Norway to explore the Ice Age monuments and compare them to the traces of the Ice Age shield, which extended south to northern Germany. Her next targets for research were Iceland's sliding glaciers, which she first visited in the summer of 1931 and continued during the summer of 1934. She explored the borders of Vatnajökull glacier in Iceland, the largest and most voluminous ice cap in Iceland. She stayed at the foot of the glacier to conduct her studies. The outbreak of World War II forced her to pause her research.

The Society of Friends of Iceland was revived in Hamburg in 1950 and Todtmann became head of the group. That same year, she visited the north side of Vatnajökull and conducted research on the glacial outlets of Eyjabakkajökull and Brúarjökull until 1956. The University of Hamburg published many of her results and photographs.

She also took excursions to Algeria and then to Venezuela to study the Pleistocene glaciation traces of the Andean Cordillera at an altitude of 4,000 meters at the age of 70. Still, she returned to Iceland many times to keep measuring glacial morphological events at the edge of the ice. Her 1972 research trip was completed when she was 84, one year before she died.

=== Later years ===
She died in Hamburg, Germany, on 21 May 1973.

== Selected works ==
- Todtmann, Emmy Mercedes. Über das Moränenamphitheater des Gardasees in Oberitalien. Hansischer Gildenverlag Joachim Heitmann et Company, 1950.
- Todtmann, Emmy Mercedes. "Eftirfarandi grein var sótt af Tímarit. is þann 8. desember 2022 klukkan 21: 25." Journal of Glaciology 2, no. 12 (1952): 82-93.
- Todtmann, Emmy Mercedes. Am Rand des Eyjabakkagletschers, Sommer 1953. 1953.
- Todtmann, Emmy Mercedes. Übersicht über die Eisrandlagen in Kringilsárrani von 1890-1955. 1955.
- Todtmann, Emmy Mercedes. Gletscherforschungen auf Island (Vatnajökull). Germany: Cram, de Gruyter, 1960.
