= Michael Nyarwa =

Ugandan general

Brigadier Michael Nyarwa
- Born: Uganda
- Citizenship: Uganda
- Occupation: Military Officer
- Known for: Military Matters
- Title: Commander of UPDF Marine Forces.

Major General Michael Nyarwa, is a Ugandan military officer in the Uganda People's Defence Forces (UPDF). Effective 2009, he is the Commander of UPDF Marine Forces, a specialized formation of the Ugandan military, responsible for the security, safe travel and responsible use of Uganda's waterways, including lakes and rivers.

In addition to security, the Uganda marine unit enforces fishing laws on Ugandan waterways. They also participate in international peace-keeping missions. The UPDF Marine Forces assist in national waterway rescue missions, as well.

== See also ==
- David Muhoozi
- Muhoozi Kainerugaba
- Leopold Kyanda
- Don Nabasa
- Nakibus Lakara
- UG Military Schools

== Succession table ==
Military offices
Preceded by Unknown; As Commander of UPDF Marine Forces	Commander of UPDF Marine Forces; 2018–present	Succeeded by Incumbent; As Commander of UPF Marine Forces
