= Makerere College School =

Location
- Kampala, Central Uganda; Uganda; 00°19′41″N 32°34′04″E

Information
- Type: Public Middle School and High School (grades: 8-13)
- Motto: Be Known By Works And Only Good Works
- Established: 1945; 81 years ago
- Head Teacher: Martin Muyingo
- Enrollment: 2,393 (2019)
- Athletics: soccer, track, tennis, volleyball, basketball and Rugby
- Nickname: Macos
- Website: https://makererecollege.sc.ug

Makerere College School is a co-educational government aided O and A Level school founded in 1945 by Makerere University. In 1945 Makerere University was still a constituent college of the University of London. The school is located on the main campus of Makerere University, adjacent to the College of Education and External Studies on Makerere Hill Road.

== Location ==
The school campus is located within the confines of the main campus of Makerere University, Uganda's oldest university. The school occupies the southwestern corner of the university campus and is bordered by the university's School of Education to the north, the School of Fine Art to the east, Makerere Hill Road to the south, the University Main Sports Grounds to the west, and Mary Stuart Hall to the northwest. This location is approximately 3.5 kilometres (2 mi) northwest of the central business district of Kampala, Uganda's capital and largest city. The coordinates of the main campus of Makerere College School are 0°19'41.0"N, 32°34'04.0"E (Latitude:0.328056; 32.567778).

== Overview ==
The school operates on two campuses: An A’ Level Campus located in Mulawa, Kira Town Council, Wakiso District, approximately 14.5 kilometres (9 mi), north-east of the central business district of Kampala, the capital and largest city of Uganda. The O-Level campus is the main Campus, located on Makerere Hill, Kawempe Division, in the northern environs of Kampala, on land owned by Makerere University.

== History ==
The school started as a demonstration school where innovations in holistic quality teaching could be tried out and the best practices made accessible to other schools and teachers in the country. It started with an enrollment of 32 students; as of July 2019, the student population comprises 1,239 boys and 1,159 girls, for a total of 2,394.

== Reputation ==
Makerere College School is listed among Africa's top 100 schools and shares fame with other traditional schools such as Mengo Senior School, Namilyango College, Gayaza High School, Rainbow International School and Lincoln International to mention a few. Makerere College School has over the years produced some of best candidates in Kampala District in the national O and A level examinations. In 2010, the school was ranked among the ten best middle schools (O Level), based on analysis of S4 results for the ten years from 2000 to 2009. Makerere College School is strong in rugby, behind Namilyango College and St. Mary's College Kisubi. The school is Ranked as the national best college in Literature as of the 2023 UNEB ranking. During 2016, the team represented Uganda at the East African Ball Games and was the second-best in the rugby nationals held in Masindi that year. In 2018, the school was the second in the Central Region of Uganda. In 2019 Makerere College School Rugby Team was the third-best in the continent. The school is renowned for its student leadership program.

== Notable alumni ==
- Mugisha Muntu - Politician and former military officer. Former commander of the Uganda People's Defence Force (1989–1998). Former president of the Forum for Democratic Change political party in Uganda. Member of the East African Legislative Assembly (2006 to 2011). Current President of the Alliance for National Transformation, a Ugandan political party.
- Syda Bbumba - Former minister of gender, labor & social development in Uganda. First woman to serve as minister of finance in the history of Uganda (2009–2011)
- Emmanuel Tumusiime-Mutebile - Economist and banker. Governor of the Bank of Uganda (2001–2022)
- Bebe Cool - A Ugandan recording artist
- Crystal Newman - Ugandan radio and television personality
- Israel Kibirige Ssebunya (1946–2008) - Cytogeneticist, academic, and politician. Served as director of Kawanda Agricultural Research Institute (1992–1996), represented Kyaddondo County North in the Ugandan parliament (1996–2008), and state Minister for Agriculture (1999–2008).
- Stephen Isabalija - Management consultant, accountant, academic, and academic administrator. Vice chancellor of Victoria University Uganda, chairman of the Uganda Electricity Generation Company Limited, and board member of the Uganda Development Bank.
- John Chrysestom Muyingo - Ugandan educator and politician. State minister for primary education in the Ugandan cabinet. Served as state minister for higher education from 27 May 2011 until 1 March 2015.
- Joshua Baraka - Ugandan recording artist and music producer. Baraka gained recognition with his single "Nana" in 2023 and hits like "Wrong Places" which he released in 2025. He has released more than ten albums, including Baby Step, Belinda and Sana.
- Lillian Mary Nabulime - Ugandan sculptor and lecturer

== See also ==
- Education in Uganda
- Ntare School
- King's College Budo
- Jinja College
