= Pumla Kisosonkole =

Ugandan politician

Pumla Ellen Ngozwana Kisosonkole (1911–1997) was a Ugandan politician and activist in women's organizations.

== Biography ==
Pumla Ellen Ngozwana

Pumla Ellen Ngozwana
- Born: South African
- Citizenship: Uganda
- Education: University of Fort Hare
- Spouse: Christopher Kisosonkole in 1939

was born in South Africa in 1911 to Methodist church ministers. She received education at mission schools and attended the University of Fort Hare in Alice, Eastern Cape. She travelled to London, furthering her education at the Institute of Education. She then wrote the pamphlet "Education as I Saw It in England".

She married Ugandan Christopher Kisosonkole in 1939. They moved to Uganda, where Pumla became involved in politics. She spent eight years as a senior community development officer and taught at King's College Budo. In 1956 she was nominated to the Uganda Legislative Council (LEGCO) of the Protectorate Government. She was the first African woman to enter the legislative council. She served as a representative in the legislature during Uganda's transition from a British colony to independence. She started a four-year stretch as president of the Uganda Council of Women in 1957. She was the first African to serve in that role. From 1959 to 1962 she was president of the International Council of Women. Prime Minister Milton Obote appointed her to Uganda's delegation to the United Nations in 1963. In the 1960s she was also a literary expert with UNESCO.

Pumla Kisosonkole died in 1997.
