= Gagawala Wambuzi =

Ugandan politician

Nelson Gagawala Wambuzi

State Minister for Trade and Antiquities
- In office 1 June 2006 – 27 May 2011
- Succeeded by: David Wakinona

Member of Parliament for Bulamogi County, Kaliro District
- In office 1996–2011
- Succeeded by: Kenneth Lubogo

Personal details
- Occupation: Politician

Nelson Gagawala Wambuzi is a Ugandan politician. He was the State Minister for Trade and Antiquities in the Ugandan Cabinet, from 1 June 2006 until 27 May 2011. In the cabinet reshuffle on 27 May 2011, he was dropped from the cabinet and replaced by David Wakinona.

He also served as the elected Member of Parliament (MP), representing "Bulamogi County", Kaliro District, for fifteen (15) consecutive years, from 1996 until 2011. In 2011, he lost his parliamentary seat to Kenneth Lubogo, an Independent politician, who is now the incumbent MP for the constituency. In a space of about ten (10) weeks, Gagawala Wambuzi lost both his parliamentary seat on 18 March 2011 and his ministerial cabinet position on 27 May 2011.

== See also ==
- Cabinet of Uganda
- Parliament of Uganda
