= Godfrey Mugisha =

Ugandan footballer (born 1978)

Mugisha Godfrey (born October 23, 1978) is a former Ugandan footballer who played as a midfielder and supporting striker. Godfrey mostly played as a winger. He represented Uganda on the under-16, under-19, under-21, under-23, and senior national teams, the Cranes. He was meant to play for the under-23 team (all of Africa's games) in South Africa, but he was dropped due to a hamstring injury. He was instrumental in leading KCC F.C. to their first-ever African Champions League semi-final.

He moved to the United States of America in 2000 to attend college and graduated with a degree in information systems and graphic design. He was first-team all-conference in 2002 and 2003, MVP regional XII in 2003, and All-American honorable mention in 2003. During his senior year of 2004/05, he was invited to the Chicago Storm tryouts, a professional indoor soccer team. At the time, he was about to graduate, so he could not be signed.
