= Rosemary Byanyima =

Ugandan physician

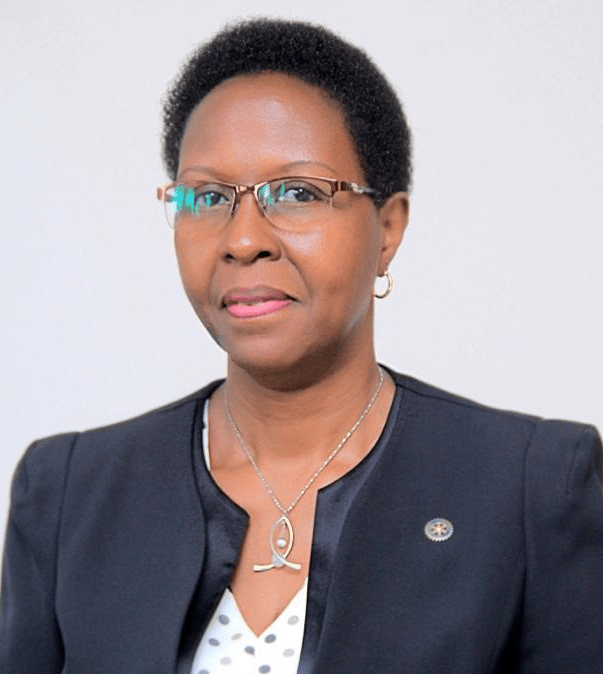
- Dr. Rosemary Byanyima
- Born: Rosemary Kusaba Byanyima; 1965 (age 60–61); Ibanda District, Uganda
- Education: Makerere University (Bachelor of Medicine and Surgery), (Master in Medicine), ESAMI (Executive MBA)
- Occupations: Physician, academic, researcher, administrator and radiologist
- Years active: 1992–present
- Title: Executive director at Mulago National Specialised Hospital
- Spouse: Cleophas Kusaba

Rosemary Kusaba Byanyima is a Ugandan radiologist, physician, academic, researcher and administrator who is the executive director at Mulago National Referral Hospital since April 20, 2024.

== Early life and education ==
Byanyima was born to Joseph Byanyima and Constance Byanyima of Ibanda District.

She completed her O-level education at Immaculate Heart Nyakibale Secondary School and her A-level education at Trinity College Nabbingo. She graduated from Makerere University in 1991 as a Medical Doctor and later earned a Masters Degree in Medicine in the Diagnostic Radiology at Makerere University. She holds an Executive MBA from Eastern and Southern African Management Institute (ESAMI).

== Career ==
Byanyima first worked as a medical officer in the Department of Psychiatry from 1993 to 1995. She has held several leadership positions, including head of the Radiology Department from 2005 to 2011. From 2012 to 2018, she was the clinical head of Diagnostics, supervising four departments: Pathology, Nuclear Medicine, Radiology, and Laboratory. Byanyima chaired the Radiology Department at Makerere University Faculty of Medicine from 2007 to 2008. She holds the role of visiting professor of Radiology at Mbarara University of Science and Technology.

In 2020, she was appointed deputy director of Mulago Hospital, and in March 2022 she was appointed acting executive director. On April 20, 2024, H.E. President Museveni fully appointed her as the executive director. While serving as deputy executive director, Byanyima led efforts to enhance operational efficiency and the quality of patient care at Mulago.

== Boards and committees ==
- Automic Energy Council committee member as a board member (2009–2024)
- Medical Board nember (2024–2022)
- Chair of National Advisory Committee Medical Equipment (2018–2022)
- Uganda Herat Institute (UHI)
- Uganda Cancer Institute (UCI)
- Uganda National Drug Authority (NDA)
- Health Tutors' College (HTC Mulago)
- Uganda Institute of Allied Health and Management Sciences (UIAHMS)

== Research ==
Byanyima has published findings on radiology, diagnosis and treatment, and biomechanics in medical journals and other peer publications.

== Personal life ==
Byanyima married the late Cleophas Kusaba on 30 September 1989. They have two children.
