= Alleluya Rosette Ikote =

Ugandan legislator, former Member of Parliament

Alleluya Rosette Ikote Honourable

Woman Member of Parliament, Pallisa District 1996–2001
- Succeeded by: Jenipher Namuyangu

National Resistance Council member 1989–1996

Personal details
- Party: National Resistance Movement (NRM)
- Occupation: Politician

Alleluya Rosette Ikote is a Ugandan politician and former Member of Parliament. She was the Woman Representative for Pallisa District in the National Resistance Council (1989–1996) and a Member of Parliament (1997–2001) for the same constituency in Uganda's sixth parliament.

== Career ==
=== Politics ===
Ikote contested in the 1989 Ugandan general election and was the Woman Representative for Pallisa District on the 1989 National Resistance Council (NRC). Later on, affiliated to the National Resistance Movement (NRM), she contested in the 1996 Ugandan parliamentary election and represented the same constituency in Uganda's sixth parliament (1997–2001)

She was replaced by Jennifer Namuyangu who defeated her in the 2001 Ugandan parliamentary elections.

=== Post-politics ===
Ikote worked in Nairobi as the Executive Director of Amani Forum.

She was later appointed the Governance Programme Manager of the United Nations Development Programme (UNDP) in South Sudan.

== See also ==
- Parliament of Uganda
- Jenipher Namuyangu
