= Silver Kayemba =

- Born: Uganda
- Citizenship: Uganda
- Occupation: Military Officer
- Years active: 1986 – present
- Known for: Military Matters

Major General Silver Kayemba is a senior military officer in the Uganda People's Defense Force (UPDF). He currently serves as the Military Attaché at Uganda's Permanent Mission to the United Nations in New York City.

== Background and education ==
He was born in the Central Region of Uganda.

== Career ==
In 2010, at the rank of brigadier, he served as the chief of training and operations for the UPDF. From May 2011, until August 2012, at the rank of brigadier, he served as the chief of staff of the UPDF Land Forces. In September 2012, he was promoted to major general and was posted to the United Nations headquarters in New York City.

== See also ==
- Henry Tumukunde
- Salim Saleh
- Elly Tumwine
- Katumba Wamala
- List of military schools in Uganda
