= Godliver Businge =

Ugandan civil engineer

Godliver Businge (born c. 1987) is a Ugandan civil engineer and head technology trainer for Global Women's Water Initiative.

Growing up, Businge recalls often carrying a 20-liter jerrycan on her head. Following her graduation from high school and the death of her sister and father, Businge enrolled at African Rural University. Realising she wanted to become an engineer, she transferred to the Uganda Rural Development Training Vocational Institute. She chose construction as her major, learning brick laying and concrete, mechanical engineering, carpentry, joinery, metal work and fabrication. She earned a scholarship from URDT, worked part-time in the metal workshop, and won a home design competition in 2009 for Uganda Vision 2035. She graduated from the program then attended St Joseph's Technical Institute in Kisubi, Uganda. In 2011 she set up two pico hydroelectric power stations in Kagadi. She earned a civil engineering degree in 2012, graduating at the top of her class and giving the commencement speech. Following her graduation she declined a job offer from the Ugandan Minister of Education, citing her intention to further her education.

Businge works as the head technology trainer for Global Women's Water Initiative (GWWI), teaching women and youth in Kenya, Tanzania, and Uganda how to build water access and conservation technology. She teaches the construction of bio-sand filters and water tanks. Through the organisation, Businge has taught women construction who were later contracted to build ventilated improved pit latrines.

Businge has a daughter and hosted the radio show Ladies Night, raising awareness of the importance of educating young women.
