= Ibrahim Akello =

Kenyan cricketer

Personal information
- Full name: Constatine Ibrahim Akello
- Born: 31 March 1985 (age 41); Nairobi, Kenya
- Batting: Right-handed
- Bowling: Right-arm medium-fast

Career statistics
Competition	Twenty20
Matches	4
Runs scored	1
Batting average	–
100s/50s	–/–
Top score	1*
Balls bowled	66
Wickets	1
Bowling average	90.00
5 wickets in innings	–
10 wickets in match	–
Best bowling	1/20
Catches/stumpings	–/–
- Source: Cricinfo, 22 September 2021

Constatine Ibrahim Akello (born 31 March 1985) is a Kenyan former cricketer.

Akello was born at Nairobi in March 1985. In November 2011, he toured Namibia with Kenya and played in four Twenty20 matches against the Namibia national cricket team at Windhoek, taking a single wicket from 11 overs bowled across the four matches with his right-arm medium-fast bowling. He had previously toured the Netherlands in September 2011 for their first-class and One Day International series, part of the ICC Intercontinental Cup, with the first-class fixture being abandoned and Akello not featuring in the one-day series.
