= Emmy Okello =

Ugandan cardiologist

- Born: 1977 (age 48–49); Uganda
- Citizenship: Uganda
- Education: Mbarara University (Bachelor of Medicine and Bachelor of Surgery); Wuhan University (Master of Medicine in Internal Medicine); Makerere University (Doctor of Philosophy); Case Western Reserve University (Interventional Cardiology Fellowship); American College of Cardiology (Fellow of the American College of Cardiology)
- Occupations: Consultant cardiologist and academic
- Years active: 2000–present
- Title: Head of Cardiac Catheterization Department at Uganda Heart Institute

Emmy Okello is a Ugandan consultant physician who has specialized as an interventional cardiologist and researcher. He serves as the Head of the Cardiac Catheterization Department at Uganda Heart Institute, the government institution in Kampala that specializes in the treatment of congenital and acquired cardiac disorders.

Okello has special interest in rheumatic heart disease (RHD), and is one of the recognized leaders in this area of cardiology in the region.

== Background and education ==
Okello was admitted to Mbarara University School of Medicine in the 1990s, graduating with a Bachelor of Medicine and Bachelor of Surgery degree. He continued his studies at Wuhan University, in Wuhan, Hubei, China, graduating with a Master of Medicine degree in Internal Medicine. In 2015, he graduated with a Doctor of Philosophy degree from Makerere University, Uganda's oldest and largest public university. He then underwent a one-year fellowship in Interventional Cardiology at Case Western Reserve University, in Cleveland, Ohio, United States. His doctoral thesis was titled "Burden, Risk Factors And Outcome of Rheumatic Heart Disease in Uganda".

His research has identified the high morbidity and mortality, along with the big burden that RHD presents. He also found genetic susceptibility to RHD related to the major histocompatibility complex (MHC) class II Human Leucocyte Antigens (HLA) DR–11.

== Career ==
Okello joined the Uganda Heart Centre in 2010. In a 2019 interview, he stated that he qualified as a cardiologist in 2013.

He has mastered the technique known as "percutaneous mitral commissurotomy", performed on patients with severe mitral stenosis. Commissurotomy is heart surgery that repairs one of the four internal heart valves (this time the mitral valve) that is narrowed from mitral valve stenosis, as a result of fibrosis, often from rheumatic heart disease. "Percutaneous" means that instead of opening up the patient's chest to carry out the procedure in the open, it is done through a small incision in the upper arm. The procedure is performed remotely while watching on a fluoroscopic screen.

== Awards and recognition ==
In April 2019, Okello was elected as a Fellow of the American College of Cardiology by the American College of Cardiology, based in Washington, DC, in recognition of his body of work.
