= Crystal Newman =

- Born: Angela Newman; Nairobi
- Education: Makerere University (Bachelor of Science in mass communications)
- Occupations: Radio presenter (2000 - 2018); Television host
- Spouse: Fred Kavulu (m. 2005)

Crystal Newman (born Angela Newman in Nairobi) is a Ugandan radio and television presenter. Newman presented The Drive and Hit Selector shows at 88.2 Sanyu FM, located in Kampala, Uganda.

== Career ==
Newman retired from radio presenting after 18 years in August 2018. She was considered one of the most recognisable voices in Uganda.

In August–September 2018, Newman was host of the Uganda Festival 2018 in Washington DC.

Newman hosted the first and second season's of reality television show NSSF Friends with Benefits alongside Gaetano Kagwa in 2015 and 2017.

== Person life ==
Newman's parents were Sande Newman, a Ugandan Aircraft pilot and Alex Newman, a former United Nations High Commissioner for Refugees worker. She was one of four girls in the family.

Newman graduated with Bachelor of Science in mass communications at Makerere University.
