= John-Mary Kauzya =

Ugandan diplomat (born 1957)

John-Mary Kauzya (born 1957) is a Ugandan diplomat known for his research and policy advice in the areas of governance and public administration.

Kauzya is the former (retired in 2022) Chief of the Public Service Innovation Branch of the Division for Public Institutions and Digital Government at the United Nations Department of Economic and Social Affairs.
