= Israel Kibirige Ssebunya =

Ugandan politician

Israel Kibirige Ssebunnya
- Born: 1 January 1946; Mukono District, Uganda
- Died: 7 October 2008 (aged 62)
- Citizenship: Uganda
- Education: Bachelor of Science in Agriculture (BSc); Makerere University, Kampala, Uganda; Master of Science in Agriculture (MSc); University of Saskatchewan, Canada; Doctor of Philosophy in Cytogenetics (PhD); University of Saskatchewan, Canada
- Occupations: Research scientist, politician
- Years active: 1970 – present
- Known for: Politics, Agricultural Research

Israel Kibirige Ssebunya (1 May 1946 – 8 October 2008) was a Ugandan cytogeneticist, agricultural researcher, academic and politician. He served as the State Minister for Agriculture, Animal Industry & Fisheries, from 1999 to 2008. Prior to that, he served as director of research at Kawanda Agricultural Research Institute (KARI). He was also the elected Member of Parliament (MP), representing Kyadondo County North in Wakiso District. He served in that capacity continuously from 1996 until his death in 2008.

== Early life and education ==
Israel Kibirige Ssebunya was born in Mukono District, on 1 May 1946, the fifth child of Besweri Kibirige. His paternal grandfather was Ssewaali Kisajjaki of the Ngeye Clan, of Katente, Kyaggwe County, in modern-day Mukono District.

He attended primary school in Matugga, Wakiso District. He went on to attend Ndejje Secondary School for his "O" Level Junior (S1 -S4). He then transferred to Makerere College School for his "A" Level education (S5 -S6). From 1967 until 1971, Kibirige attended Makerere University, graduating with the degree of Bachelor of Science in Agriculture (BSc). He majored in plant breeding.

He obtained his Master of Science in Agriculture (MSc) degree from the University of Saskatchewan in Canada. He specialised in cytogenetics and plant breeding. He continued with further studies in those two specialised areas of agriculture by obtaining the degree of Doctor of Philosophy (PhD) degree from the same university.

Kibirige Ssebunya later acquired other postgraduate qualifications including:

- Certificate in Farming Systems – From the University of Florida, Gainesville, Florida, US.
- Certificate in Agricultural Research Extension Technologies – From Ohio State University, Columbus, Ohio, US.
- Certificate in Senior Management Programmes in Administration – Regent College, Regent, United Kingdom
- Certificate in Agriculture Extension Management – From an institution in India

== Scientific work ==
From 1970 until 1974, and again from 1980 until 1984, Kibirige Ssebunya worked as a Botanist, specialising in plant breeding at the Coffee Research Unit at Kawanda Agricultural Research Station, in North Kyaddondo County, in modern-day Wakiso District. Between 1980 and 1986, he served as an Adjunct Lecturer in plant genetics and plant breeding, in the Department of Crop Science, Faculty of Agriculture, Makerere University, Kampala, Uganda.

While pursuing his graduate studies in Canada from 1974 until 1980, he carried out intensive cytogenetics studies, including breeding and transfer of alien germplasm among the bread wheats and their wild relatives as well as disease studies among multi-lines of wheat species.

From 1984 until 1989, he served as the Principal Research Scientist, Coffee Research Program, Kawanda Agricultural Research Institute (KARI). From 1989 until 1992, he served as the Acting Director of Research at Namulonge Agricultural Research Institute. During the same time-frame he also served as the acting director of research at KARI.

== Political career ==
Having served as State Minister for Agriculture since 1999, Kibirige Ssebunya was nominated by President Yoweri Museveni to Parliament, in May 2006, to be vetted for re-appointment to cabinet. He was re-appointed State Minister for Agriculture on 1 June 2006.

== Death ==
Kibirige Ssebunya died cancer of the throat, at Mulago National Referral Hospital, in Kampala, on 8 October 2008. After lying "In State" in the lobby of the Parliament Building, his body was buried at his ancestral home in Katente Village, Mukono District. The mourners included President Yoweri Museveni, Janet Museveni, Uganda Cabinet Ministers and other national leaders.

Kibirige was survived by his wife, Theresa Namatovu Ssebunya, a lecturer in biological sciences at the University of Botswana in Gaborone, Botswana, and five children (three girls and two boys). One of his sons, Robert Sebunya Kasule, was elected to replace his father as MP for Kyadondo County North. He was re-elected in 2011, he was re-elected in 2016 as the member of parliament for Nansana municipality.
