= Kenneth Odeke =

Ugandan boxer

Personal information
- Nickname: Bad News
- Nationality: Ugandan
- Born: November 13, 1990 (age 35) Uganda
- Height: 1.91 m (6 ft 3 in)
- Weight: Heavyweight

Boxing career
- Stance: Orthodox

Boxing record
- Total fights: 7
- Wins: 6
- Win by KO: 83.33%
- Losses: 1
- Draws: 0
- No contests: 1

Kenneth Odeke (born November 13, 1990) also known as "Bad News," is a Ugandan professional boxer in the heavyweight division. Odeke began his professional career on July 6, 2012. Known for his orthodox fighting style, he gained recognition in the boxing world for his powerful knockouts and imposing physique.

== Early career and notable fights ==
Odeke made his professional debut against James Omollo, securing a win by knockout in the first round. His early career featured a string of victories, achieving knockouts against Joseph Ayeko and Suleiman Ashraf from Tanzania. Standing at 6 feet 6 inches with a considerable reach, he leveraged these physical attributes to his advantage in his initial matches.

== Challenges and setbacks ==
One of Odeke's challenges arose from a fight against Iranian boxer Sayed Abbas Nassab. Originally scheduled for June, the fight was postponed to accommodate Nassab’s request during the Ramadan period and eventually took place at the Kati Kati restaurant. In this match, Odeke suffered his first professional defeat, losing by technical knockout. He endured a tough fight, bleeding profusely from Nassab's powerful jabs. Despite the setback, Odeke expressed a desire for a rematch and showed a determined resolve to continue improving his boxing skills. In 2014, he won the fight against AJ Carter when he knocked him out in the third of the four rounds at York Hall.

== Career development ==
After the defeat, Odeke worked on enhancing his technique and physical fitness. His promoter and trainers focused on better preparation for future fights, emphasizing the need for more rigorous training to match the standards of top international boxers. This phase of his career was crucial for his development, showing promise for future competitions.

== Professional record ==
6 Wins (83.33% by knockouts, 1 Loss, 0 Draws, 1 Contest
Result	Record	Opponent	Date	Result	Location
Win	5-41-4	(Uganda) Moses Matovu	June 6, 2014	W-PTS	(United Kingdom) Holiday Inn, Ormeau Avenue, Belfast, UK
Win	6–0–0	(United Kingdom) AJ Carter	May 17, 2014	W-KO	(United Kingdom) York Hall, Bethnal Green, UK
Win	3–0–1	(Uganda) Hudson Muhumuza	February 28, 2014	W-TKO	MTN Arena Lugogo, Kampala, Uganda
Loss	debut	(Iran) Sayed Abbas Nasab	August 9, 2013	L-TKO	(Uganda) Kati Kati Gardens, Kampala
Win	3–0–1	(Tanzania) Ashraf Suleiman	February 15, 2013	W-TKO	MTN Arena Lugogo, Kampala, Uganda
Win	3–0–1	(Uganda) Joseph Ayieko	November 30, 2012	W-TKO	MTN Arena Lugogo, Kampala, Uganda
Win	3–0–1	(Uganda) James Ololo	July 6, 2012	W-KO	MTN Garden City Roof Top, Kampala, Uganda

== See also ==
- Sharif Bogere
- Mohamed Muruli
- Kassim Ouma
- Leo Rwabogo
- Hassan Saku
- Cornelius Boza Edwards
