= Margaret Illukol =

Ugandan-Australian nurse

Margaret Rose Illukol
- Born: 1954(?); Karimojong, Uganda
- Died: 15 February 2015; Newcastle, Australia
- Occupation: Registered Nurse

Margaret Rose Illukol (1954(?) – 2015) was a nurse known for surviving a disfiguring hyena attack as a girl in Uganda. After being brought to Australia for medical treatment, she wrote a book about her experiences. Her bequest was used to start a scholarship fund.

== Biography ==
=== Early life in Africa ===
Born in Karamoja, Uganda, Margaret Illukol was attacked by a hyena in 1963, when she was eight years old. She was carried 160 km by her tribe to the nearest hospital. Maggots infected the wound, helping with the initial healing process. Surgeries followed at the Mulago Hospital in Kampala, where her education and Christian baptism took place.

=== Immigration to Newcastle, Australia ===
It was recognised that further reconstructive surgeries could not be carried out in Kampala, leading to Dr Arnold Biase, her surgery coordinator, asking for support through the Rotary International Magazine. Margaret, with the aid of the International Rotary Club, ended up in Newcastle, NSW, Australia in 1975.

=== Education and career ===
Margaret received encouragement and support from the Mulago hospital staff to complete her primary and secondary school education with the Rotary Club of Kampala paying for her education. She completed her High School Certificate at St Joseph's College, Lochinvar in 1978. In 1983, she graduated from a nursing program at Gosford Hospital. She started her career as a registered nurse in the orthopedics department at the Royal Newcastle Hospital in 1984, where she had previously stayed as a patient many times.

Margaret was also an author. In 1990, she published a memoir of her ordeals, Child of the Karimojong. She was inspired by the book 'Joni' by Joni Eareckson, which she read during one of her operations at the Royal Newcastle Hospital.

In 1996 Margaret graduated from the University of Newcastle with a Bachelor of Nursing. This same year she also became an Australian citizen. Margaret continued her nursing career and in 2006 she moved from the Royal Newcastle Hospital to John Hunter Hospital, where she continued working in the orthopedics department until her death in 2015.

=== Death and afterward ===
Margaret died 15 Feb 2015, after an accident at her home. According to Margaret's friends, she was self-conscious about her appearance after having 75 facial operations and never married. Having no family, she left her entire estate to the Rotary International District 9670. Rotary used her bequest to establish the Margaret Illukol Health Scholarships at the University of Newcastle for health students.

== Published works ==
1990: Child of the Karimojong. South Melbourne: Macmillan
