= Fairland University =

Private university in Uganda

- Type: Private
- Established: 2001
- Administrative staff: 28 (academic)
- Students: 1000+ (2009)
- Location: Jinja, Uganda; 00°26′24″N 33°14′15″E
- Campus: Urban
- Website: www.fairvarsity.ac.ug

Fairland University (FLU) is a private university in Uganda.

== Location ==
The campus of Fairland University is located at 30/34 Eden Road, Walukuba Masese Zone, within the city of Jinja, Uganda's second largest commercial center, approximately 80 kilometres (50 mi), by road, east of Kampala, the capital of Uganda. The coordinates of the university campus are:0° 26' 24.00"N, 33° 14' 15.00"E (Latitude:0.440000; Longitude:33.237500)...

== History ==
The university is privately owned by a corporation known as Fairland University Limited. At first housed in a congested residential neighborhood, the university has since shifted to more spacious premises. It has received accreditation from the Uganda National Council for Higher Education, and is ranked among the leading educational institutions in the state of Uganda. The university is non-residential, with students finding accommodation in independent students' hostels, located close to the university campus authority.

== Courses ==
As of October 2009, the academic courses offered at Fairland University included:

- Bachelor of Arts in Economics (BA.Econ)
- Bachelor of Arts in Business Management (BA.Bus.Mgt)
- Bachelor of Arts in Education (BA.Ed)
- Bachelor of Business Administration (BBA)
- Bachelor of Science with Education (BSc/Ed)
- Bachelor of Science in Mass Communication (BSc.MComm)
- Bachelor of Development Studies (BDS)
- Bachelor of Arts in Guidance & Counseling (BA.G&C)
- Bachelor of Information Technology (BIT)
- Bachelor of Science in Nursing (BSN)
- Bachelor of Arts in Religious Studies (BA.Rel.Std)

In addition to the undergraduate courses, instruction at Certificate and Diploma levels are available in the above disciplines. A limited number of Postgraduate courses are offered at the university.

== See also ==
- Jinja
- Jinja District
- Education in Uganda
- List of universities in Uganda
- List of Business Schools in Uganda
- Ugandan university leaders
