= Christine Kitumba =

Ugandan Supreme Court justice

- Born: Uganda
- Education: Dar es Salaam (Bachelor of Laws); The Queen's University of Belfast (Master of Laws)
- Occupations: Lawyer, judge

Christine Nakaseeta Binayisa Kitumba is a Ugandan lawyer and judge. She served as a Justice of the Supreme Court of Uganda, from July 2009. Her tenure was expected to conclude in 2015. In July 2017, she was requested to continue serving, in order to alleviate a shortage of justices on the country's highest court. As of September 2017, she served on the court on an extended contract. Before her appointment on the Supreme Court, she was a member of the Court of Appeal of Uganda.

== Background and education ==
She was born in the Buganda Region of Uganda. After attending primary school locally, she was admitted to Trinity College Nabbingo, where she finished with a High School Diploma. She has a Bachelor of Laws obtained from Dar es Salaam University, Tanzania a public university that was established in 1961. Has a Master of Laws, obtained from The Queen's University Belfast in 1969.

== On the Supreme Court of Uganda ==
In August 2015, Justice Christine Kitumba was part of the 6–1 majority which held that it was unconstitutional for the family of the man to demand a refund of the bride price, from the family of the woman, in case of a divorce. However the demand of bride price before a traditional marriage was ruled constitutional.

== See also ==
- Judiciary of Uganda
