= Shaban Ramadhan Mubaje =

Sheikh Shaban Ramadhan Mubaje is the Grand Mufti of Uganda under the Uganda Muslim Supreme Council , a position he has occupied since 2000. Mubaje was born in 1955 in Bungokho, Mbale District, Uganda.

He was elected the Grand Mufti on December 11, 2000, with a focus on unity and development within the Muslim community.

== Early life and education ==
Mubaje was born to the late Hajji Ramadhan Mubaje and Hajjat Hadijah Naake. He began his education at Buyobo Primary School and continued his Islamic theological studies at Kyampisi Muslim School for O-level and Bugembe Islamic Institute in Jinja for A-level in 1976 in Islamic studies.

In 1977, he went to Riyadh in Saudi Arabia for a bachelor's degree in Sharia(Islamic Law). He furthered his academic journey by obtaining a postgraduate diploma in philosophy from the Islamic University in Uganda, Mbale. He later pursued a master's degree in religious studies at Makerere University and subsequently lectured in religious studies at the Islamic University in Uganda

== Career ==
Before he was elected Grand Mufti, Mubaje served as the Khadi of Mbale District, where he gained recognition for his leadership and efforts in community development. On December 11, 2000, he was elected as the Grand Mufti of Uganda, a position he has since held, advocating for unity among Ugandan Muslims and fostering national and international collaboration. In 2015, he became a member of the Supreme Council of Muslim Leaders, a global assembly of Muslim scholars.

As the Grand Mufti, Mubaje has been actively involved in interfaith initiatives and was instrumental in the formation of the Inter-Religious Council of Uganda (IRCU) and the Religions for Peace - African Council of Religious Leaders. These organizations have played a key role in promoting religious harmony and addressing socio-economic issues affecting Ugandans.

== Leadership and contributions ==
During his tenure, Mubaje has overseen various initiatives aimed at improving the welfare of the Muslim community in Uganda. He has championed the establishment of educational institutions, supported economic empowerment programs, and encouraged youth involvement in developmental activities. In 1982, he became the Imam of Madinah Mosque, Mbale, and founded the Mahdi Noor Islamic Institute. In 2001, he helped form the Religions for Peace - African Council of Religious Leaders, where he has facilitated the involvement of Muslim communities in Pan-African development initiatives. He continues to hold the position of Co-Chair of the Council.

He has also been a vocal advocate for peace and reconciliation, often calling for dialogue among different religious and political groups. His leadership has seen efforts to modernize the UMSC, improve governance structures, and promote the recognition of Islamic institutions within the Ugandan legal framework.

On 25th September 2026, His Eminence Dr Shaban Ramadhan Mubajje visited people of Kotido where he donated foot to 1000 households as hunger continues following prolonged drought and crop failure in karamoja region. Shiekh Obilan Abubakar, the regional Assistant to the Mufti for Teso-Karamoja region thanked the Mufti for what he described as proactive support to the people of Karamoja. He said the Mufti had demonstrated building livelihood and support to communities beyond religious matters. Mufti Mubajje pledged more according to his statement that "Islam is for Humanity. We came with something small," but i will mobilize more, Mufti said. The beneficiaries were drawn from Napupum and Kamor sub-counties. Each household received a food package containing five kilograms of posho, rice, salt, cooking oil, silver fish, beans and sugar.

== Controversies ==
Mubaje’s tenure has not been without challenges. He has faced opposition from factions within the Muslim community, including allegations related to financial mismanagement, land disputes, and overstaying in office within the Uganda Muslim Supreme Council. In 2008, he was at the center of a legal dispute but was later acquitted. Despite these controversies, he has remained a key figure in Uganda's religious leadership.

In December 2023, an attempt was made by some members of the Uganda Muslim Supreme Council to suspend him from office, citing governance concerns. However, he maintained his position as Grand Mufti, and the matter remains a point of contention within the council.

== See also ==
Uganda Muslim Supreme Council

Grand muftis
