= Uganda Muslim Supreme Council =

Islamic organization in Uganda

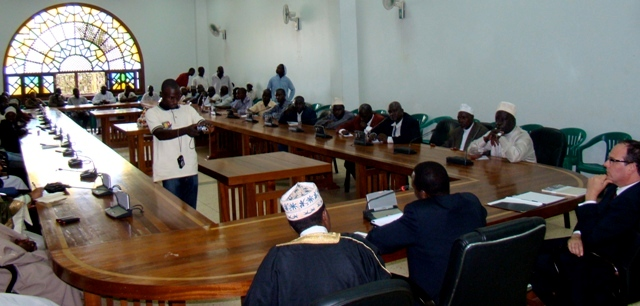
- UMSC leaders engaged in debate
- Abbreviation: UMSC
- Formation: 1 June 1972; 53 years ago
- Headquarters: Plot No. 23-25, Old Kampala Hill
- Location: Uganda
- Mufti of Uganda: Shaban Ramadhan Mubaje
- Deputy Mufti of Uganda: Muhammad Ali Waiswa
- Website: http://umsc.or.ug/

The Uganda Muslim Supreme Council (UMSC) is the chief organization for governing and representing Islam in Uganda. The UMSC was founded in 1972 to bring together the divided Muslim community in Uganda. It is currently led by Sheikh Shaban Mubaje, who serves as the Grand Mufti of Uganda.

== Organization ==
=== Initial constitution (1972) ===
The first UMSC constitution was drafted in 1972 at a religious conference organised by Ugandan dictator Idi Amin. This constitution stated that the organisation would be led by a Supreme Council of eleven representatives from Uganda's 21 civil administrative districts. Any male Muslim in Uganda would be eligible to run or vote for this role. This council would serve for five-year terms and was mandated to meet at least once a year. At their first meeting, the council would elect the Chief Kadhi (later called Mufti) and his deputy, the Chairman of the Executive Council, the Secretary General, and two administrative bodies that would serve for a five-year term: the Executive Council and the College of Sheikhs.

The Executive Council would be responsible for handling the administrative tasks of the entire organisation and would be led by the Chairman, Chief Kadhi, Secretary General, and 11 other nominated members. The College of Sheiks would be the utmost authority on all religious matters for the Muslim community of Uganda and would be composed of the Chief Kadhi, his deputy, 21 district Kadhis, and a few elected Sheiks. There would also be a Council of Representatives composed of representative of all district counties and led by a district Kadhi.

This first constitution had several issues including equal district representation for districts with large variations in Muslim populations, lack of demarcation of responsibility amongst the newly created administrative bodies, and ambiguity regarding the relationship between the UMSC and the government.

=== Initial constitutional amendments (1982 & 1986) ===
The UMSC constitution was amended in 1982 and 1986. The second constitutional amendment was handled by Nsambu and Lubega Advocates, a law firm in Kampala.

=== Latest constitutional amendment (2022) ===
The last time that the UMSC constitution was amended was on 13 July 2022. The UMSC said that this constitutional amendment aimed to address the needs of previously excluded groups, such as women, youth, and the elderly, and large structural changes that had taken place since the last amendment in 1986. Despite the previous constitution stating that amendments can only be added by an independent committee appointed by a General Assembly, the 2022 amendments were added by a 21-person team led by former Secretary General Edris Kasenene.

The constitutional amendments primarily dealt with the required qualifications to run for Mufti. The maximum age cap was raised from 70 to 75, and a Master's degree in Sharia and Secular education was required. After a Mufti had served one 10-year term, he would be eligible to run for a second. Additionally, the amended constitution changed the election process so that the Mufti would be elected by the 22-member College of Sheiks; previously, Muftis were appointed by the 230-member General Assembly.

The qualifications to become Mufti in the amended constitution are as follows:

- "A Ugandan Sunni male Muslim,
- At least 40 years of age and not exceeding 75 years old,
- At least a holder of a Master's Degree in Sharia and Secular Education or their equivalents,
- Fluent in both Arabic and English,
- Following the footsteps of Prophet Muhammad;
- Respectable, properly married and a good practising Muslim
- With a clean track record free from offences under the National and Islamic laws,
- 10 years of working experience in a Muslim leadership position
- Serves a 10-year renewable term"

== History ==
=== Early Muslim organisations in Uganda ===
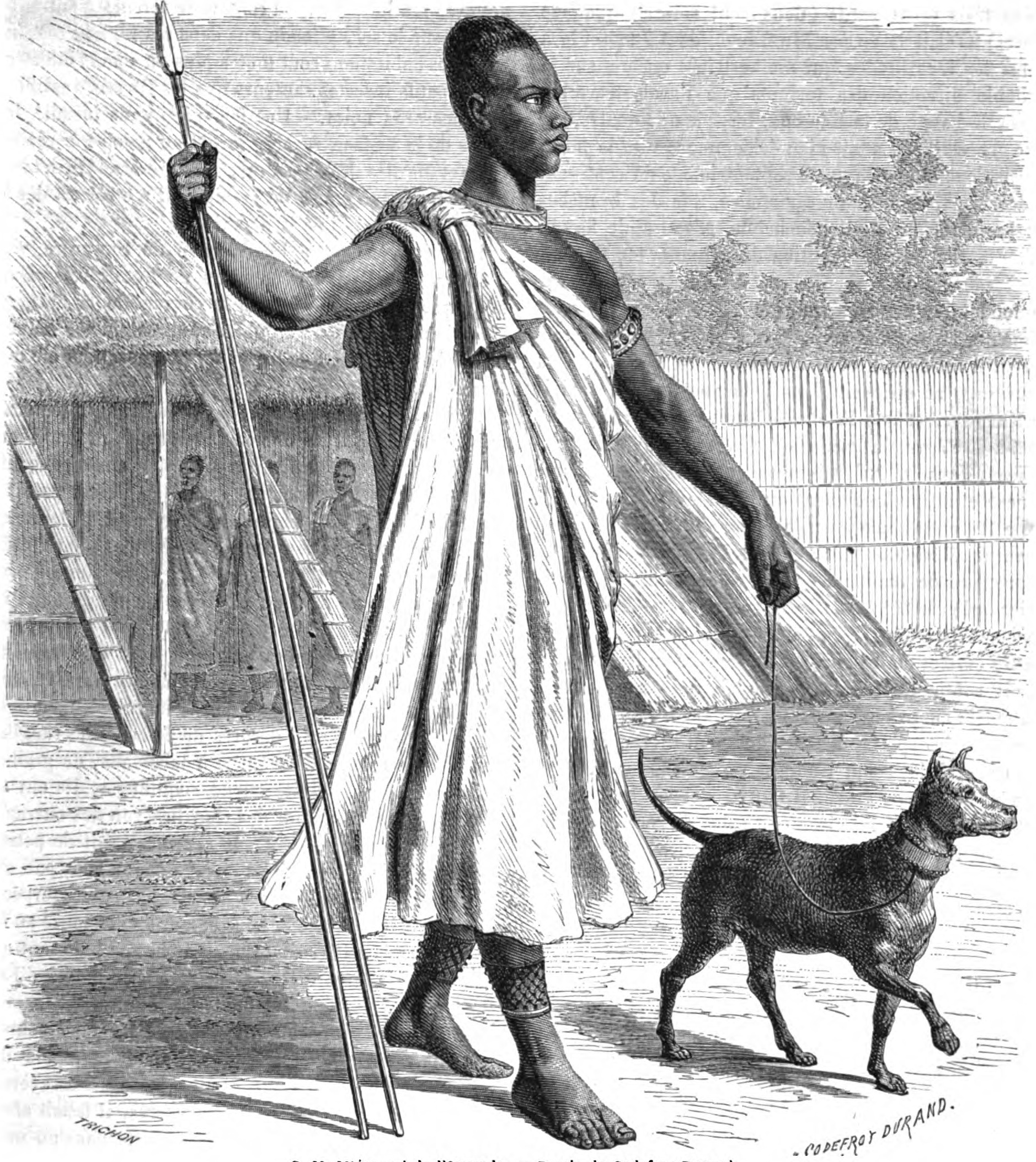
Muteesa I of Buganda, the 30th Kabaka of the Kingdom of Buganda, converted to Islam and imposed it as the state religion of Buganda.

The first authorities for the Islamic faith were rulers of the Kingdom of Buganda. The 30th Kabaka of Buganda, Muteesa I (r. 1856–1884), was the first Kabaka to convert to Islam, and claimed to be "the head of [the] Islamic religion". One of his sons, Kalema, the 33rd Kabaka of Buganda (r. 1888–1889), personally oversaw religious affairs and consulted a committee of religious scholars of differing faiths on religious matters. A prince of Buganda, Nuhu Mbogo Kyabasinga, rescinded his claim to the throne to become a leader for Muslims under the British administration of the Protectorate of Uganda. Through working directly with British colonial administrators and the Christian majority of Uganda, Mbogo was widely recognized as the utmost authority on the governance of Islam in the country.

Upon Mbogo's death in 1921, authority over the Muslim community was contested by two organisations: one centred in Butambala, and another in Kibuli. The Butambala faction was supported by Apollo Kaggwa and composed of the chiefs of Butambala, under the leadership of Twaib Magatto and Abdullah Ssekimwanyi. The Kibuli faction was led by Prince Badru Kakungulu, upon nomination by 34th Kabaka of Buganda Daudi Chewa II and other Muslim leaders. While initially the two groups only differed in leadership, gradual doctrinal differences that arose led to the creation of more Muslim organisations. Disagreements over the Friday Zuhr prayer resulted in the two groups splitting into the Uganda Muslim Community headquartered at Kibuli, the Zukhuli sect headquartered at Kawempe, and the African Muslim Community Natete-Bukoto. These three organisations coexisted with cordial competition until the founding of the National Association for the Advancement of Muslims (NAAM) in 1965, which sought to move the centre of Islam away from Buganda, which the three older groups fiercely opposed. Aside from these four, other smaller organisations were founded for specific groups, such as the Uganda Muslim Students Association for students, the Youngmen's Muslim Association for young men, and five organisations representing Muslim Asian Ugandans: Khoja Shia Ishnasir Jamat, Dawoodi Bohara Jamat Corporation, Dawoodi Bohora Limited, Muslim Sunni Association, and the Aga Khan Ismailia Community. All of these groups acted independently and had their own constitutions until Idi Amin organized a religious conference in Kabale in May and June 1971 to resolve the differences between the several religious communities in Uganda.

=== Creation of the UMSC ===
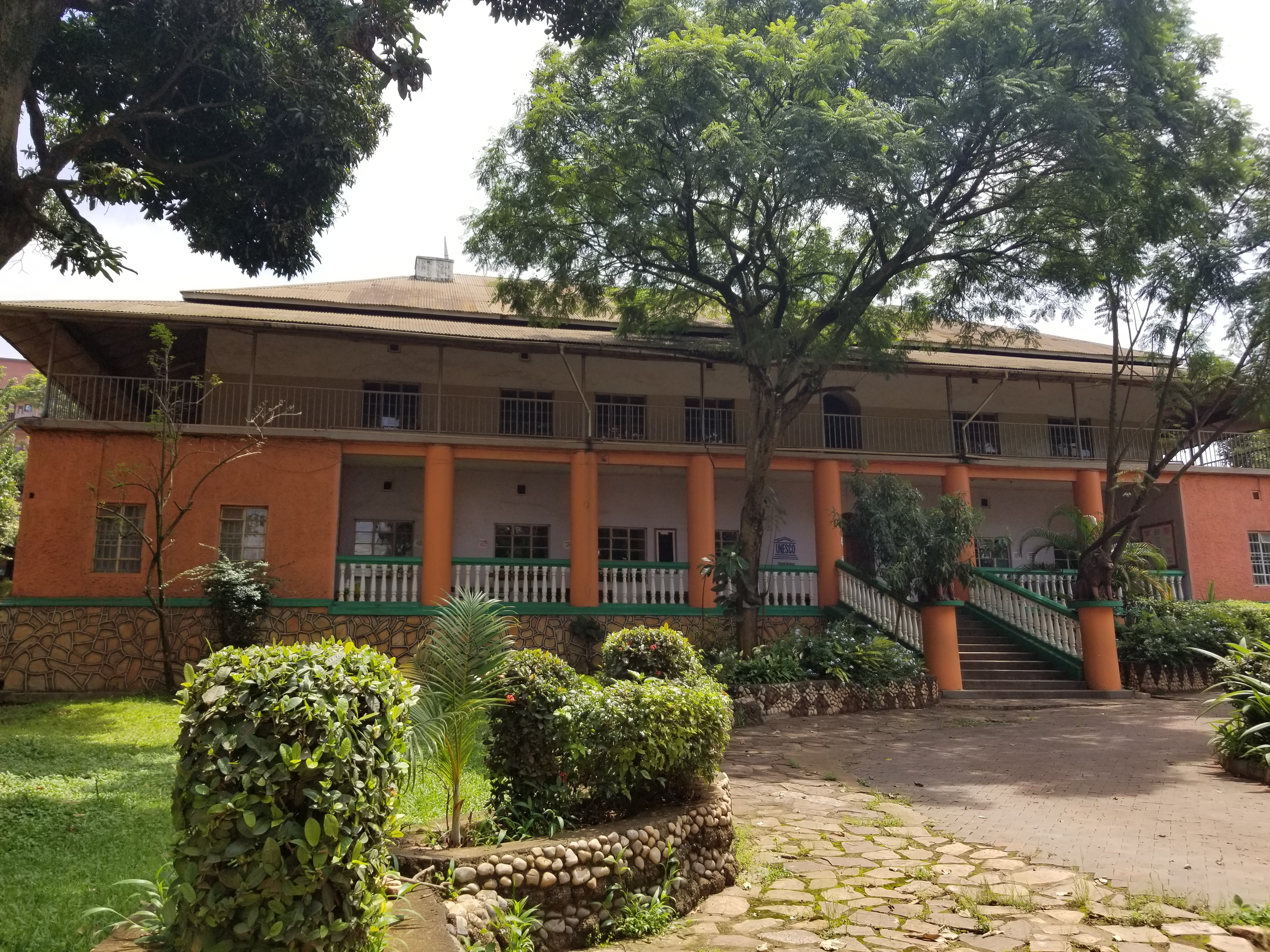
The Basiima House in Kampala was the first headquarters of the Uganda Muslim Supreme Council.

The UMSC was officially inaugurated on 1 June 1972 with much support by Muslims in Uganda and abroad. Kakungulu donated 20 acres of land to the organisation and relinquished his role as the leader of the Uganda Muslim Community, the largest Muslim group in Uganda up until that point. The organisation also received large donations from Saudi Arabia, Libya, the Central African Republic, and individual donors. It quickly became the richest landlord in the country after purchasing a large estate from George Franck Walusimbi Mpanga, the mayor of Kampala, and inheriting land belonging to Asian Muslims expelled from Uganda. These acquisitions enabled the UMSC to move its headquarters from the Basiima House, formerly Kaggwa's private residence, to the Kampala Jamatkhana mosque.

In 1973 and 1974, Uganda was admitted into the Organisation of Islamic Cooperation under representation by the UMSC, which contracted a Muslim company to build it a new mosque and headquarters.

=== Challenges faced by the UMSC ===
In 1975, without regard to the bureaucratic processes laid out in the UMSC constitution, the Ugandan government ousted the first Chief Kadhi, Sheikh Maulana Abdul Razak Matovu, and replaced him with Sheikh Yusuf Sulaiman Matovu. Amin dismissed Yusuf Matovu a year later, which left the UMSC without a leader. From 1975 to 1979, the UMSC was administered by Acting Secretary General Ahmad Mufanjala, but was under de facto control of Amin, who handled major decisions. Afraid to question Amin's authority, the UMSC failed to follow many of the responsibilities outlined in its constitution.

In 1979, Amin's regime was toppled and Muslims in Uganda faced intense persecution and violence due to their religion. Many, including most of the senior leadership of the UMSC, went into hiding or fled the country to escape discrimination. Almost all government officials wanted to dismantle the UMSC, which was seen as a remnant of Amin's dictatorship, and return administration of the Islamic community to the previous Muslim organisations. Kakungulu was consulted on the subject, and he and the group that he formerly led, the Uganda Muslim Community, were entrusted to find a solution. While Kakungulu felt that the UMSC should be maintained and reformed, the other Muslim leaders wanted to dismantle the organisation and instead work through the ones that predated it. Kakungulu called a meeting of 50 Sheiks and asked them to nominate a temporary leader from amongst themselves until a formal election could be held, but they presented Kakungulu with three Sheiks from whom he could choose: Ssemakula, Abdulzaak Matovu, and Kassimu Mulumba. Mulumba was fluent in Arabic and English, and had had both Western and Quranic education. For these reasons, Kakungulu selected Mulumba and his two delegates as interim leaders.

Kakungulu worked with his former rival Sheikh Abdu Kamulegeya, the leader of NAAM and of many Ugandan Muslims outside of Buganda, to organise a press conference to announce the transitional leadership and encourage unity within the country's Muslim community. The two agreed that the UMSC must be preserved and that Mulumba and his two deputies would be installed as the provisional leaders for a three-month period, until the country's Muslims could vote according to the UMSC's constitution. This press conference would be held in UMSC headquarters, and Kamulegeya would reassure his followers about this decision. After the press conference was held, Kakungulu became the Chairman of a temporary Executive Council, and Kamulegeya became a prominent member.

Following the establishment of this interim administration, the UMSC was able to function as an organisation again. From May to December 1979, it began to reappoint district Kadhis and organized a 1000-person pilgrimage of Ugandan Muslims to Mecca. Pressed to begin organising elections after the transitional Executive Council had overstayed its three-month term, the UMSC appointed a task force, led by Asumani Mbuubi and Sulaiman Kigundu, to collect data from various districts. In July 1980, preparations for elections finally began.

The Ugandan government warned Muslims to keep politics out of the UMSC elections. This prompted acting Chief Kadhi Mulumba to suspend sections in the UMSC constitution that dealt with elections, and expel the provisional Executive Council and Secretary General. The Executive Council responded in kind, dismissing Mulumba as Chief Kadhi. The council then called a meeting, at Makerere University, of the newly elected Supreme Council, which elected Kamulegeya as Chief Kadhi. A mediator from the Muslim World League was able to get the two factions of the UMSC, loyal to competing Chief Kadhis, to settle their differences. They agreed to preserve the legitimacy of the UMSC constitution, and affirm Mulumba as Chief Kadhi and Kamulegya his deputy, as well as to maintain the UMSC leadership elected at Makerere—in order to avoid new elections—while incorporating some members of Mulumba's faction into the leadership.

== Leadership ==
№	Portrait	Mufti	Term	Notes	Ref
1		Maulana Matovu	1972 – 1974		
2		Yusuf Matovu	1974 – 1978	Directly nominated by Idi Amin, instead of the Supreme Council as stated in the 1972 constitution.	
3		Kassim Mulumba	1979 – 1983	Personally chosen by Prince Badru Kakungulu.	
4		Abdul Obeid Kamulegeya	1983 – 1985	Elected by General Assembly at Makerere University	
5		Kassim Mulumba	1985 – 1986	Mulumba's 2nd term.	
6		Hussein Kakooza	1986 – 1991		
7		Saad Luwemba	1991 – 1997		
8		Muhammad Semakula	1997 – 2000		
9		Shaban Mubaje	3 December 2000 – current		
