= Dan Kimosho =

Ugandan politician

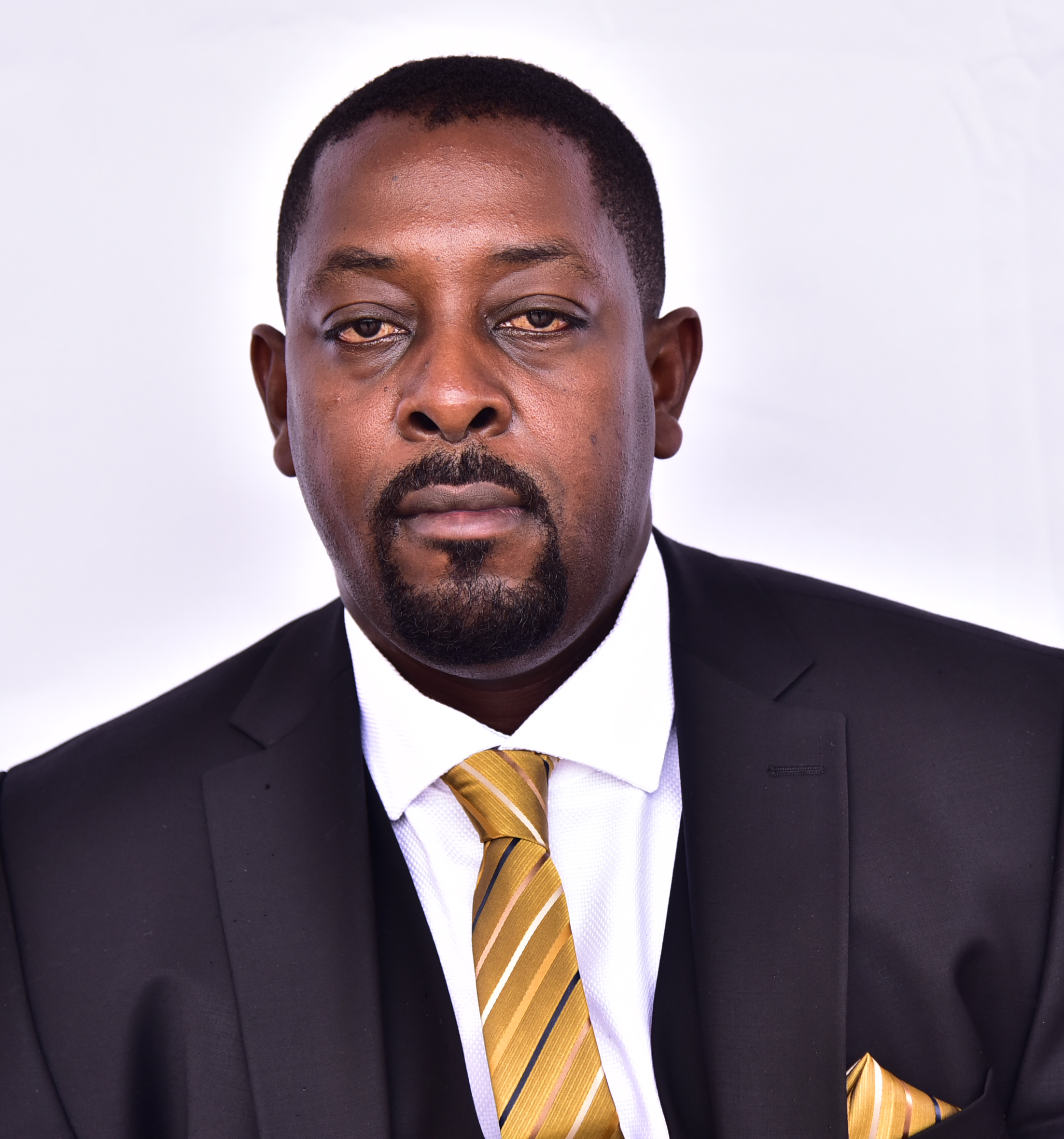
- Born: September 11, 1984 (age 41); Kazo County
- Citizenship: Ugandan
- Education: bachelor’s degree in journalism and mass communication
- Occupation: politician

Dan Atwijukire Kimosho (born September 11, 1984) is a Ugandan politician and a member of the Ugandan parliament representing Kazo County on the ticket of National Resistance Movement (NRM) party.

== Early life and education ==
Kimosho was born in Kazo County to Kosia Mugume and Peter Mugume. His early education started at Bugarihe Primary School before transferring to Kazo Model Primary School where he obtained his first school leaving certificate. He received his O’Level certificate at Buremba SS and then moved to Kampala where he completed his A’Level. After this, he was admitted to Uganda Christian University where he studied for a bachelor's degree in journalism and mass communication. Atwijukire interned at Radio West and later became a host of talk shows before moving to Kampala where he worked as a freelance reporter.

== Political career ==
Kimosho first ran for the Western Youth Member of Parliament in 2011 but lost. He ran for the Kazo County parliamentary seat in the January 14, 2021 general election on the ticket of NRM polling 17,733 votes defeating the incumbent member of the parliament representing the district, Gordon Bafaki who received 10,235 votes. Upon inauguration to the parliament he was appointed as spokesperson of the 11th Parliament.
