= Lillian Zawedde =

Ugandan Woodball Player

Lillian Zawedde is a Ugandan female woodball player who plays for the Ndejje University Woodball team. Lillian with Janet Nakkazi, Catherine Armusgut, Sandra Kirabo and Grace Kwarisiima are the founders of the Angels Basketball Club in Uganda.

== Background and education ==
Lillian Zawedde was born in 1987 to a Musoga mother and Muganda father in Jinja District, Uganda. Zawedde is the mother to a 15 year old Martha Precious Kisakye. Lillian went to Jinja Secondary School for her O' Level and to Crane High School for her A' level attending all on sports scholarships. She then joined Ndejje University in 2009 where she graduated with a bachelor’s degree in Journalism and Mass Communication. Zawedde also attained a Master’s in Marketing also from Ndejje University.

== Sporting career ==
Zawedde started her sporting career in secondary school where she played basketball, cricket, netball and football at Jinja Secondary School. When she joined Crane High School, she majored in basketball and netball. In 2009, after leaving high school, she joined the Amazon Rhinos as their point guard. Later, she joined the Magic Stormers. With the help of Janet Nakkazi, Catherine Armusgut, Sandra Kirabo and Grace Kwarisiima, Zawedde created the Angels Basketball Club in 2013. At Ndejje University, she started playing woodball in 2009. She has played woodball for Ndejje University at the student level and the Corporate Club level.

=== Woodball career ===
Zawedde first featured in the Inter-University games where she won gold. She was named Uganda's woodball Most Valuable Player from 2010 to 2017 only falling to Joan Mukoova in 2015. Zawedde has been ranked Uganda's female number one since 2010 and in 2014 she was ranked as Africa's Number one. On the international scene, she first featured at the World University Woodball Championship in Melaka, Malaysia. Zawedde has so far featured at four woodball world cups; the 2014 World Cup in Sanya, China, Jeju, South Korea in 2016 where Zawedde won bronze and Uganda finished fourth at the championship, and 2018 in Thailand where she won gold and the team won team bronze. In 2017, she represented Uganda at the World Beach Woodball Championships in Indonesia. Zawedde has also played at numerous international events including the 13th Singapore Lion City Cup Woodball event and the 17th Malaysia Open Woodball Championship all in 2013 and also at events in China and Hong Kong. In 2014, she was named the Uganda woodball team captain. Zawedde in 2016 won gold in the mixed doubles categories with Onesmus Atamba at the Korean Woodball Championship in 2016.
