= Morali =

Morali or Moralı may refer to:

== People ==
=== Surname ===
- Jacques Morali (1947–1991), French singer-songwriter
- Jonathan Morali (born 1980), musician and composer
- Laurent Morali (born 1975), French-born, US-based real estate developer
- Hasan Moralı (born 1957), association football coach

=== Given name ===
- Moralı Ali Pasha (died 1735), Ottoman statesman
- Moralı Ibrahim Pasha (died 1725), Ottoman statesman and grand admiral

== Other uses ==
- Moralı, Germencik
