= Grace Kesande Bataringaya =

Ugandan politician (born 1970)

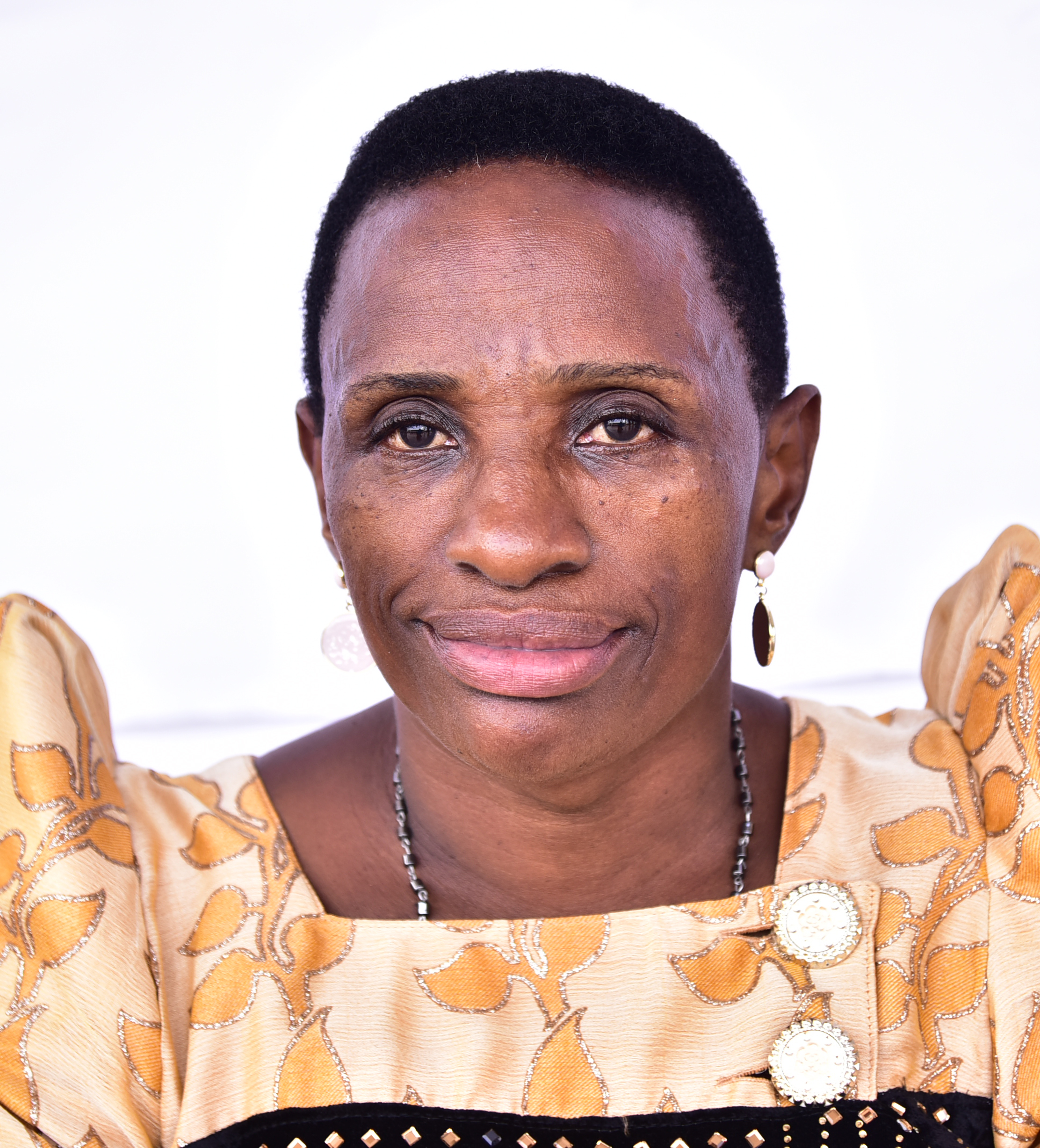
- Born: 4 September 1970 (age 55)
- Citizenship: Ugandan
- Education: Makerere University
- Occupation: Politician
- Political party: National Resistance Movement

Grace Kesande Bataringaya (born 4 September 1970) is a Ugandan politician and member of parliament. In 2011, she was elected as a representative in parliament for Rubirizi district.

She is a member of the ruling National Resistance Movement political party.

== Education ==
She completed her primary level education in 1983 at Kyanamira primary school, In 1987, she completed her Uganda Certificate of Education (UCE) for lower secondary education at Hornyby girls secondary school in Kabale. She completed her advanced secondary level known as Uganda Advanced Certification of Education (UACE) in 1990 at Seseme girls secondary school in Kisoro. In 1993, she graduated from Makerere University with a bachelor's degree of Arts in Social science. in Kampala.

== Other responsibilities ==
She is a director in charge of Livelihood Community Volunteer Initiative for Development (COVOID), a local NGO operating in Rubirizi district.
