= Pyarali Merali =

Ugandan architect (born 1930)

Pyarali Merali (born December 1930) is a Ugandan architect, known for his work in Pakistan. He was known as "one of the best architects of our time". He moved to Karachi, Pakistan, where in less than a decade he worked on over 300 projects, including schools, residences, banks, offices and sports facilities. His firm was very well known and where many architects launched their careers. He left his firm in the hands of two brothers after departing to Canada. The firm is now known as ASA.

== Early life and background ==
Pyarali Merali was born in the early 20th century in East Africa to a family of Indian descent, part of the broader South Asian diaspora that settled in Uganda during the colonial period. Like many Asian entrepreneurs of his generation, he became involved in trade and commerce at a young age.

== Business career ==
Merali is best known for his partnership with Muljibhai Madhvani, the founder of Madhvani Group. Together, they helped expand the group's operations, particularly in sugar manufacturing through Kakira Sugar Works, which became one of Uganda's most important agro-industrial enterprises.

== Expulsion and exile ==
In 1972, during the regime of Idi Amin, Merali, along with thousands of other Asians, were expelled from Uganda as part of the expulsion of Asians from Uganda. This led to the collapse of many businesses, including those associated with the Madhvani Group.

Following his expulsion, Merali relocated abroad, where he continued business activities and maintained ties with the Ugandan Asian diaspora.

== Return and legacy ==
After the fall of Idi Amin's regime in 1979 and particularly during the government of Yoweri Museveni, policies were introduced to encourage the return of expelled Asians and the restoration of their properties. Members of the Madhvani Group, including associates of Merali, gradually returned to Uganda and rebuilt their enterprises.
