= Nakibus Lakara =

Ugandan general

Lieutenant General Nakibus Lakara
- Born: 1960 (age 65–66); Uganda
- Citizenship: Uganda
- Education: National Defence College, Kenya; University of Nairobi
- Occupation: Military officer
- Years active: 1990 – present
- Known for: Military matters

James Nakibus Lakara, commonly known as Nakibus Lakara, is a lieutenant general in the Uganda People's Defence Force (UPDF). Since June 2016, he has been the commander of the Uganda Rapid Deployment Capability Centre based in Jinja in the Eastern Region of Uganda. From April 2015 until June 2016, he served as the deputy force commander of the African Union Mission to Somalia (AMISOM) and was in charge of logistical support. From July 2013 until April 2015, he served as the commanding officer of the UPDF 3rd Division, based in Moroto.

== Background and education ==
He was born in January 1960 in Kotido District in the Karamoja sub-region. He earned a Diploma in International Studies in 2012 from the Institute of Diplomacy and International Studies at the University of Nairobi, Kenya.

== Military career ==
In the 1990s while at the rank of brigadier, Lakara served as the commanding officer of the UPDF 2nd Division based in Mbarara. Later, he served as the UPDF chief of staff but was relieved of his post and court marshalled on account of "ghost soldiers in the army". Following the dismissal of some of the charges, and acquittal on others, he remained undeployed from 2003 until 2011 when he was admitted to the National Defence College, Kenya for a senior staff strategic course. In April 2015, he was promoted to major general and posted to Somalia with AMISOM.

In February 2019, he was promoted to the rank of lieutenant general, in an exercise that witnessed the promotion of over 2,000 UPDF men and women.

== Family ==
Lakara is married.

== See also ==
- Michael Nyarwa
- Dick Olum
- David Muhoozi
- Leopold Kyanda
- Katumba Wamala
