= Gad Gasatura =

Ugandan aviation expert

- Born: Ntungamo District, Uganda
- Citizenship: Ugandan
- Education: City University of London (Master of Science in Transport Management)
- Occupations: Professional Pilot, Aviation Engineer, Business Consultant
- Years active: 1995–present
- Known for: Aviation, Business Management
- Title: Chairman of Uganda Air Cargo Corporation Limited

Gad Gasatura is a Ugandan airline transport pilot, transport management expert and former politician, who served as the Chairperson of Uganda National Airlines Company, Uganda's national flag carrier, in 2018 and 2019. Since February 2023, he is the chairman of Uganda Air Cargo Corporation, a cargo and charter airline owned by the Government of Uganda and administered by the Uganda Ministry of Defence.

== Background and education ==
Gasatura was born in Ntungamo District, in the Western Region of Uganda. He attended Kings College Budo for his high school education, in the early 1970s. He is a qualified professional airline pilot. He also has a Master of Science degree in Transport Management from City University of London.

== Career ==
Gasatura was a member of the Constituent Assembly, which promulgated the 1995 Ugandan Constitution. He is remembered for threatening to secede if the Banyarwanda were not recognized as a Ugandan ethnic group. Later, he served as an Assistant Superintendent of Police in the Uganda Police Force. He has also served as a pilot for the Christian organisation Mission Aviation Fellowship.

== Other responsibilities ==
Gad Gasatura has served on the Board of Directors at Barclays Bank of Uganda, Diamond Trust Bank (Uganda) and at the Civil Aviation Authority of Uganda.

In 2005, Captain Gasatura was named as head of a team of investigators to probe the crash of an Antonov An-12, registered in the Democratic Republic of the Congo as 9Q-CIH, which crashed, soon after takeoff from Entebbe International Airport, on Saturday, 8 January 2005, killing all six crew. The cause of the crash was determined to be "engine failure and overloading".

== See also ==
- Transport in Uganda
- List of airports in Uganda
- Kwatsi Alibaruho
- Michael Etiang
- Ali Kiiza
- Naomi Karungi
- Kenneth Kiyemba
- Brian Mushana Kwesiga
