= Frances Akello =

Ugandan politician, farmer, and educator

- Born: 1936 (age 89–90); Uganda
- Education: Makerere University (University of Leeds)
- Occupations: Educator, farmer, politician

Frances Akello (born 1936) is a Ugandan farmer, educator and former politician. She served on the Uganda Legislative Council as a member of the Democratic Party from 1959 to 1961, one of the first African women to serve on the council.

She was educated at Magoro Primary School, Toroma Primary School and Ngora convent school. She completed a teaching course in Namagunga in Mukono District in 1958 and received a diploma from Makerere University in 1966. With the help of a scholarship, she took a course at the University of Leeds on how to teach English.

Akello was working as a tutor at St Mary's Teachers Training College when she was nominated and elected to the legislative council in 1958. She served as a member of the council's flag committee, charged with designing a flag for the country on its independence. She chose not to run for a seat in the country's first National Assembly because she would have to run against her mentor Cuthbert Joseph Obwangor.

== See also ==
- Hellen Asamo
- Hellena Asamoah Hassan
