= Kamanda Bataringaya =

Ugandan politician

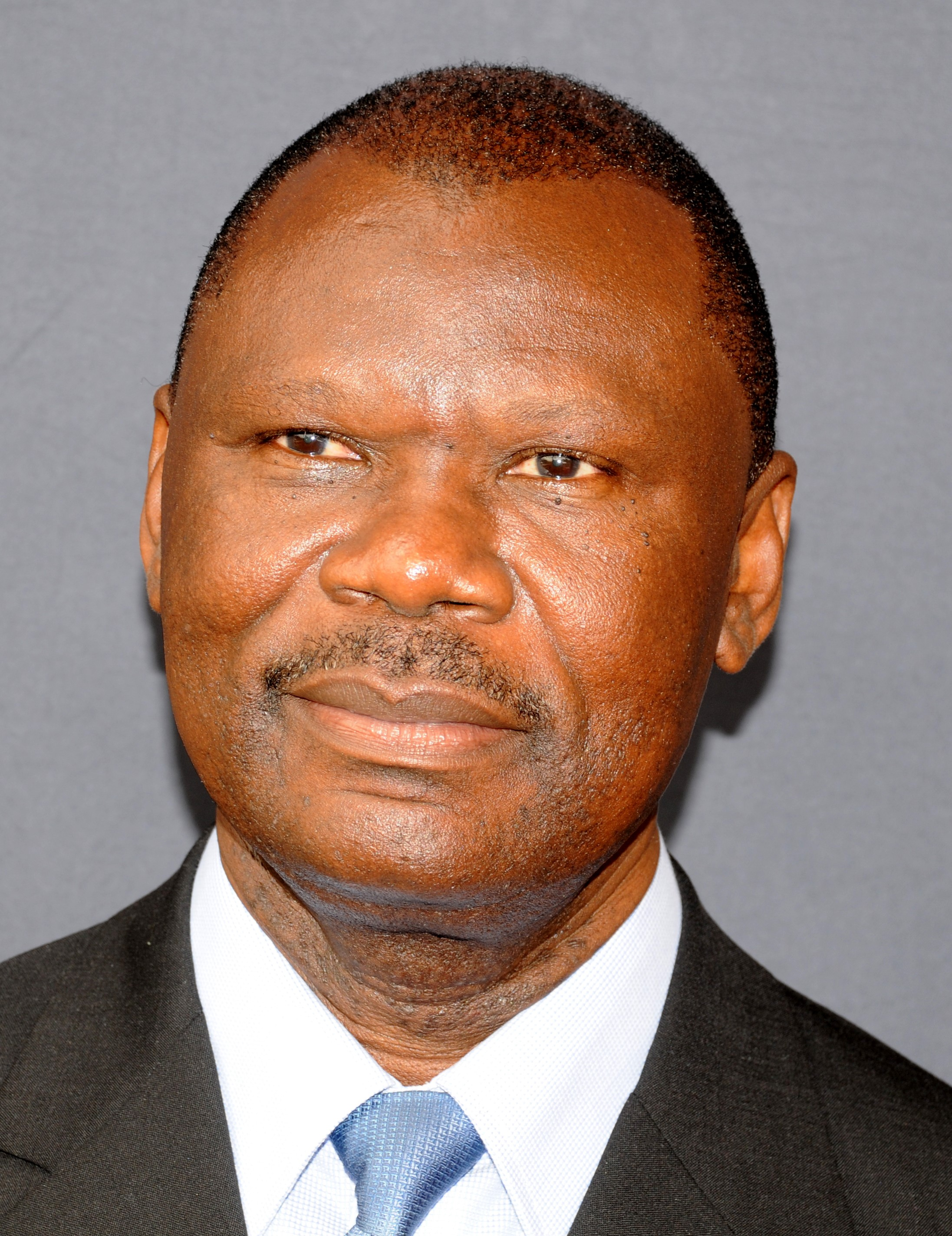
- Born: 24 December 1959 (age 66); Uganda
- Education: Kharkiv National Medical University (Doctor of Medicine); International Christian Medical Institute (Diploma in Health Management); Nkumba University (Master of Business Administration); University of the Western Cape (Master of Public Health)
- Occupations: Physician and politician
- Years active: 1990 — present
- Known for: Politics
- Title: State Minister for Primary Education

Kamanda Bataringaya is a Ugandan physician, politician and former diplomat. He is the current State Minister of Labor and Industrial Relations in the Cabinet of Uganda. He was appointed to that position on 1 March 2015. Before that, from 16 February 2009 until 1 March 2015, he served as the State Minister for Primary Education. In the cabinet reshuffle of 27 May 2011, he retained his cabinet post. He also serves as the elected Member of Parliament for "Bwamba County", Bundibugyo District.

== Background and education ==
He was born in Bundibugyo District on 24 December 1959. Bataringaya holds the degree of Doctor of Medicine (MD), obtained in 1990 from Kharkiv National Medical University, in Kharkiv, Ukraine. He also holds the degree of Master of Business Administration (MBA), obtained in 2003 from Nkumba University in Entebbe, Uganda. His degree of Master of Public Health (MPH), was awarded in 2009, by the University of the Western Cape, in Cape Town, South Africa. Bataringaya also holds a Diploma in Health Management from the International Christian Medical Institute in Canada.

== Career ==
He served as a Medical Officer at Mulago National Referral Hospital from 1990 until 1992. He then served as Medical Director of Mityana District Hospital, in Mityana, from 1992 until 1996. In 1994, he was elected to the Constituent Assembly which drafted the 1995 Ugandan Constitution, serving in that capacity until 1995. In 1996, he was appointed Uganda's Ambassador to the Democratic Republic of the Congo, serving in that capacity until 2000. In 2001, he entered politics, contesting for the parliamentary seat of Bwamba County, Bundibugyo District. He was elected and was re-elected in 2006 and 2011. In 2001 Kamanda Bataringaya was appointed State Minister for Mineral Development, serving in that capacity until 2009. On 16 February 2009, he was reassigned to the Ministry of Education, as State Minister for Primary Education.

== Personal life ==
He is married. He belongs to the National Resistance Movement political party. He is reported to have special interest in medical research and politics.

== See also ==
- Parliament of Uganda
- Cabinet of Uganda
- Bundibugyo District
