= Abdullah Ssekimwanyi =

Sheikh Abdullah Ssekimwanyi
- Born: Uganda
- Occupations: Religious leader, Islamic reformer
- Known for: First Ugandan to perform Hajj Founder, Africa Muslim Community, Juma Sect
- Notable work: Translating Friday khutuba into local languages

Sheikh Abdullah Ssekimwanyi was the first Ugandan to make a holy pilgrimage to Mecca in Saudi Arabia in the 1920s. Making a pilgrimage to Mecca is the 5th pillar or obligation of the faith Islam.

On his return, he urged Muslims to stop holding the daily Dhuhuri (noon prayer on Friday). He also started translating Friday khutuba (sermons) in Luganda and other local languages. He is the founder of Africa Muslim Community, Juma Sect, of Bukoto-Nateete. As of July 2009, there are an estimated 3,916,717 Muslims in Uganda.

== See also ==
- Islam in Uganda
