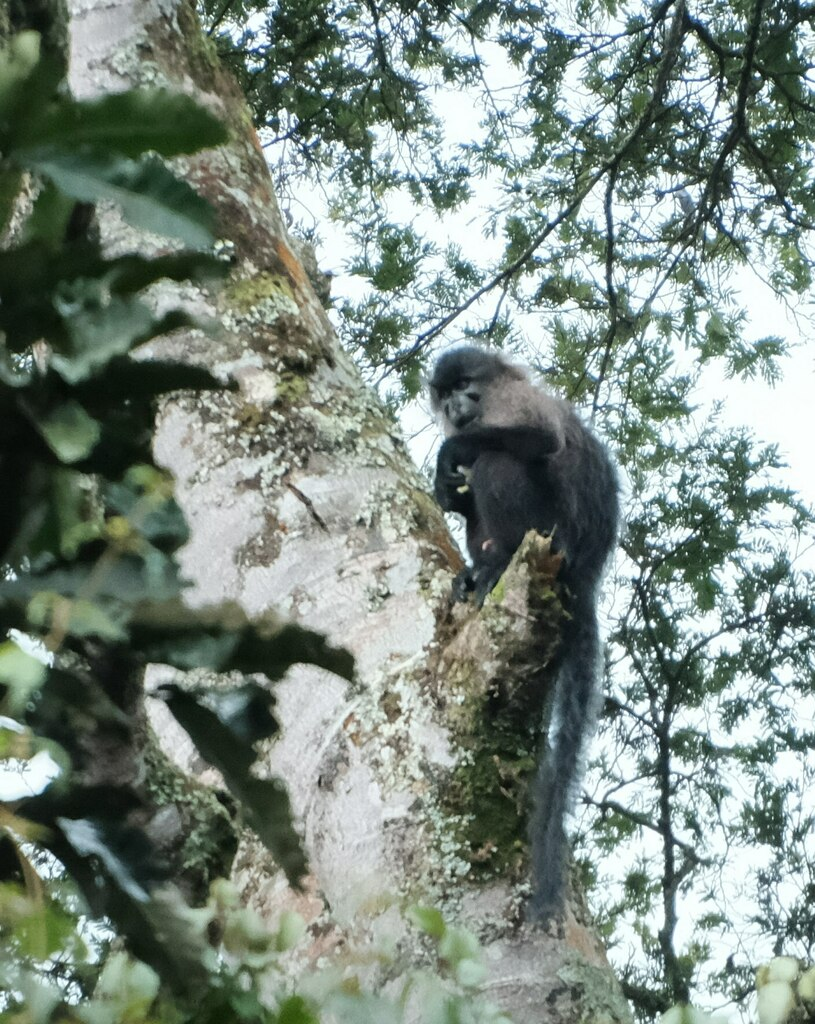

Conservation status
- Near Threatened (IUCN 3.1)

Scientific classification
- Kingdom: Animalia
- Phylum: Chordata
- Class: Mammalia
- Order: Primates
- Suborder: Haplorhini
- Infraorder: Simiiformes
- Family: Cercopithecidae
- Genus: Lophocebus
- Species: L. albigena
- Subspecies: L. a. johnstoni

Trinomial name
- Lophocebus albigena johnstoni Lydekker, 1900

= Johnston's mangabey =

Species of Old World monkey

Johnston's mangabey (Lophocebus albigena johnstoni) is a subspecies of the gray-cheeked mangabey (L. albigena), a crested mangabey in the family Cercopithecidae. It was elevated to full species status in 2007, alongside Osman Hill's mangabey (L. osmani) and the Uganda mangabey (L. ugandae), but is still generally considered as a subspecies.
