= Mutukula =

Mutukula may refer to several places:

- Mutukula, Tanzania, a town in Kagera Region, northwestern Tanzania, on the border with Uganda
- Mutukula, Uganda, a town in Rakai District, south-central Uganda, on the border with Tanzania
  - Mutukula Airport, a small civilian and military airport in Uganda
