= Boaz Ninsiima =

Ugandan politician (born 1975)

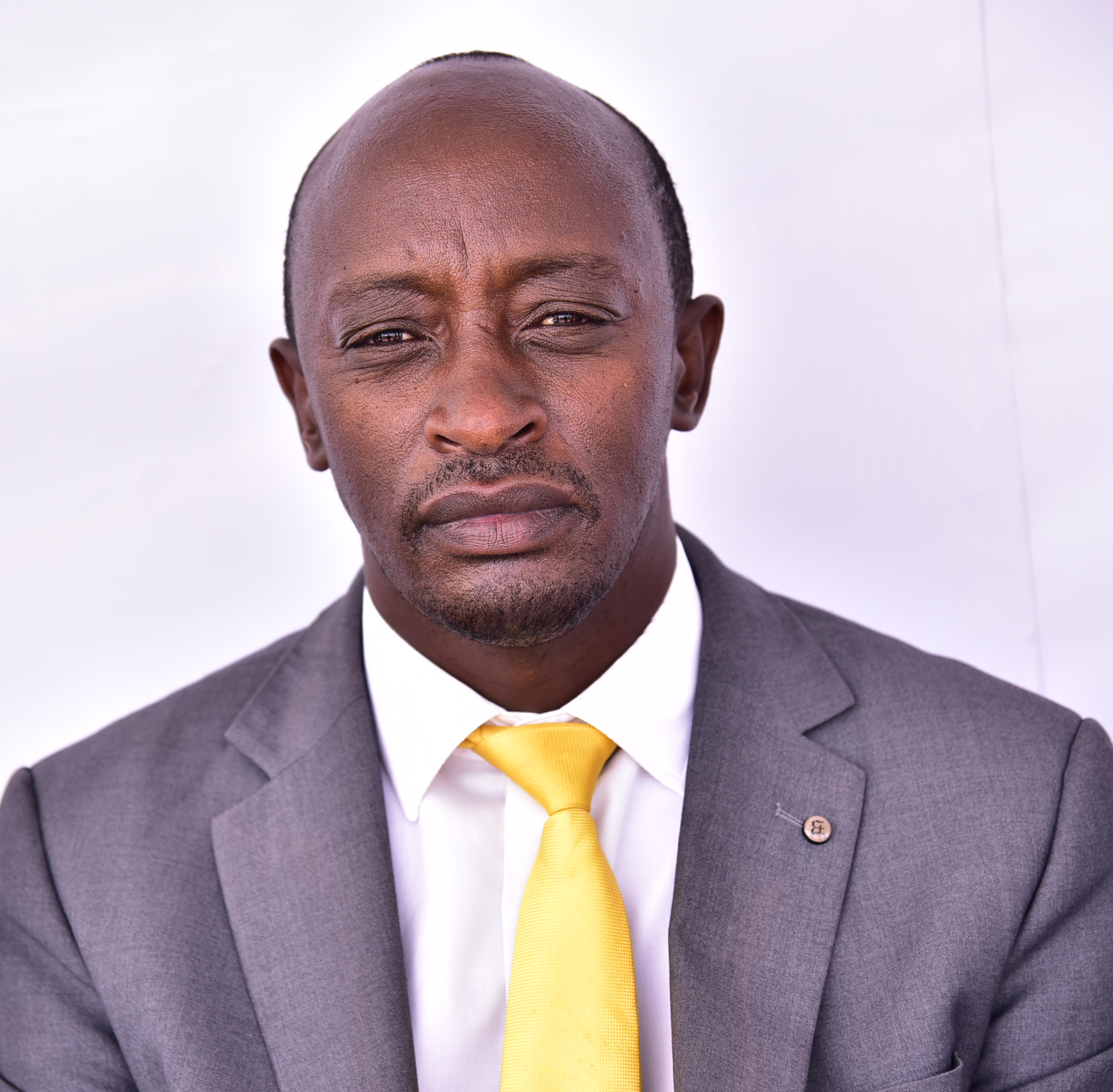

Honorable

Personal details
- Born: Boaz Ninsiima; 28 December 1975 (age 50) Rakai, Uganda
- Education: Makerere University (Diploma in Medical Laboratory Technology (DMLT)); Mbarara University (Bachelor of Medical Laboratory Science)
- Occupation: Medical laboratory scientist, politician
- Known for: Health technology, politics

Boaz Kasirabo Ninsiima (born 28 December 1975) is a Ugandan medical laboratory scientist and politician. He was the elected Member of Parliament for Kooki County and a representative for NRM, the ruling political party in Uganda in the 10th and 11th parliament. He was a member of Uganda Medical Lab Association and the NRM Parliamentary Caucus and serves on the Committee on Physical Infrastructure in the 10th Parliament of Uganda.

Ninsiima is a former lab technical officer for Infectious Diseases Research Collaboration (IDRC); laboratory focal person for Rakai District; laboratory assistant for Kasaali Health Centre III and a former manager and nursing assistant at Kibaale Community Clinic.

== Early life and education ==
Ninsiima was born in Kooki, Rakai District on 28 December 1975 in an Anglican family of the Banyankore. He had his primary education in his home district of Rakai at Ahmadiyya Primary School, a government owned primary school in Kalungi, attaining his PLE certification in 1993.

He then attended Sserinya Secondary School for his O-Level education, attaining a UCE certification in 1997. For his higher education, he joined the School of Medical Laboratory Training at Mengo Hospital and attained a medical laboratory technicians certification in 2007.

Ninsiima further advanced to Makerere University where he attained a Diploma in Medical Laboratory Technology in 2009 and a Bachelor of Medical Laboratory Science (BMLSc) in the year 2013.

== Career ==
=== Beginnings ===
Ninsiima started his professional career in 2000 as a nursing assistant at Kibaale Community Clinic and was later on promoted to the managerial role of clinic manager at the same healthcare facility in 2005. In 2006, he secured employment as a laboratory assistant at Kasaali Health Centre III. In 2009, he worked as a laboratory focal person for Rakai District and then as a lab technical officer for Infectious diseases Research Collaboration (IDRC) in 2010 up until 2014 when he resigned to join elective politics.

=== Political career ===
In 2015, Ninsiima joined elective politics on the National Resistance Movement ticket, winning both the party's primary elections and the 2016 general elections thereby becoming a member of the 10th Parliament for the Pearl of Africa representing Kooki County in Rakai District. In the 10th Parliament, Ninsiima serves on the Committee on Physical Infrastructure and he is also a member of the NRM Parliamentary Caucus.

In 2021, he was re-elected to the position of Member of parliament. In the eleventh parliament, he served on the Public Accounts Committee (Central Government).

During the 2026 general elections, Tayebwa Didas Kabumbuza was elected as the member of parliament for Kooki county replacing Boaz Ninsiima.

== See also ==
- Rakai District
- National Resistance Movement
