= Kalisizo General Hospital =

- Uganda Ministry of Health

Geography
- Location: Kalisizo, Rakai District, Central Region, Uganda
- Coordinates: 00°32′08″S 31°37′22″E

Organisation
- Care system: Public
- Type: General

Services
- Emergency department: I
- Beds: 120

History
- Founded: 2000

Links
- Other links: Hospitals in Uganda

Kalisizo General Hospital, also Kalisizo Hospital, is a hospital in the Central Region of Uganda.

== Location ==
The hospital is located in the town of Kalisizo, in Kyotera District, on the Masaka–Mutukula Road, about 30 kilometres (19 mi) southwest of Masaka Regional Referral Hospital. The coordinates of the hospital are:0°32'08.0"S, 31°37'22.0"E (Latitude:-0.535543; Longitude:31.622779).

== Overview ==
Kalisizo General Hospital is government regional referral hospital with a bed capacity of 120. The hospital treats many cases of malaria, particularly among children. As with most government hospitals in the country, Kalisizo hospital has challenges related to lack of appropriate medical equipment, lack of blood, and lack of appropriate medicines.

== See also ==
- List of hospitals in Uganda
