= Kaka Lubega Ismail Uthuman =

Ugandan Politician

Honorable Kaka Lubega Ismail Uthman

Member of Parliament Kakuuto
- Incumbent
- Assumed office 25 May 2026
- President: Yoweri Kaguta Museveni
- Preceded by: Geoffrey Lutaaya

Regional Whip of Southwestern Buganda Region NRM

Personal details
- Born: Kaka Lubega Ismail Uthman; 1 June 1980 (age 46)
- Citizenship: Uganda
- Party: National Resistance Movement
- Occupation: Business Man, politician, Islamic scholar
- Known for: Politics; Member of the 12th Parliament of Uganda

Kaka Lubega Ismail Uthuman (born 1 June 1980) is a member of the 12th parliament of the Republic of Uganda, affiliated with the National Resistance Movement (NRM), representing Kakuuto Constituency in Kyotera District.

== Biography ==
In 2009, He graduated with a Bachelor's in Islamic Studies and Arabic language from the Islamic University of Medina. In 2003, attained a Diploma in Journalism from Azzaytuna University, Tarahona, Libya.

In 2021, he contested for the seat of Member of Parliament for Kakuuto Constituency, where he came 4th with the race won by the National Unity Platform (NUP) candidate Geofrey Lutaaya.

In 2026, He came back to the race where he won the election to represent the constituency after being backed as the NRM flag bearer.

== See also ==
- List of members of the twelfth Parliament of Uganda
- Haruna Kasolo Kyeyune
