= Anatoli Wasswa =

- Born: Anatoli Wasswa Kizito; 15 February 1927; Kigo Village, Singo County, Mityana District, Uganda
- Died: 3 January 2023 (aged 95); Mulago National Referral Hospital, Kampala, Uganda
- Burial place: Bannakaroli Brothers Cemetery, Kiteredde, Kyotera District, Uganda
- Citizenship: Ugandan
- Education: Busubizi Teachers Training College; Katigondo National Major Seminary
- Occupations: Catholic priest; religious brother; herbalist; author; teacher
- Known for: St Luke Uganda Herbal Clinic; St Luke Community Museum
- Notable work: Unveiling Witchcraft
- Awards: Medal for promoting the use of herbal medicine (2017)

Anatoli Wasswa also known as Anatoli Wasswa Kizito (15 February 1927 – 3 January 2023) was a Ugandan Catholic religious brother, priest, herbalist and author.

== Early life and education background ==
Anatoli was born on 15 February 1927 in Kigo Village, Singo County, in Mityana District, Uganda. He began his education at a primary school in Kigo, where he started Primary One in 1941 after attending catechism classes. In 1950, he joined Busubizi Teachers Training College in Mityana, where he trained as a teacher before later studying for the priesthood at Katigondo National Major Seminary.

== Priesthood ==
Anatoli became a religious brother in the Bannakaroli Brothers, also known as the Brothers of St. Charles Lwanga, in 1948. In 1970, he joined Katigondo National Major Seminary to study for the priesthood. He was ordained a priest in 1978 and became known as Father Anatoli Wasswa.

== Career ==
After his teacher training, Wasswa worked as an educator and later served as an accountant for the congregation of Bannakaloli Brothers. He later researched herbal medicine with Sister Rosalina at Bwanda and Père Perine Perinate, a French White Father, who provided him with guidance on herbal formulas and their preparation and mixing.

He established St Luke Uganda Herbal Clinic in Kyotera. The clinic later expanded to other locations, including Kibuye in Kampala and Nyamitanga in Mbarara. He also founded the St Luke Community Museum in Kyotera District as part of his efforts to preserve and promote traditional knowledge and cultural objects.

== Writings ==
Anatoli wrote Geography textbooks for lower-primary pupils and authored a book titled Unveiling Witchcraft, which discusses practices associated with witchcraft.

== Recognition ==
On 26 October 2017, Anatoli received a medal from President Yoweri Museveni in recognition of his work in promoting the use of herbal medicine.

== Death ==
Anatoli died on 3 January 2023 at Mulago National Referral Hospital in Kampala after suffering from heart-related complications. He was buried on 9 January 2023 at the cemetery of the Bannakaroli Brothers in Kiteredde, Kyotera District.

== See also ==
- Lawrence Mbwega
- Anne Nasimiyu Wasike
- Giuseppe Ambrosoli
- Celestino Obua
