= Rakai =

Town in Uganda

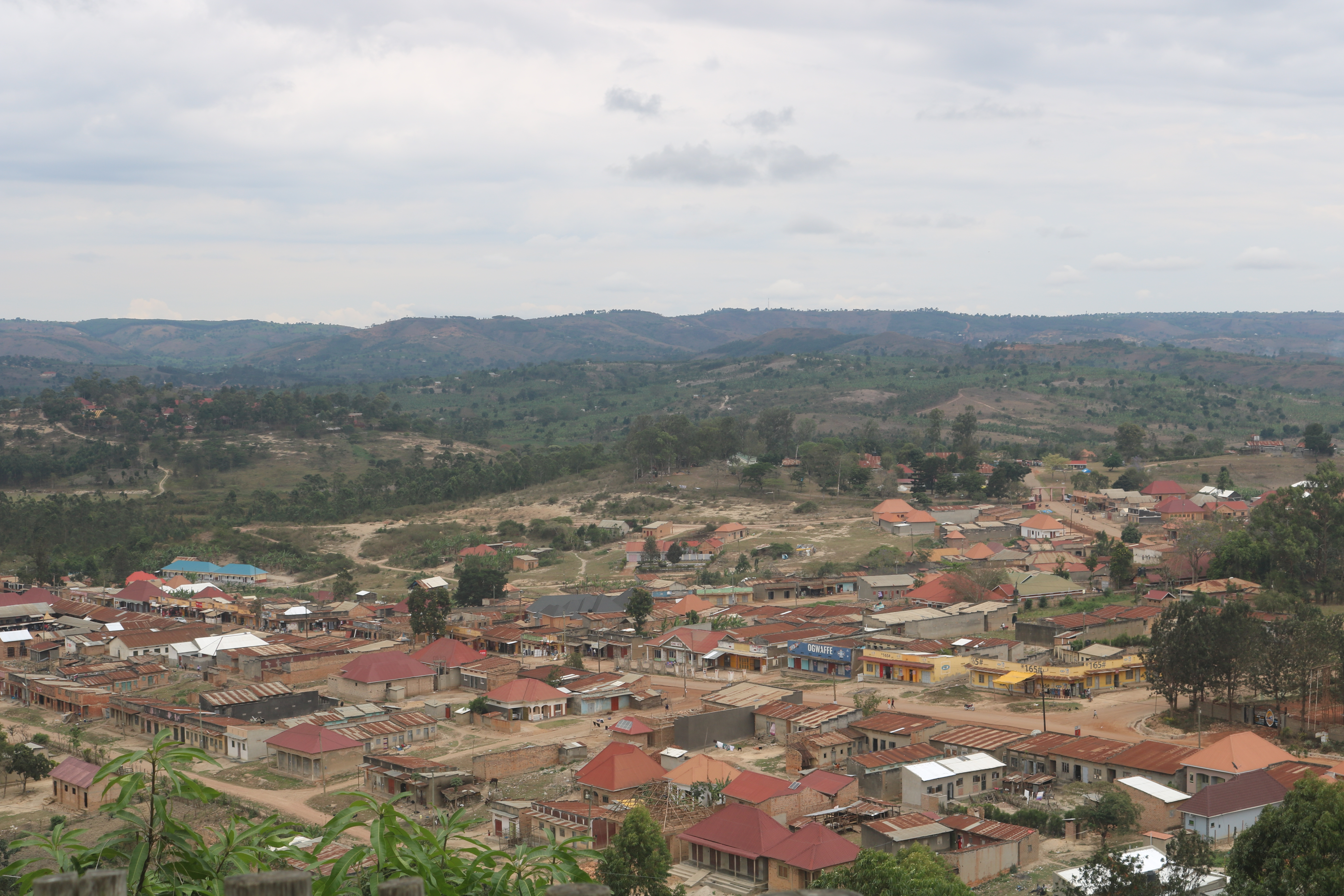
- The aerial view of Rakai Town

- Map of Uganda showing the location of Rakai.
- Coordinates: 00°42′36″S 31°24′18″E
- Country: Uganda
- Region: Central Uganda
- District: Rakai District
- Elevation: 1,280 m (4,200 ft)

Population (2020 Estimate)
  - Total: 8,500
- Time zone: UTC+3 (EAT)

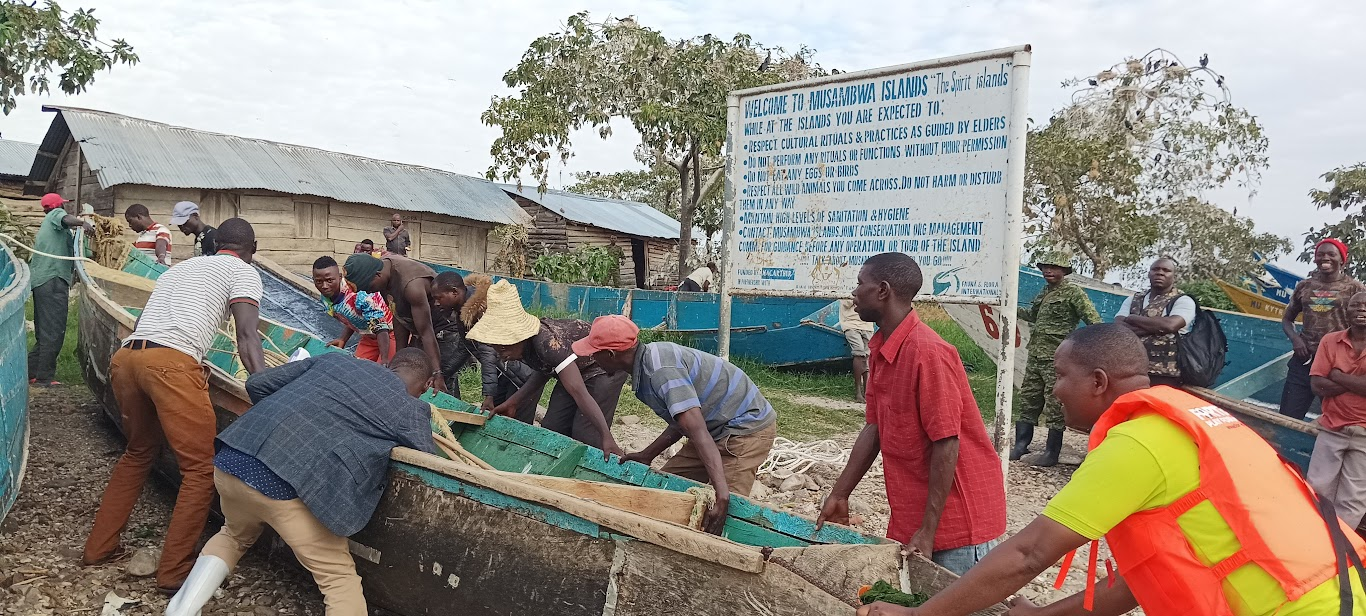
Rakai, near the shores of Lake Victoria

Rakai is a town in the Central Region of Uganda. It is the site of the headquarters of Rakai District. Other towns in the district include Kalisizo, Kyotera Kakuuto and Mutukula.

== Geography ==
The nearest town is Kyotera, in Kyotera District, located approximately 22 kilometres (14 mi), north-east of Rakai. Rakai is located about 48 kilometres (30 mi) north-west of the international border with Tanzania at Mutukula. and approximately 66.5 kilometres (41 mi)south-west of Masaka, the nearest large city. The town is approximately 199 kilometres (124 mi) south-west of Kampala, Uganda's capital and largest city. The coordinates of Rakai are 0°42'36.0"S, 31°24'18.0"E (Latitude:-0.7100, Longitude:31.4050).

== Population ==
The 2002 national census put the population of the town at about 5,920. In 2010, the Uganda Bureau of Statistics (UBOS) estimated the mid-year population at 6,900. In 2011, UBOS estimated the mid-year population at 7,000. During the national population census conducted on 27 August 2014, the population was enumerated at 7,592.

In 2015, UBOS estimated the population of Rakai Town at 7,500. In 2020, the population agency estimated the mid-year population of the town at 8,500. UBOS calculated the annual growth rate of the town's population to average 2.53 percent, between 2015 and 2020.

Historical population
Year	Pop.	±%
2002	5,920	—
2010	6,900	+16.6%
2011	7,000	+1.4%
2014	7,592	+8.5%
2015	7,500	−1.2%
2020	8,500	+13.3%

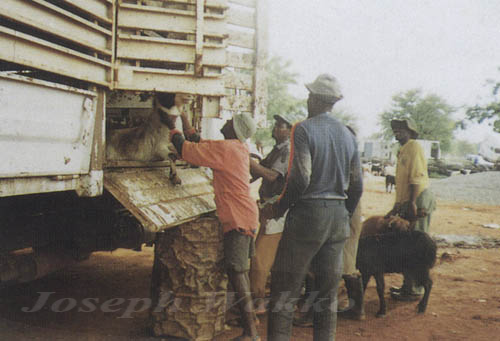
Animal Transportation in Rakai District South Western Uganda.

== Overview ==
Rakai is the headquarters of Rakai District, which in the early 1980s, was the epicenter and first district in Uganda to be affected by the AIDS epidemic.

== Points of interest ==
The following additional points of interest are located within the town limits or close to its edges: (a) the offices of Rakai Town Council. (b) Rakai General Hospital, a 100-bed public hospital administered by the Rakai District local government. (c) Kamuswaga's Palace. (d) the offices of Rakai District Headquarters. (e) Rakai Health Sciences Program, a collaboration between researchers at Makerere University, Columbia University, and Johns Hopkins University, offering several different health services such as antiretroviral medications, circumcision, health education, and counseling as well as research in the field of HIV/AIDS.

== Law enforcement ==
There is a police station in Rakai Town, administered and operated by the Uganda Police Force.

== See also ==
- Kyotera
- Kalisizo
- Kakuuto
- Mutukula, Uganda
