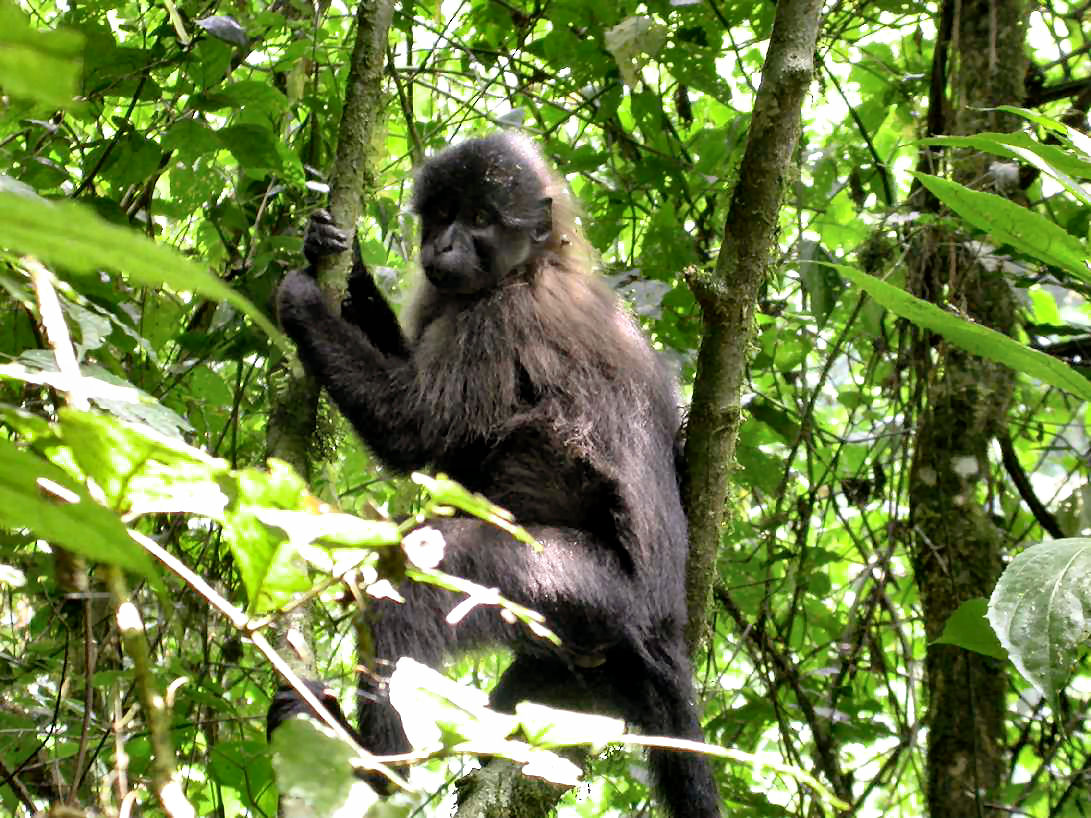
- Juvenile

Conservation status
- Vulnerable (IUCN 3.1)

Scientific classification
- Kingdom: Animalia
- Phylum: Chordata
- Class: Mammalia
- Order: Primates
- Family: Cercopithecidae
- Genus: Lophocebus
- Species: L. albigena
- Subspecies: L. a. ugandae

Trinomial name
- Lophocebus albigena ugandae (Matschie, 1912)

= Uganda mangabey =

Subspecies of mammal

The Uganda mangabey (Lophocebus albigena ugandae) is a subspecies of the grey-cheeked mangabey (L. albigena), an Old World monkey, found only in Uganda and in the Minziro Forest Reserve, just over the border in Tanzania. Colin Groves upgraded the Ugandan population of this crested mangabey to the new species L. ugandae on 16 February 2007, but this is not widely accepted. This subspecies is significantly smaller than the other subspecies of grey-cheeked mangabey, with a shorter skull and smaller face. 2018 was the most recent year in which the International Union for Conservation of Nature assessed the conservation status of L. albigena ugandae, describing it as being of vulnerable.

== Taxonomy ==
In 1978, Colin Groves recognized three subspecies of Lophocebus albigena, namely L. a. albigena; L. a. johnstoni; and L. a. osmani. Three decades later, in 2007, he raised these subspecies to full species rank on phylogenetic grounds, at the same time recognising that the mangabeys present in Uganda were sufficiently different from the remainder of L. albigena as to constitute a separate species, which he named L. ugandae. The IUCN continues to list these all as subspecies.

== Description ==
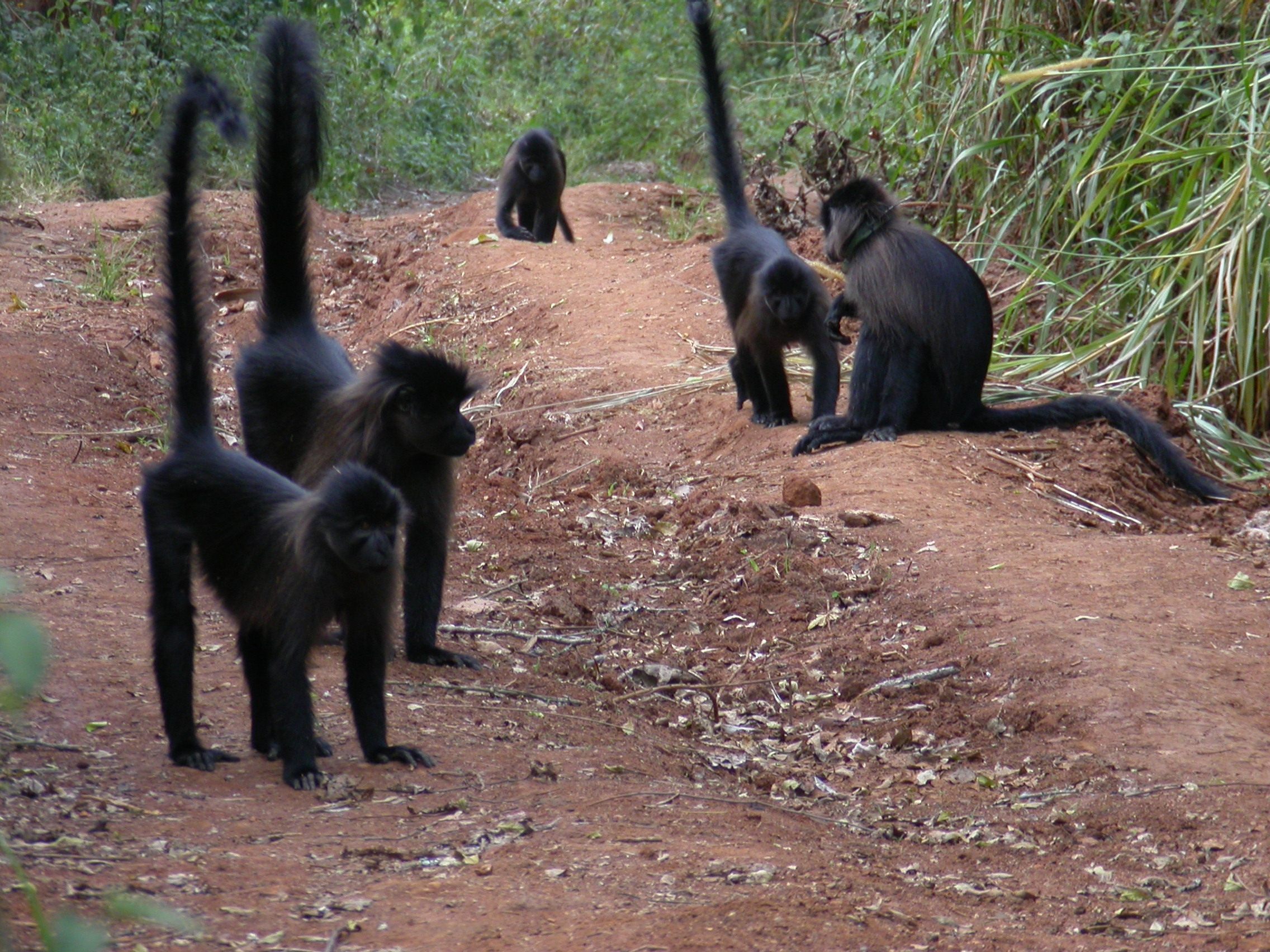
The Uganda mangabey comes to the ground to cross roads, forage and socialise.

The Uganda mangabey is rather smaller than the grey-cheeked mangabey (L. albigena). It is less sexually dimorphic and has a smaller skull. Individuals from the east of Uganda have a yellowish-brown colour while those from the west are a slightly darker greyish-brown. The mane and breast are pale chocolate-brown and contrast more with the body colour than do the equivalent parts of the Johnston's mangabey (Lophocebus johnstoni).

== Distribution and habitat ==
The Uganda mangabey is known from the forests on the north and northwestern sides of Lake Victoria, including the Mabira Forest, from which it was first described, the Bujuko Forest, the Bukasa Forest, and the vicinity of Sango Bay. It also occurs near Kibaale, to the east of the Albertine Rift Valley. It occurs in both primary and secondary forests, and is an arboreal species, spending most of its time in the upper canopy, where it forages for fruits and seeds; favoured food items include the fruits of the false nutmeg and of the breadfruit, the fruits and seeds of Erythrophleum spp., the fruits of the date palm and the fruits of the oil palm.

== Conservation ==
One of the largest populations of Uganda mangabey is in the Mabira Central Forest Reserve. This protected area is being illegally logged and parts are being converted to agricultural use. Attempts are being made to habituate several groups of mangabey to the presence of humans with a view to increasing wildlife tourism in the area as a means to discourage habitat destruction and provide an extra source of income for the local community.
