= Sango Bay =

Ugandan settlement

- Location in Uganda
- Coordinates: 00°53′38″S 31°43′22″E
- Country: Uganda
- Region: Central Uganda
- District: Kyotera District
- Elevation: 3,757 ft (1,145 m)

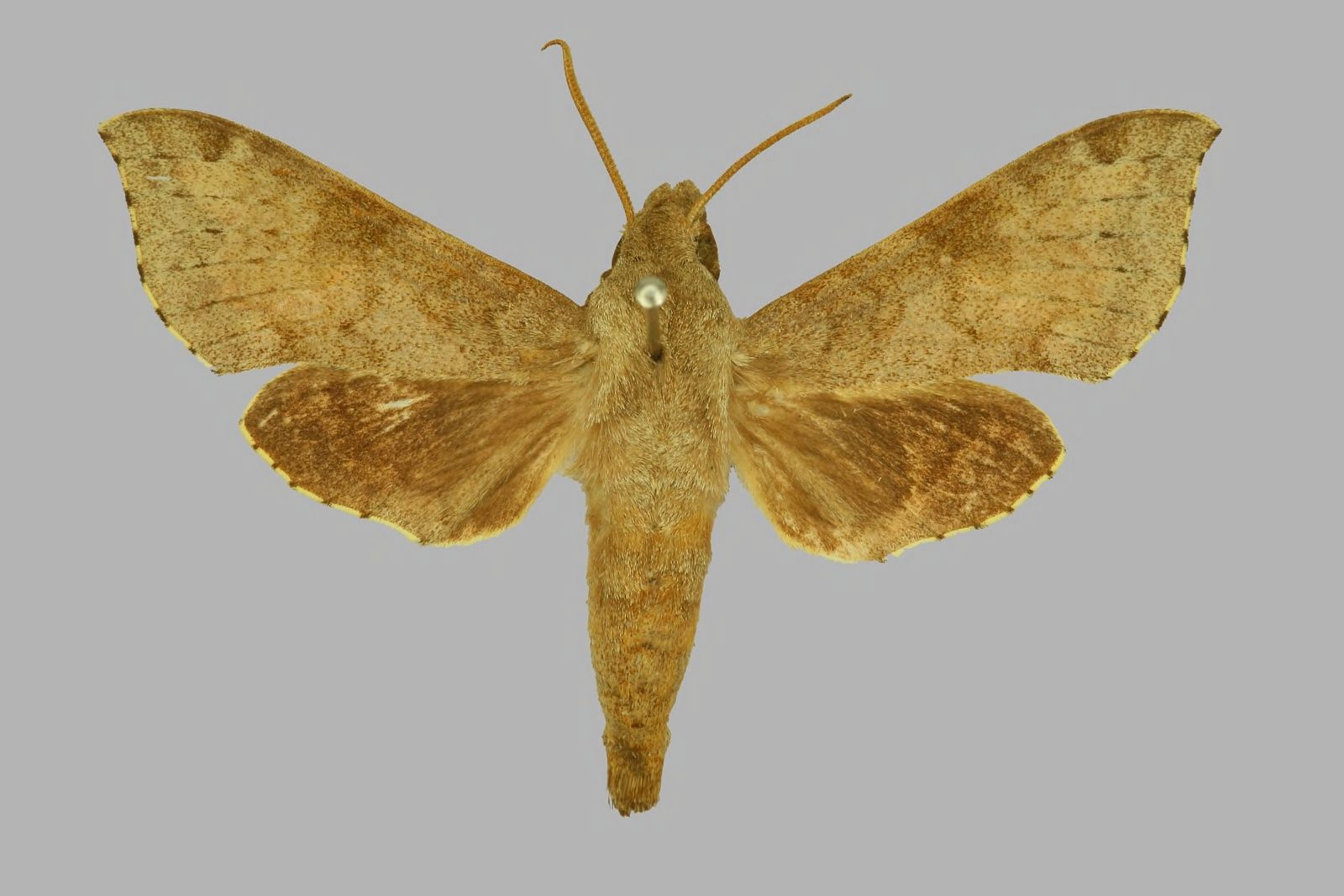
A male Temnora griseata found at Sango Bay in Kyotera Masaka

Sango Bay is a settlement in the southern part of the Central Region of Uganda.

== Location ==
Sango Bay is located in Sango Bay Parish, Kakuuto Sub-County, Kyotera District, in the Buganda Region of Uganda. This is approximately 56.5 kilometres (35 mi), by road, south-east of Kyotera, where the district headquarters are located. Sango Bay is located approximately 57 kilometres (35 mi), by road, north-east of the town of Mutukula, Uganda, at the international border with Tanzania. The geographical coordinates of Sango Bay are:00°53'38.0"S, 31°43'22.0"E (Latitude:-0.893889; Longitude:31.722778). Sango Bay lies at an average elevation of 1,145 metres (3,757 ft) above sea level.

== Overview ==
Sango Bay is a fishing village, with Lake Nalubaale within walking distance to the east of Sango Bay. The area where the settlement is located is known as Sango Bay Conservation Area, bordered by the Tanzanian border to the south, Lake Nalubaale to the east, the Masaka–Mutukula Road to the west and Lake Nabugabo Conservation Area to the north.

The vegetation is characterised by wetlands, grasslands and forests. Over 300,000 Chlidonias leucopterus have been recorded in the area, as late as 1994. Ardeola ralloides, Pelecanus onocrotalus, Pelecanus rufescens and Hirundo atrocaerulea have been observed in the area.

This area was also the location of the Sango Bay Resettlement Camp. The camp was established in 2013, to accommodate over 5,000 people expelled from Tanzania for illegal entry by the then president, Jakaya Kikwete. They included Ugandans, Rwandese, Congolese, Burundians, and stateless people. As of June 2016, the camp had been emptied and the refugees relocated to other camps in Uganda.

The Sango Bay area is also the location of Sango Bay Estates Limited, a sugar manufacturer established in 1930.

Jubilee Revival Church is in Sango Bay.

== See also ==
- Sugar production in Uganda
- List of sugar manufacturers in Uganda
