= Sango Bay Estates Limited =

Sugar manufacturer in Uganda

Coordinates: 01°38′08″N 31°36′20″E

- Company type: Private
- Industry: Manufacture & Marketing of Sugar
- Founded: 1930
- Headquarters: Sango Bay, Kakuuto, Uganda
- Key people: Sharad Patel; Managing Director
- Products: Sugar

Sango Bay Estates Limited is a sugar manufacturer in Uganda, the third-largest economy in the East African Community.

== Overview ==
Sango Bay Estates sits on approximately 250 square miles (650 km^{2}) (65,000 hectares) of land. As of July 2014, it is the fifth-largest manufacturer of sugar in Uganda, producing an estimated 20,000 metric tonnes annually in 2014, accounting for approximately 5% of national output. Kakira Sugar Works, located in Kakira, Jinja District, is the nation's largest sugar producer, accounting for approximately 41% of national output. Kinyara Sugar Works, in Kinyara, Masindi District, is the second-largest producer of sugar in the country, accounting for about 29% of national output. Sugar Corporation of Uganda Limited, located in Lugazi, Buikwe District, produces approximately 12% of total national sugar output. The Sugar & Allied Industries Limited in Kaliro District, accounts for about 9% of national output. The remaining 4% or so is produced by small, newly licensed companies whose individual production data is not yet publicly available. The estimated 442,500 metric tonnes of sugar produced by the four leading sugar manufacturers in Uganda is marketed to the Eastern African countries of Burundi, Democratic Republic of the Congo, Kenya, Rwanda, South Sudan, Tanzania and Uganda.

== Location ==
Sango Bay Estates Limited is located in the Sango Bay area, Kakuuto County, Rakai District, Central Uganda, near the town of Kakuuto, close to the International border with the Republic of Tanzania. This location is approximately 200 kilometres (124 mi), by road, southwest of Kampala, the capital of Uganda and the largest city in that country. The estimated coordinates of Sango Bay Estates are:0°54'37.0"S, 31°29'06.0"E (Latitude:-0.910278; Longitude:31.485000).

== History ==
The sugar estate was founded in 1930. By the early 1970s, a respectable sugar industry had been established. In the 1972 dictator Idi Amin expelled the owners, who are of Asian descent. The factory and estate were mismanaged into near extinction. The remaining infrastructure was looted during the Tanzania-Uganda War that removed Idi Amin from power in 1979. In the 1990s the owners reclaimed the estate and non-functioning factory. A rehabilitation plan worth US$10 million was developed to renovate both the plantation and the factory. Production started in 2011 and annual output is projected at 15,000 metric tonnes. When fully operational Sango Bay can produce 60,000 metric tonnes of sugar annually.

== Ownership ==
Sango Bay Sugar Estates Limited is a privately owned company. The detailed shareholding in the business is not publicly known at this time.

== Memberships ==
Sango Bay Estates is a member of the Uganda Sugar Manufacturers Association, an industry group of leading sugar manufacturers in the county.

== See also ==
- Rakai
- Kakuuto
- Rakai District
- Uganda Economy
- Uganda Sugar Factories
