= Adonia Ayebare =

Ugandan journalist and diplomat

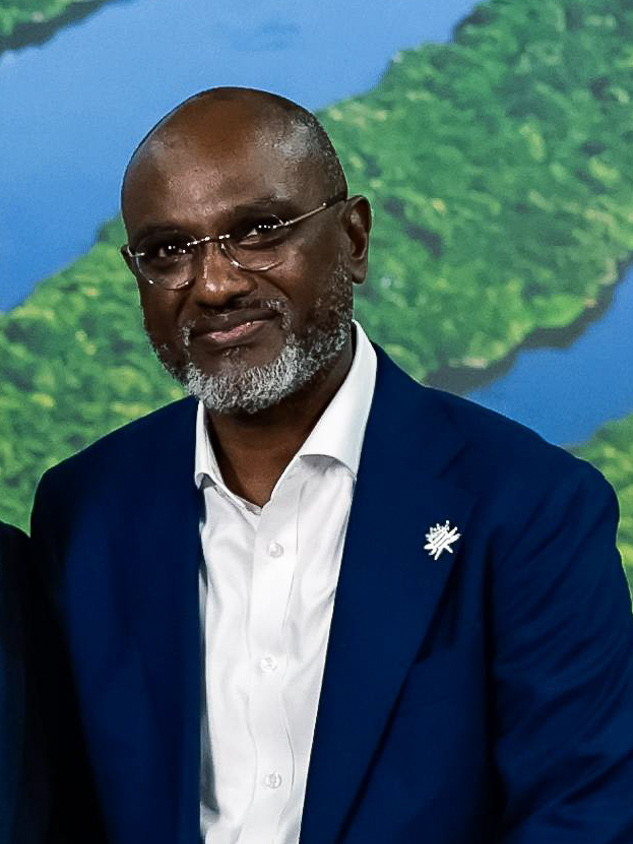
- Adonia Ayebare at the 2025 United Nations Climate Change Conference

Minister of Foreign Affairs
- Incumbent
- Assumed office 11 August 2026
- President: Yoweri Museveni
- Preceded by: Jeje Odongo; Haruna Kasolo Kyeyune (acting)

Permanent Representative of Uganda to the United Nations
- In office 2017–2026
- Preceded by: Richard Nduhura
- Succeeded by: Godfrey Kwoba (acting)
- Acting
- In office 2010–2012
- Preceded by: Ruhakana Rugunda
- Succeeded by: Richard Nduhura

Ambassador of Uganda to Rwanda and Burundi
- In office 2002–2005
- Succeeded by: Richard Kabonero

Personal details
- Born: 18 October 1966 (age 59)
- Education: Makerere University (BA in Mass Communications); Long Island University (Master of Arts); Fletcher School of Law and Diplomacy (Master of Arts); Indiana University (Doctor of Philosophy); Rutgers University (Doctor of Philosophy); Kennedy School of Government (Certificate in International Security)
- Occupation: Journalist, diplomat

Adonia Ayebare (born 18 October 1966) is a Ugandan journalist and diplomat who currently serves as Uganda's minister of foreign affairs since August 2026. He previously served as the country's permanent representative to the United Nations from 2017 to 2026, and from January 2013 until March 2017 as the senior adviser for peace and security at the African Union's permanent observer mission to the United Nations in New York City.

== Early life, education, and journalism career ==
Born on 18 October 1966, Adonia received his bachelor of arts in mass communication from the Makerere University in 1993. Adonia acquired two master of arts degrees from Long Island University and the Tufts University's Fletcher School of Law and Diplomacy and two doctorate from Indiana University and Rutgers University in the United States.

== Career ==
=== Journalism career ===
Adonia began his career in journalism as a reporter for Uganda Confidential, an independent investigative publication owned by Teddy Ssezi Cheeye, who personally attended presidential press conferences. He then moved for Market Place, a now-defunct newspaper whose headquarters in Entebbe was located in proximity with the Presidential State House, as an editor. It was during this period where he began to be noticed by president Yoweri Museveni by asking questions during presidential press conferences.

He left Market Place to work for the Nairobi-based East African Business Week from 1996 to 1998, where he reported on political and military developments of East African Community countries amidst the ousting of Zairean (now DR Congo) dictator Mobutu Sese Seko. Adonia then worked as an information officer with the Integrated Regional Information Network (IRIN) between 1998 and 2000.

=== Diplomatic career ===
Adonia's role in diplomacy began with his assignment at Uganda's embassy in Kigali, Rwanda with the diplomatic rank of first secretary in 1998. Following a brief tenure there, he was sent to New York, where he took up duties in Uganda's permanent mission to the United Nations with the same diplomatic rank. When the United Nations Security Council proposed sanctions towards Salim Saleh, Uganda's presidential adviser, for his alleged role in illegal mining in the Democratic Republic of the Congo, Salim transmitted his bank statements to Adonia for it to be sent to the UNSC for considerations.

In 2001, he was named as Uganda's principal adviser and special envoy to the Burundi peace process, leading Uganda's delegation in negotiating and implementing the Arusha Accords that ended the Burundian Civil War. Throughout the negotiations, Adonia worked closely with the lead mediator, the-then South African vice-president, Jacob Zuma, Tanzanian mediators, as well as Burundian president Pierre Nkurunziza and other local stakeholders.

=== Ambassador to Rwanda ===
In October 2002, Adonia accompanied president Yoweri Museveni in talks with Rwandan president Paul Kagame and mediated by the U.K. Secretary of State for International Development Clare Short, where the presidents discussed the presence of opposition officers in each other country. It was later agreed that the officers with disagreements with their home government would be relocated to another country. Shortly after the negotiations concluded, Adonia was named as ambassador to Rwanda and Burundi, with residence in Kigali, after his name had circulated for months prior to his official appointment. He presented his credentials to president Domitien Ndayizeye of Burundi on 13 April 2005. His tenure was marked with efforts to improve bilateral ties through minister-level and security chief meetings and the reassignment of several Ugandan embassy diplomats who was accused by the Rwandan for spying government establishments.

During President Museveni's presence for the 10th Common Market for Eastern and Southern Africa (COMESA) meeting in Kigali, his entourage was apprehended and searched for hours at the border crossing by Rwandan authorities due to concerns regarding the convoy's size. Adonia himself was accused of smuggling weapons to Rwanda, with Rwandan Director of Information Joseph Bideri stating the alleged presence of weapons cache in his vehicle. Museveni's entourage was eventually allowed to enter after lobbying by Adonia and other Ugandan diplomats.

=== Multilateral role ===
Adonia was named as the deputy permanent representative of Uganda to the United Nations sometime between late 2005 and early 2006, becoming the second-in-command of permanent representative Francis K. Butagira. At the time of his appointment, the Daily Monitor newspaper described him as one of Uganda's youngest top diplomats. During this period, Adonia represented Uganda in the UN's peacebuilding commission debates.

In December 2008, Adonia was slated for assignment in Addis Ababa, although the plan was summarily abandoned as Adonia was still pursuing his doctorate in New York. He remained in New York instead, being appointed to the International Peace Institute as its acting director of the Africa Program, with responsibilities on implementing agreement between the institute and the African Union, in July 2009.

He returned to his old job as the deputy permanent representative to the United Nations in 2010, and immediately assumed duties as the mission's chargé d'affaires in the absence of a permanent representative. In early 2012, Adonia and his Lithuanian counterpart Dalius Čekuolis signed a joint communique establishing diplomatic relations between the two nations. Adonia left his posting in New York in November 2012 following the appointment of Richard Nduhura as permanent representative.

After his New York stint, he took up posting as advisor for peace and security to the Chairperson of the African Union Commission, Nkosazana Dlamini-Zuma for one year, before being appointed to lead the African section at the Commonwealth of Nations headquarters in the Marlborough House in 2013. On the same year, Adonia became the senior adviser for peacebuilding and security to African Union's observing mission in New York, serving from January 2013 to March 2017.

=== Uganda's PR to the United Nations ===
In January 2017, president Museveni nominated Adonia as permanent representative to the United Nations. He was officially confirmed in March upon passing parliamentary vetting in February, and presented his credentials to Secretary-General of the United Nations António Guterres on 3 May 2017.

In 2021, Museveni assigned Adonia the responsibility of mending the strained relations between Uganda and Rwanda, raising the ire of Uganda's ambassador to Rwanda Richard Kabonero. In what was later leaked from their conversation in a WhatsApp group, Kabonero accused Adonia of undermining his authority within his jurisdiction, to which Adonia replied by emphasizing his assigned role as the president's special envoy for the issue and his seniority in the diplomatic service.

During Uganda's chairmanship of the Non-Aligned Movement (NAM) in 2024, Adonia coordinated the NAM's United Nations engagement and aligning Uganda's foreign policy with NAM's goal during its summit in Kampala.

In April 2025, Adonia's post was elevated to cabinet rank, granting him direct access to president Museveni despite lacking voting rights in the cabinet. He was sworn in as an ex-officio cabinet member by vice president Jessica Alupo on 27 April.

=== Foreign minister ===
On 26 May 2026, president Museveni nominated Adonia as foreign minister, replacing his predecessor Jeje Odongo who was ousted for "criticism over diplomatic missteps and internal controversies" and "public scrutiny over the conduct of some missions abroad". Adonia's nomination for the cabinet was stalled due to his dual nationality, as he had been granted U.S. citizenship on 23 April 2025, and that Uganda does not allow people with dual citizenship to hold senior public offices. As Adonia was not sworn in along with other cabinet nominees of the same period, Haruna Kasolo Kyeyune was appointed to fill in the cabinet vacancy as acting foreign minister on 22 June 2026. Adonia was finally sworn in on 11 August 2026 after relinquishing his U.S. citizenship.

== Personal life ==
Adonia Ayebare is married to Dorah Ayebare and has five children.
