= Haruna Kasolo Kyeyune =

Ugandan politician

Hon. Haruna Kasolo Kyeyune

Minister of Foreign Affairs
- Acting
- In office 22 June 2026 – 11 August 2026
- President: Yoweri Museveni
- Preceded by: Jeje Odongo
- Succeeded by: Adonia Ayebare

Personal details
- Born: August 24, 1979 (age 47)
- Party: National Resistance Movement

Haruna Kasolo Kyeyune is a Ugandan politician serving as the Minister of State for Foreign Affairs (Regional Co-operation). He was the State Minister for Microfinance in the Ugandan Cabinet. He was appointed to that position on 6 June 2016. He concurrently served as the elected parliamentary representative for Kyotera County, Kyotera District, in the 10th Ugandan Parliament (2016–2021). Following the general elections in Uganda in 2021, John Paul Mpalanyi Lukwago, a member of the Democratic Party (DP), succeeded him in parliament.

== Personal life ==
Parliament records list Kyeyune as born on 24 August 1979 and is married.

== Political career ==
=== Parliament ===
Kyeyune served as the directly elected Member of Parliament since 2011 for Kyotera County in Rakai District after the 2016 general elections, running on the National Resistance Movement ticket.

In the 2021 general elections, Kyeyune contested again for Kyotera County on the National Resistance Movement ticket and lost to John Paul Lukwago Mpalanyi of the Democratic Party, according to Electoral Commission results.

Parliament records list Kyeyune as an ex officio member in the 11th Parliament, due to Cabinet office.

=== Cabinet ===
On 6 June 2016, President Yoweri Museveni appointed Kyeyune as Minister of State for Microfinance (Ministry of Finance, Planning and Economic Development).

State House and Parliament lists Kyeyune as Minister of State for Finance, Planning and Economic Development (Microfinance).

In parliamentary proceedings, Kyeyune has tabled statements in the House in the ministerial role. In 2026, he was appointed as Minister of State for Foreign Affairs (Regional cooperation) and assumed office on June 11, 2026 replacing John Mulimba.

=== Elections ===
In June 2022, Kyeyune announced plans to contest the Bukoto Central parliamentary seat in the 2026 elections, according to press reporting.

== See also ==
- Cabinet of Uganda
- Parliament of Uganda
