= Pacific Hills Christian School =

- Dural, Hills Shire, Sydney, New South Wales; Australia

Information
- Former names: Pennant Hills Christian School
- Type: Independent co-educational early learning, primary and secondary day school
- Motto: Wisdom and Knowledge in Christ
- Denomination: Non-denominational Christian
- Established: 1979; 47 years ago
- Sister school: Bethlehem College; Middleton Grange School; Pacific Academy
- Educational authority: NSW Department of Education
- Principal: Edwin J. Boyce OAM
- Grades: Early learning and K–12
- Enrolment: 1,285 (2006)
- Colours: Green and white
- Website: www.pacifichills.nsw.edu.au/phcs

The Pacific Hills Christian School is an independent, non-denominational Christian, co-educational, early learning, primary, and secondary day school, located in the suburb of Dural, in the Hills District of Sydney, New South Wales, Australia.

The school caters for approximately 1,500 students from early learning to Year 12 and is divided into three sections: Junior School, Middle School, and Senior School.

The principal of the Pacific Hills Christian School is Edwin J. Boyce OAM, who has led the school since 1985.

== History ==
Pacific Hills Christian School can trace its origins back to the early 1970s, when it was first established as the Pennant Hills Christian School, with just eight students and one teacher, Lynn McCrindle. At this time the school was located in two rooms of Lutanda Children's Home, an orphanage at Pennant Hills.

By 1980, enrolments had grown to 41 students with just two staff members. The following year saw the introduction of secondary education, and the first students with disabilities integrated into mainstream education. 1983 saw the appointment of the school's first principal, Ken Oliver. Boyce was appointed as principal in 1985.

In 1986, the school moved to its current location at Dural and subsequently changed its name to Pacific Hills Christian School. That year also saw the first year 12 class sit for the NSW Higher School Certificate.

Since its relocation, the school has purchased further land and constructed additional buildings and sporting facilities. Today the school is located on a 9-hectare (22-acre) campus.

== School houses ==
As with most Australian schools, the Pacific Hills Christian School utilises a house system. There are four houses which take the names of famous missionaries:

- Jim Elliot (Blue)
- Mary Slessor (Green)
- George Müller (Red)
- Amy Carmichael (Yellow)

== Sister schools ==
Pacific Hills currently has sister school links with the following schools:

- Bethlehem College, New Zealand
- Middleton Grange School, New Zealand
- Pacific Academy, Canada

== Notable alumni ==
- Kyah Simon – soccer player for Sydney FC

== See also ==
- List of non-government schools in New South Wales
