= Kakuuto, Uganda =

Kakuuto
- Location in Uganda
- Coordinates: 00°50′24″S 31°27′36″E
- Country: Uganda
- Region: Central Uganda
- District: Rakai District

Government
  - MP: Kaka Lubega Ismail Uthuman (National Resistance Movement)
- Elevation: 3,900 ft (1,200 m)

Kakuuto is a town in the Central region of Uganda.

== Location ==
Kakuuto is located in Kyotera District, approximately 80 kilometres (50 mi) south of Masaka, the largest city in the sub-region. This location lies immediately west of the highway between Masaka and the border town of Mutukula, at an elevation of 1,200 metres (3,900 ft), above sea level. Mutukula, the border town between Uganda and Tanzania, lies approximately 17 kilometres (11 mi), by road, south of Kakuuto. The coordinates of Kakuuto are:0°50'24.0"S, 31°27'36.0" (Latitude:-0.8400; Longitude:31.4600).

== Overview ==
Kakuuto is a small town in southern Kyotera District. It is the county seat of Kakuuto County. The surrounding area is primarily rural and poor. The population of the area has been greatly adversely affected by the HIV/AIDS epidemic over the past three decades. With the help of charities and NGO's, the town and region is slowly recovering.

== Points of interest ==
The following points of interest lie within the town or close to the town limits:

- The headquarters of Kakuuto County
- The offices of Kakuuto Town Council
- Kakuuto General Hospital - A 100-bed hospital, administered by the Uganda Ministry of Health
- Kakuuto Central Market
- Kakuuto Ostrich Farm - A private tourist attraction
- Sango Bay Estates Limited - Uganda's fourth-largest sugar manufacturer. Annual output of 15,000 metric tonnes in 2011.
- Sango Bay Forest Reserve
- St. Josephat Junior School - Kakuuto, a private primary school providing education services to children across the East African Region

== See also ==
- Mutukula
- Sango Bay Estates Limited
- Rakai District
- Central Region, Uganda
- St. Josephat Junior School - Kakuuto
