= Osman Hill's mangabey =

Conservation status
- Data Deficient (IUCN 3.1)

Scientific classification
- Kingdom: Animalia
- Phylum: Chordata
- Class: Mammalia
- Order: Primates
- Suborder: Haplorhini
- Infraorder: Simiiformes
- Family: Cercopithecidae
- Genus: Lophocebus
- Species: L. albigena
- Subspecies: L. a. osmani

Trinomial name
- Lophocebus albigena osmani Groves, 1978
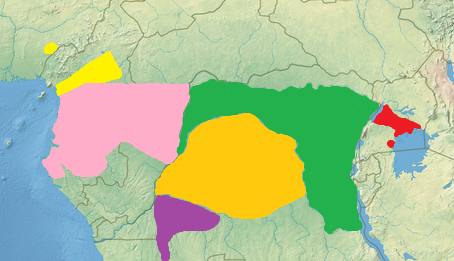
- Map showing range of Lophocebus species, L. osmani is shown in yellow

Subspecies of Old World monkey

The Osman Hill's mangabey (Lophocebus albigena osmani), also known as the rusty-mantled mangabey, is a subspecies of the grey-cheeked mangabey, a crested mangabey in the family Cercopithecidae, with a restricted distribution in West Africa.

== Description ==
Osman Hill's mangabey is a medium-sized lanky, arboreal, dark furred monkey. The sexes are similar in colour and markings but males are far larger than females, the size difference being especially marked in this subspecies compared to the other subspecies of the grey-cheeked mangabey. They have long, loose fur which is mainly blackish-brown, and a rufous tinged mane of longer hairs over the shoulders which is more noticeable in the males. The head shows a tuft on the crown and smaller tuft above the eyes, although these may not always be present, the cheeks are pale. The long tail is frequently held arched over the monkey's back. The two ischial callosities are bare and for a "C" shapes which are complete in the male but often broken in the females. The bare skin on such places as the palms and soles is pink in newborns but darkens as the get older and is normally black by nine months of age. A single male specimen has been measured and he had a head and body length of 610mm and a tail length of 920mm.

== Distribution ==
Osman Hill's mangabey has a very small range from the Cross River in south eastern Nigeria to the Batouri district of south eastern Cameroon.

== Habitat ==
Osman Hill's mangabey occurs in low to medium altitude tropical rainforest where it is highly arboreal and can be seen in the canopy and emergent layers. It is rarely observed on the ground or in secondary or savanna habitats. The highest densities are found in swamp forest and flooded forest.

== Habits ==
This subspecies and its close relatives have cheek pouches which they can use to store food to be eaten or processed later. The males have inflatable throat pouches which they use as resonators to amplify their loud low pitched calls which can be heard over a kilometre away from the calling male. They have powerful jaws, hands and arms which makes it possible for them to extract seeds from harder fruits, e.g. those of Monodora myristica than similarly sized monkeys. They are omnivorous, although fruit is the most important part of their diet, and they may locate fruiting trees by following the calls of frugivorous birds such as hornbills. Important fruit tree species for Odsman Hill's mangabey include Erythrophleum suaveolens and Enantia chlorantha. They also spend a lot of time splitting dead wood, excavating bark and searching through liana tangles and epiphyte masses searching for invertebrates.

Osman Hill's mangabey is a social subspecies living in groups of 10-20 individuals which consist of a few males, several females and their dependent young. These groups often associate with groups of other monkey species, and even occasionally with troops of chimpanzees. Contact calls are grunts, alarm calls are staccato barks and the males make a loud "whoop gobble" to co-ordinate the group and to set spaces between different groups. This call can be made by females but very infrequently. The groups are fluid and will mix but this can lead to increased aggression among the adults, although the young will play. Females in oestrus may attract additional males. The dominant male usually guards receptive females but she will try and mate with other males when she can.

== Taxonomy ==
Osman Hill's mangabey is a subspecies of the grey-cheeked mangabey, L. albigena.

== Etymology ==
Osman Hill's mangabey was named after William Charles Osman Hill, a primatologist, anthropologist, and anatomist from the 20th century.
