= Rakai General Hospital =

- Uganda Ministry of Health
- Location within Uganda

Geography
- Location: Rakai, Rakai District, Central Region, Uganda
- Coordinates: 00°42′19″S 31°24′09″E

Organisation
- Care system: Public
- Type: General

Services
- Emergency department: I
- Beds: 100

History
- Founded: 2000

Links
- Other links: Hospitals in Uganda

Rakai General Hospital, also known as Rakai District Hospital and Rakai Hospital, is a hospital in the Central Region of Uganda.

== Location ==
The hospital is located in the town of Rakai, in Rakai District, about 66 kilometres (41 mi) southwest of Masaka Regional Referral Hospital and about 122 kilometres (76 mi) southeast of Mbarara Regional Referral Hospital.

== Overview ==
Rakai General Hospital is a 100-bed government-owned hospital. Like most public hospitals in the country, it faces challenges of poor funding, under-staffing, poor pay and antiquated equipment.

== See also ==
- List of hospitals in Uganda
