= Lutaaya =

Lutaaya is a surname. Notable people with the surname include:

- Geoffrey Lutaaya, Ugandan musician, businessman and politician
- Philly Lutaaya (1951–1989) was a Ugandan musician
- Shakib Cham Lutaaya (born 1992), Ugandan entrepreneur, reality television personality
