= Kyaka =

Town in Tanzania

- Location in Tanzania
- Coordinates: 01°15′13″S 31°25′12″E
- Country: Tanzania
- Region: Kagera Region
- District: Missenyi District

Population (2015 Estimate)
  - Total: 6,000
- Time zone: UTC+3 (East Africa Time)
- Climate: Aw

Kyaka is a town in Tanzania. It is an urban centre in Missenyi District, Kagera Region. The population of Kyaka was estimated at 6,000 people in 2015.

== Location ==
Kyaka is located in Missenyi District, in Kagera Region, in northwestern Tanzania, on the southern banks of the Kagera River. This is approximately 53 kilometres (33 mi), by road, west of the city of Bukoba, where the Regional headquarters are located. Kyaka is approximately 30 kilometres (19 mi), by road, south of the town of Mutukula, Tanzania at the international border with Uganda. The geographical coordinates of Kyaka are:01°15'13.0"S, 31°25'12.0"E (Latitude:-1.253611; Longitude:31.420000). Kyaka sits at an average elevation of 1,180 metres (3,871 ft) above sea level.

== Overview ==
The Kyaka Bridge, sometimes referred to as Kagera Bridge, spans the Kagera River at Kyaka. At Kyaka, two major road systems intersect. Highway B8 (Mutukula–Bukoba Road) meets Highway B182 (Omurushaka–Kyaka Road).

== History ==
In October 1978, about 3,000 Uganda Army troops loyal to dictator Idi Amin invaded Tanzania, starting with aerial bombings. After overwhelming the weak Tanzanian border defenses, the Ugandans occupied the area north of Kagera River, called the Kagera Salient, claiming it was Ugandan territory. They blew up the Kyaka Bridge and destroyed a lot of property.

As result of the invasion, the Uganda–Tanzania War erupted; the Ugandans were mostly expelled by the Tanzania People's Defence Force from the Kagera Salient in November 1978. Following the conclusion of the war, the Tanzanian Government increased the strength of its police station in Kyaka to better ensure border security.

== See also ==
- Transport in Tanzania
- Uganda–Tanzania War
