= Kalisizo =

- Location in Uganda
- Coordinates: 00°32′06″S 31°37′21″E
- Country: Uganda
- Region: Central Uganda
- District: Kyotera District

Population (2014 Census)
  - Total: 31,439

Kalisizo is a town in the southern part of the Central Region of Uganda. Although it is the leading commercial center in Kyotera District, the administrative headquarters of the district are in Kasaali.

== Location ==
Kalisizo lies on the main highway between Masaka and the border town of Mutukula on Uganda's border with Tanzania. Kalisizo is located approximately 29 kilometres (18 mi), by road, southwest of Masaka, the nearest large city. Kalisizo is approximately 61 kilometres (38 mi), by road, north of Mutukula, the town at the international border with Tanzania. The coordinates of the town are:0°32'06.0"S, 31°37'21.0"E (Latitude:-0.5350; Longitude:31.6225).

== Population ==
In 2010, the Uganda Bureau of Statistics estimated the population of the town at 32,000, compared to 32,700 in 2011. In 2014 the National Census and Household Survey enumerated the population of Kalisizo at 31,439, with the urban population being 13,464, and the rural population being 17,975.

== Points of interest ==
The following points of interest lie within the town limits or close to the edges of town:

- The offices of Kalisizo Town Council
- The headquarters of Kalisizo Sub-county
- Kalisizo General Hospital - A 120-bed public hospital administered by the Uganda Ministry of Health
- Offices of The Rotary Club of Kalisizo - Club Number 59564.
- Christ the King Senior Secondary School
- Kalisizo central market
- The Masaka–Mutukula Road - The road passes through the middle of town in a north-south direction.
- Kalisizo Grade One Magistrate's Court.
- Kalisizo Police Station offices.
- Rakai Health Sciences Program (Rakai Project) head offices.

== See also ==
- Hospitals in Uganda
