= Kibaale Community Schools =

Christian schools in Uganda

The Kibaale Community Schools are Christian schools in the Rakai District of Uganda. They are now primarily funded and administered by the Pacific Academy Outreach Society (PAOS) which is part of the Pacific Academy, a Christian school in Surrey, British Columbia, Canada.

== History of the Kibaale community center & schools ==
They were originally started by Glad Tidings Church in Vancouver (a Pentecostal congregation), Canada and began its work in Uganda in 1960. Glad Tidings established a bible training centre and hundreds of community churches around this time period. However, during the tyrannical military dictatorship of Idi Amin, the economy collapsed, communication systems broke down, the cities and towns deteriorated and, in 1973, the church was driven underground. While the period was devastating and many people died, one of the positive experiences that came out of it was that the local people recognized that they had to provide their own leadership, carry out their own programs and not be dependent on outside leadership and resources.

The Gospel Mission to Uganda, which developed at this time, still feels a close kinship to their Canadian friends from Glad Tidings in Vancouver. In 1989 they approached Glad Tidings Church to participate with them in a program to help children whose parents had died of AIDS. Many children were desperately in need and had no one to look after them. The administrator of Glad Tidings, Rod Forrest, went to Uganda and spent some time in the Rakai District, met a number of local and government leaders and the Kibaale Children’s Centre was the founded afterwards. It has also a clinic for children. The centre had received assistance from agencies such as BC Save the Children’s Fund and Canadian International Development Agency as well as through the sponsorship program of World Vision. Glad Tidings also developed its own sponsorship program called International Child Care Fund (ICCF) which helped fund the program here for several years. There is now an ICCF (Netherlands) which sponsors some of the students in the school.

The Children’s Centre has also worked closely with the local Uganda government officials. In their concern for children to learn to cope with normal life in the village settings and to learn local languages and customs, they encouraged a resettlement program which now has those children who once lived on site integrated back into village homes in the surrounding areas. Although many are still being sponsored, they are being cared for in family homes by relatives or neighbors. The focus of the Children’s Centre has therefore shifted from working as an orphanage to helping with community development. To help with the development of education in the Kibaale area, Rod Forrest asked Ray Sutton of Pacific Academy to become involved.

In 1993 PAOS agreed to send two teachers, Arleen Buchholz (Dawson) and Evangeline Diaz (Delviken), to help with education in Kibaale. With their help the Kibaale Community School program was established, and together they worked to set up and then supervise an outreach program for Canadian students who wanted to gain experience in cross cultural ministry.

In mid-1993, Kibaale Community School began with about 150 students in four classes (Kindergarten to Primary 3). The next year a nursery class and Primary 4 class were added. In 1995 Primary 5 was added and the secondary school began with Senior 1. The 1996 school year ended with about 220 students in Nursery, Kindergarten, Primary 1 to 6, and Senior 1 and 2. By 1998 the school program extended to a full “ordinary level” secondary program and our first students graduated with secondary school certificates. A vocational program is also in place now, offering students a choice in either tailoring, baking or carpentry. These vocational students are young men and women who may not have had opportunity to attend academic classes or who are more suited to vocational work, and who need a practical trade to help support themselves and their families as soon as possible. As of year end 2008, the student population is approximately 850 students including the nursery school (N and K classes), primary school, secondary school and vocational school.

In the mid-1990s, the PAOS was established as a non-government charitable organization, and it is now fully responsible for the funding and administration of Kibaale Community Centre. This includes the schools, medical clinic, Kibaale Children’s Fund sponsorship office, community services department, and a farm. Donations to PAOS are channeled to Kibaale for the running of the programs. ICCF Holland sponsorship funds are also accepted into the PAOS office and sent directly to Kibaale.

== Recent developments ==
Teachers in Kibaale Community Schools as well as teachers from surrounding schools are receiving ongoing training and teacher development on a regular basis to improve their skills. Teacher development workshops are held on site during the week prior to school term opening three times per year. They also receive one-on-one coaching as Canadian staff are available to help in this area. Teaching staff have also been provided with student loans to allow them to upgrade their training at government teacher training colleges and universities during holiday times.

Recently some of their school graduates have come back to work at the centre; as teachers, lab technicians, community loans officers and farm managers.

On August 30, 2008 a new clinic for the popular Kibaale Children's Centre was opened by the wife of president Yoweri Museveni, Janet Museveni.
