= Mabira Forest =

Protected area in Uganda

- Mabira Central Forest Reserve
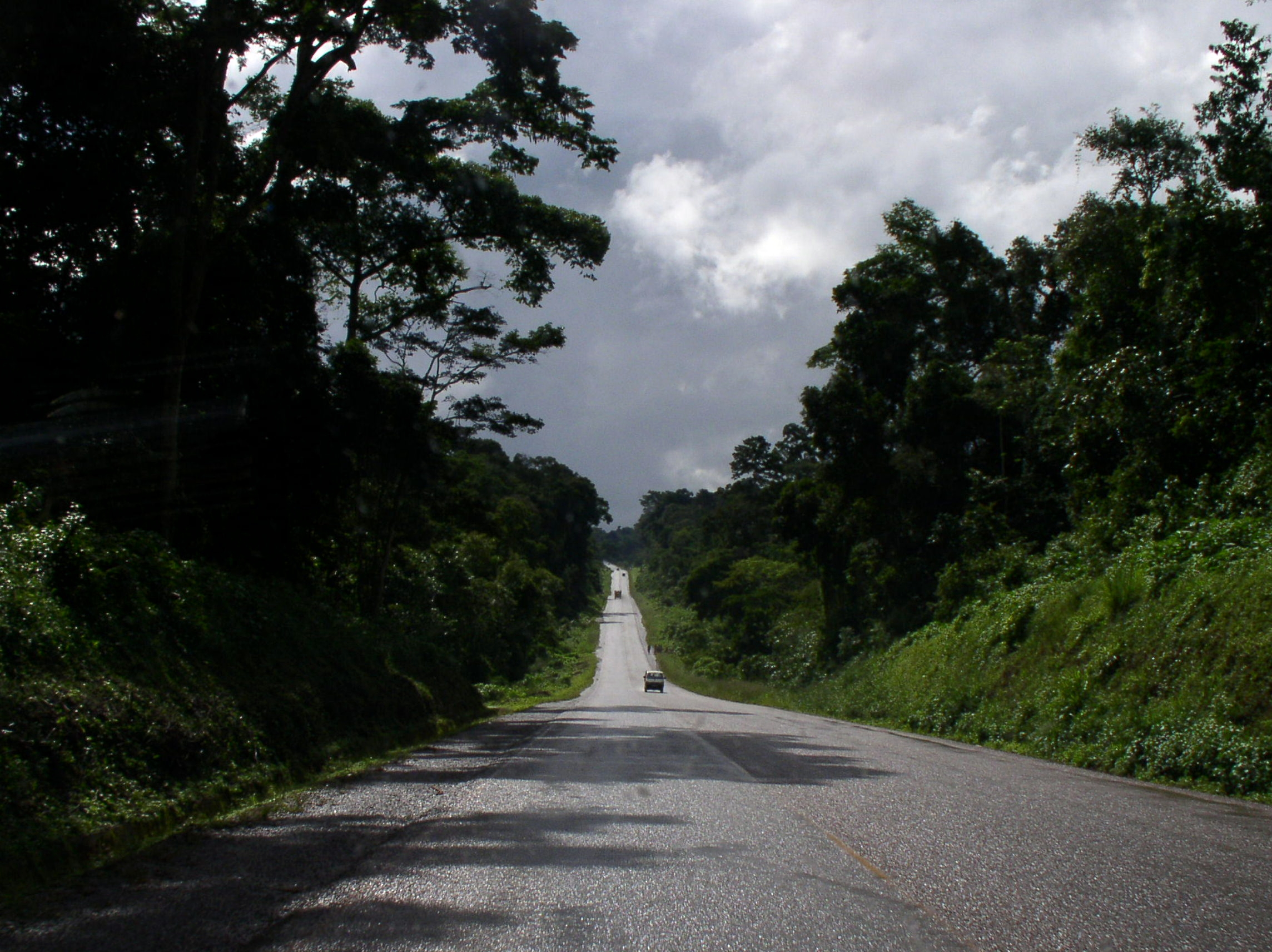

- Location within Uganda
- Location: Mukono District, Central Region, Uganda
- Nearest city: Lugazi
- Coordinates: 0°23′54″N 33°0′59″E
- Area: 300 km^{2} (120 sq mi)

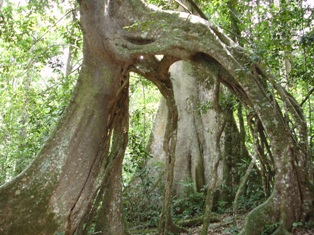
A tree root arch in Mabira forest

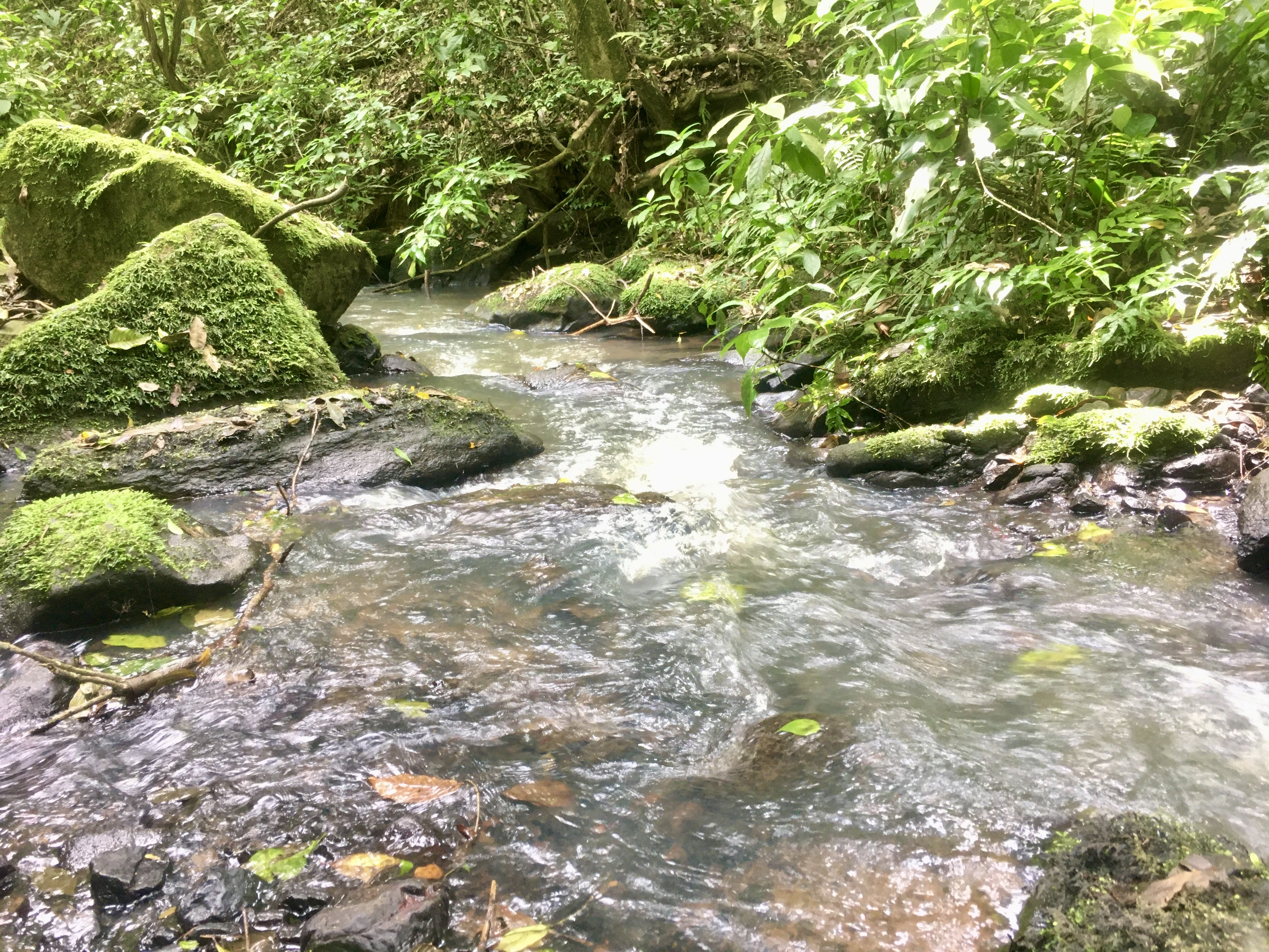
A water stream in the Secondary part of Mabira Forest Reserve

The Mabira Forest is a rainforest area covering about 300 square kilometres (120 mi^{2}) (30,000 hectares (74,000 acres)) in Uganda, located in Buikwe District, between Lugazi and Jinja. It has been protected as Mabira Forest Reserve since 1932. It is home for many endangered species like the primate Lophocebus ugandae.

== Geography ==
The Mabira central forest reserve lies north of Lake Victoria. The reserve covers an area of 30,038 ha. It lies on gently undulating country, with many flat-topped hills separated by wide stream valleys. Elevations range from 1070 to 1340 m above sea level. Although Lake Victoria lies close to the reserve's southern boundary, the forest is drained by streams that empty generally northward into the Victoria Nile.

The forest reserve is surrounded by agricultural areas. The reserve completely or partially surrounds approximately 27 settled enclaves.

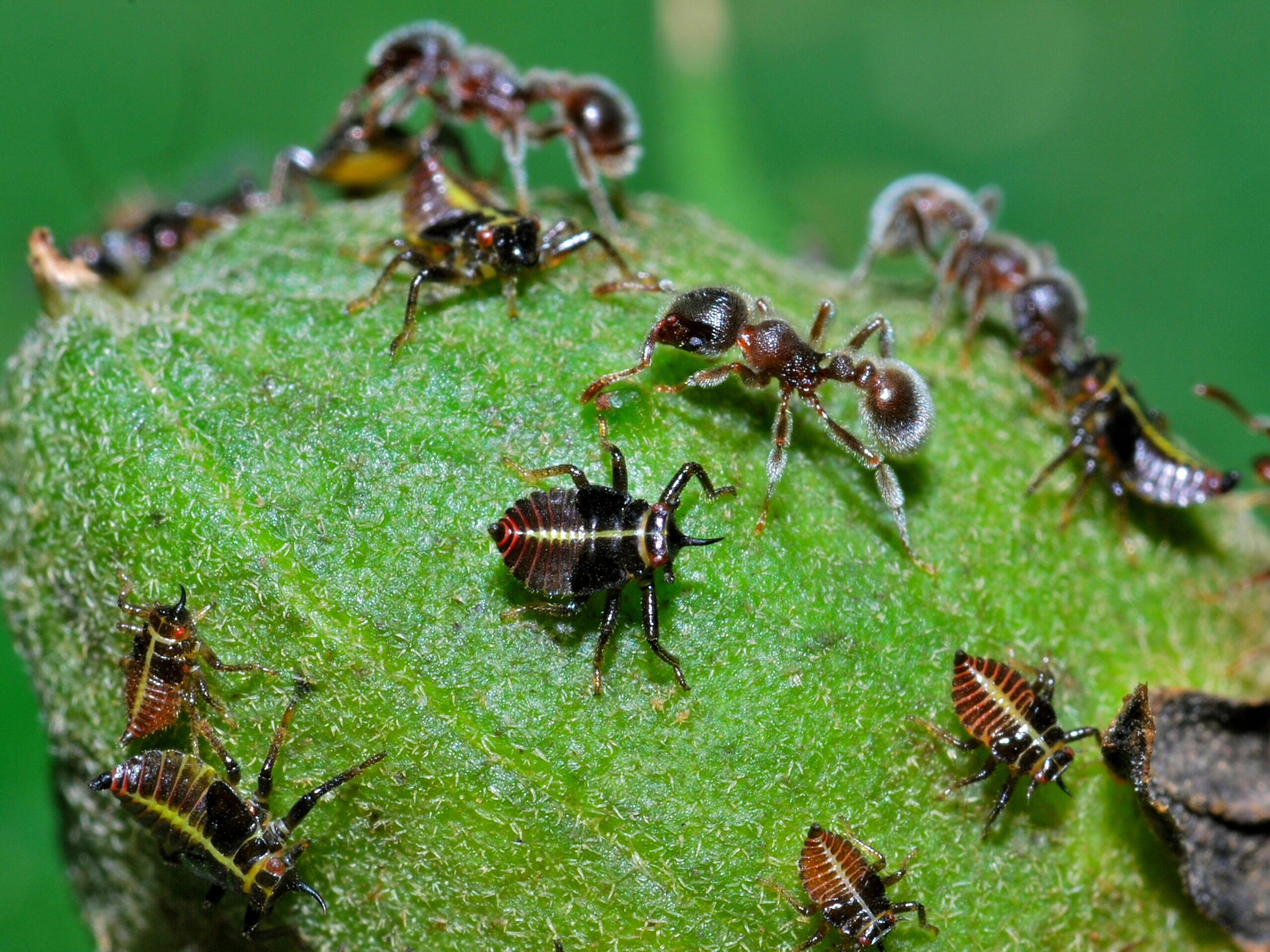

== Ecology ==
Mabira Forest is the largest remaining block of semi-evergreen rainforest in the Victoria Basin forest-savanna mosaic ecoregion. The reserve is secondary forest, and has been subject to long-term human influence. Logging began in the early 20th century, and the characteristic trees East African mahogany (Khaya anthotheca) and mvule (Milicia excelsa) that were present in the 1950s have been since mostly been cut down for their valuable timber. During the 1970s and 80s the government allowed banana and coffee plantations in the reserve.

The reserve is home to 315 species of birds, 312 species of trees, 218 butterfly species, 97 moth species, 23 small mammal species.

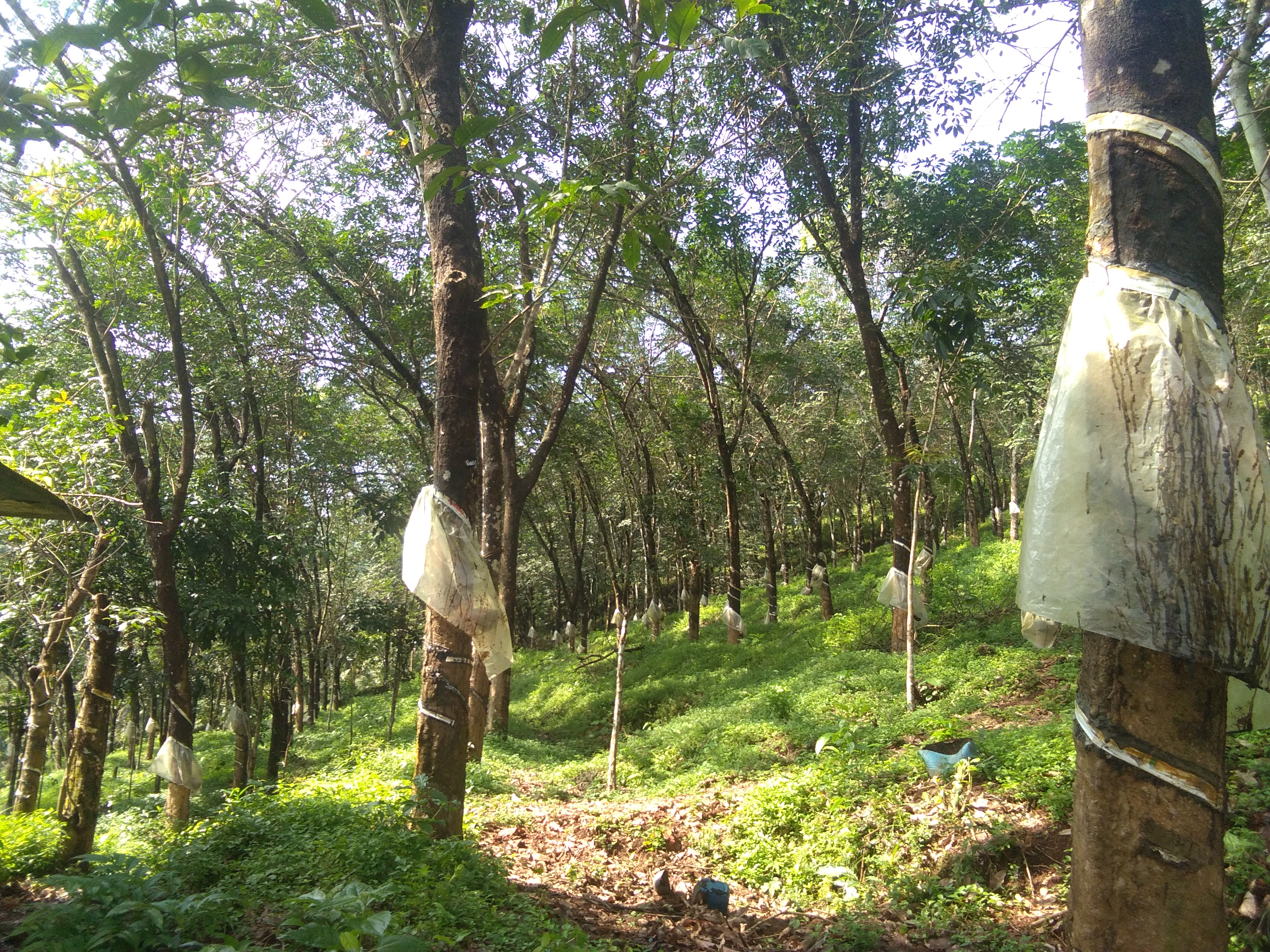
Rubber trees

== Mabira as a source of rubber ==
The Mabira forest was leased in 1900 by the East Africa and Uganda Exploration Company, who then set up the Mabira Forest (Uganda) Rubber Company to handle the concession. Their hopes of obtaining 500,000 lbs per annum from the forest proved unrealistic: the cost of clearing the dense forest around individual trees was too expensive, particularly on account of the poor yields which they got for each tree. As a result, the company moved from exploiting wild rubber to planting cultivated rubber, and also coffee.

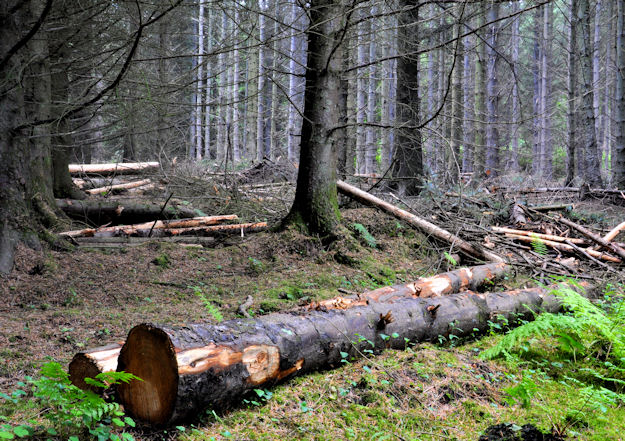
deforestation

== Deforestation plans ==
In 2007 the Sugar Corporation of Uganda Limited (SCOUL), a jointly owned by the Government of Uganda and by the Mehta Group, announced plans to clear one-third of the Mabira Forest (around 70 square kilometres (27 mi^{2}), for sugarcane plantations, and had proposed to the government to de-gazette this land and transfer it to SCOUL. President Yoweri Museveni and his cabinet supported this plan.

The deforestation plans were disputed within Uganda. While environmental activists feared the loss of hundreds of endangered species, increased erosion, the damage of livelihoods of local people and negative impacts on water balance and regional climate, supporters hoped for the creation of jobs. A cabinet paper said the plan would generate 3,500 jobs and contribute USh 11.5 billion to the treasury.

The kabaka (king) of Buganda opposed the deforestation plan and has offered alternative land for sugarcane production. The Anglican church of Mukono has also offered land.

At least three people were killed during a demonstration of about 1,000 for the protection of the Mabira Forest. There were also riots against Asians, since the Mehta Group is Indian-owned. SCOUL plantations were set on fire, and e-mails and SMS calling for the boycott of SCOUL's Lugazi sugar circulated.

President Museveni defended the deforestation plans, saying that he shall "not be deterred by people who don't see where the future of Africa lies". According to him, the Save Mabira activists "don't understand that the future of all countries lies in processing". In May 2007, the Ugandan environmental minister announced that the deforestation plans were suspended and that the government was trying to find alternative land for the Mehta Group.

== Tourism ==
Mabira Forest Reserve draws in visitors (nationals and foreigners) who are interested in its natural beauty and diverse flora and fauna. Some of the activities available to tourists include bird watching, wildlife viewing, guided nature walks, camping/picnics, cycling, tracking monkeys, zip-lining and cultural experiences with the local communities. Tourism is a source of revenue to the government and local community.

== Gallery ==
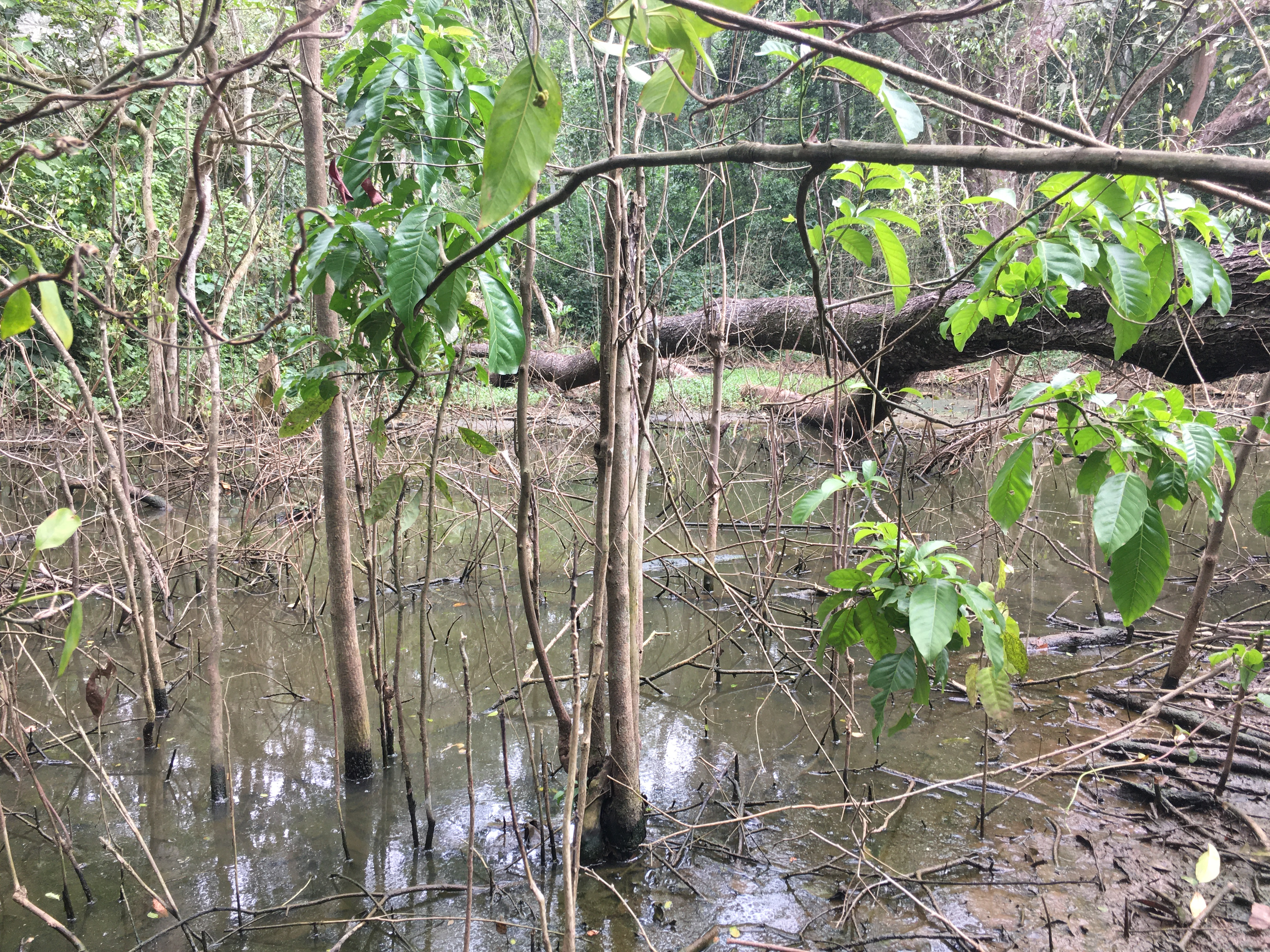
A stagnant water stream in Mabira Forest which was formed as a result of a bus blocking its flow. The bus accident that happened on Kampala-Jinja road in the past few years ago.

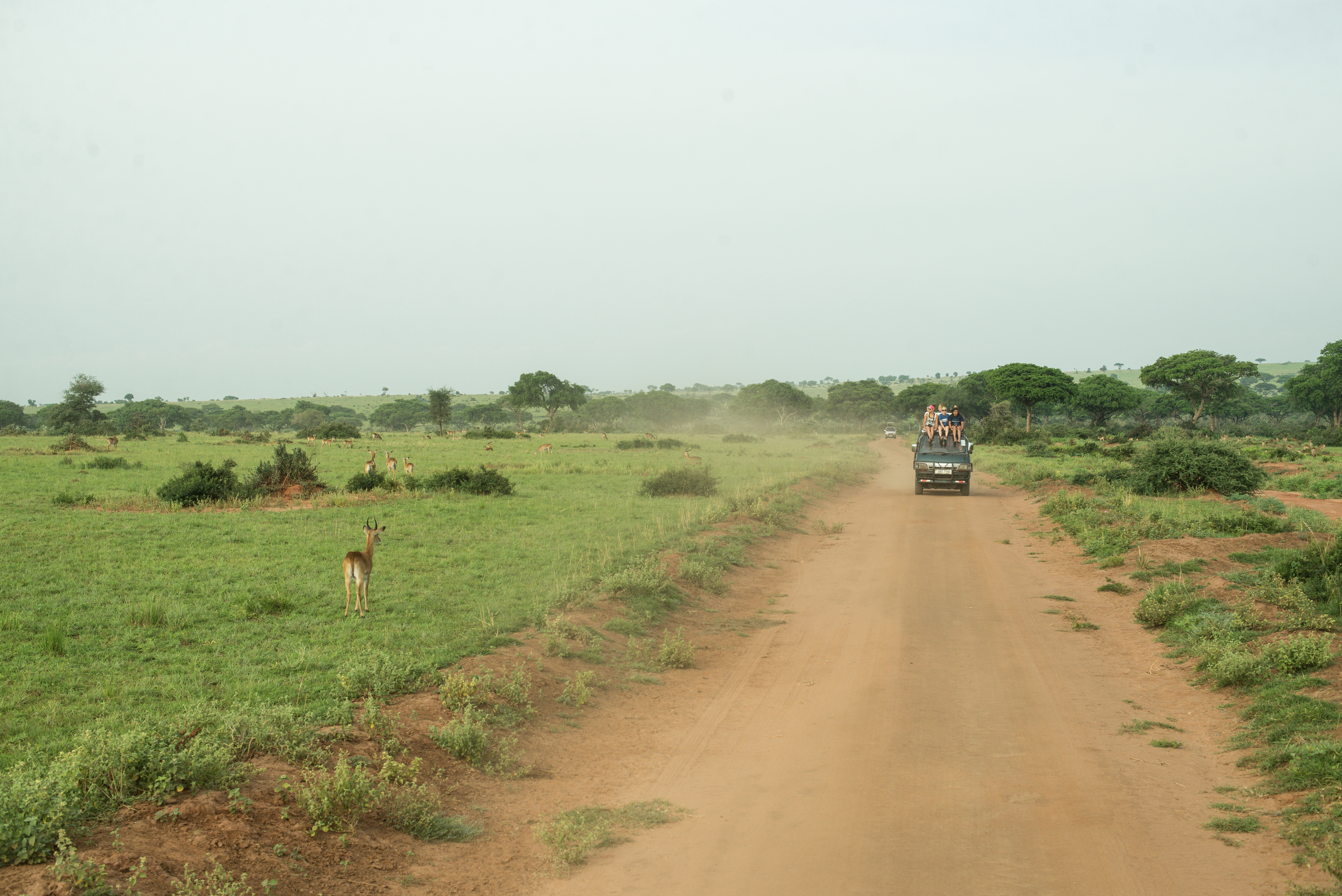
Tourism in Uganda

== See also ==
- Central Forest Reserves of Uganda
