= Mutukula Airport =

Airport in Uganda

- IATA: none; ICAO: none; LID: UG-0003

Summary
- Airport type: Civilian and military
- Owner: Civil Aviation Authority of Uganda
- Serves: Mutukula, Uganda
- Elevation AMSL: 3,820 ft / 1,164 m
- Coordinates: 0°55′30″S 31°27′00″E

Map
- Location of the airport in Uganda

Runways
Direction	Length		Surface
Direction	m	ft	Surface
07/25	2,600	8,530	Grass
- Source: Google Maps Fallingrain

Mutukula Airport is an airport serving the town of Mutukula in the Rakai District of the Central Region of Uganda.

The airport is on the Masaka-Kakuto road, 8 kilometres (5.0 mi) north of Mutukala, which straddles the Ugandan border with Tanzania. 2010 satellite imagery shows the runway obstructed with brush.

== See also ==
- Transport in Uganda
- List of airports in Uganda
- Civil Aviation Authority of Uganda
