= Richard Nduhura =

Ugandan politician

- Born: 17 February 1956 (age 70); Uganda
- Education: Makerere University (Bachelor of Veterinary Medicine)
- Occupations: Veterinarian, politician
- Years active: 1979–present
- Title: Uganda's Permanent Representative to the United Nations

Richard Nduhura, sometimes spelled Richard Nduhuura, is a Ugandan politician, diplomat and veterinarian who currently serves as Uganda's Permanent Representative to the United Nations. He was appointed to that position in August 2012. Prior to that, he served as State Minister for Health (General Duties) in the Ugandan Cabinet. He was appointed to that position on 1 June 2006. In the cabinet reshuffle of 16 February 2009, and that of 27 May 2011, he retained his cabinet post.

== Background and education ==
He was born in Bushenyi District, on 17 February 1956. Nduhura holds the degree of Bachelor of Veterinary Medicine (BVM), from Makerere University, Uganda's oldest university.

== Work experience ==
In 1979, he started practice as a Veterinary Officer and continued to practice until 1989. In 1988, he was elected General Secretary of Bushenyi District Local Council (LC-V), serving in that capacity until 1989. Between 1998 and 2001, he served as the Chairperson of the Bushenyi District Service Commission. In 2001, he entered active politics, contesting the parliamentary seat of Igara County East, Bushenyi District. He won that seat and was re-elected in 2006. However, in 2011 he lost during the primary elections to the incumbent MP, Michael Muranga Mawanda, also of the National Resistance Movement (NRM) political party.

In 2001, he was appointed State Minister for Industry, serving in that capacity until 2003. He was then appointed State Minister for Trade, where he served until 2005. He then served briefly as State Minister for Local Government between 2005 and 2006. He was appointed State Minister of Health for General Duties, serving in that capacity from 2006 until he was appointed UN Ambassador in August 2012.

== See also ==
- Parliament of Uganda
- Cabinet of Uganda
- Bushenyi District
