= Masaka–Mutukula Road =

Road in Uganda

Route information
- Length: 56 mi (90 km)

Major junctions
- North end: Masaka
- Kalisizo; Kyotera; Kakuuto
- South end: Mutukula

Location
- Country: Uganda

Highway system
- Roads in Uganda

Masaka–Mutukula Road is a road in the Central Region of Uganda, connecting the city of Masaka, in Masaka District, to the border town of Mutukula in Kyotera District.

== Location ==
The road stars in Masaka, near the Uganda Police barracks, where this road forms a T-junction with Broadway Road. The road continues in a southwesterly direction, through Kalisizo, Kyotera and ends in Mutukula, at the international border with Tanzania, a total length of about 90 kilometres (56 mi).

== Overview ==
This road is part of the East African Community Road Network Project. It is the main road transport corridor between Uganda and Tanzania. The road is divided into two sections: (a) Masaka–Kyotera section, which measures 44 kilometres (27 mi), was built in 1960s and has begun to deteriorate and (b) Kyotera–Mutukula section, measuring 46 kilometres (29 mi), was originally constructed in the 1960s and was upgraded to class II bitumen standards in 2003 with a loan from the African Development Bank (AfDB). Section (b) was in good condition, as of 2006, while section (a) was in need of an upgrade.

== Upgrade and expansion ==
In January 2020, the government of Uganda began preparations to upgrade and expand the road, using funds sourced from the African Development Bank (AfDB). The single-carriageway road will be upgraded to class II bitumen surface, with culverts and drainage channels. The road width will be increased to 11 metres (36 ft). In the town of Kyotera, the width will be further increased to accommodate a 3 metres (10 ft) parking lane.

The engineering, procurement and construction (EPC) contract was awarded to Chongqing International Construction Corporation (CICCO). Included in this contract is the upgrade to bitumen class II of the Masaka-Villa Maria Road measuring 11 kilometres (7 mi) and the tarmacking of another 7 kilometres (4 mi) of roads within Masaka City. The contract price is reported as UGX:691 billion (approx. US$179 million).

CICCO entered into a 2-year pre-financing agreement with the government of Uganda (GoU). For the first two years the company will use its own money. The road also received funding from the AfDB, in form of a loan to the GoU. Completion of the upgrade is anticipated in 2028.

== See also ==
- List of roads in Uganda
