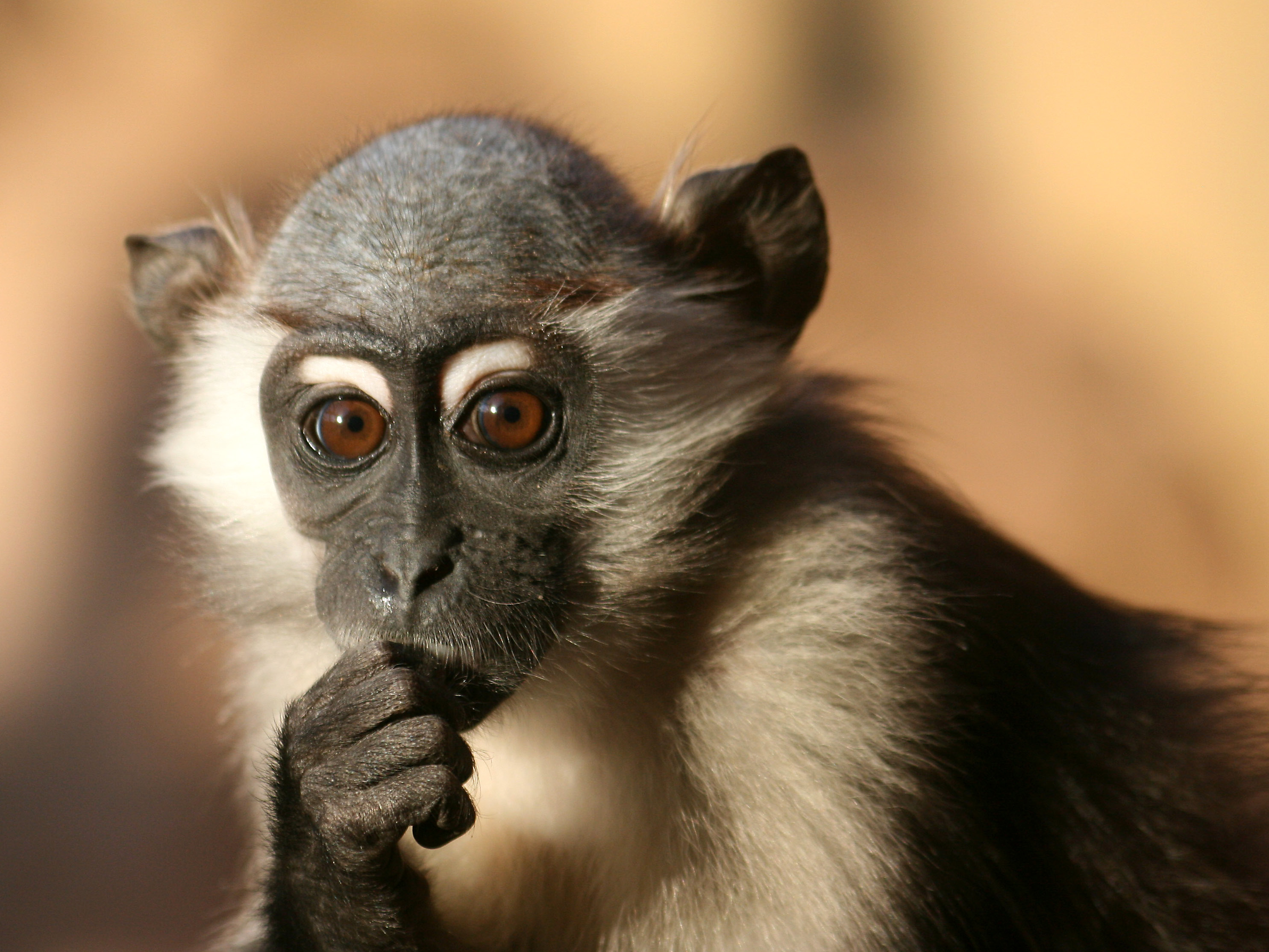
- Young cherry-crowned mangabey

Scientific classification
- Kingdom: Animalia
- Phylum: Chordata
- Class: Mammalia
- Order: Primates
- Family: Cercopithecidae
- Subfamily: Cercopithecinae
- Tribe: Papionini

Groups included
- Lophocebus Rungwecebus Cercocebus

Cladistically included but traditionally excluded taxa
- Macaca Papio Mandrillus

= Mangabey =

Mangabeys

Common name for group of mammals

Mangabeys are West African Old World monkeys, with species in three of the six genera of tribe Papionini.

== Characteristics ==
The more typical representatives of Cercocebus, also known as the white-eyelid mangabeys, are characterized by their bare, upper eyelids, which are lighter than their facial skin colouring, and the uniformly coloured hairs of their fur. Members of Lophocebus, the crested mangabeys, tend to have dark skin, eyelids that match their facial skin, and crests of hair on their heads.

Lophocebus and Cercocebus were once thought to be very closely related, so much so that all the species were in one genus, but the species within genus Lophocebus are now thought to be more closely related to the baboons in genus Papio, while the species within genus Cercocebus are more closely related to the mandrill.

== New species ==
A new species, the highland mangabey, was discovered in 2003 and was initially placed in Lophocebus. The genus Rungwecebus was later created for this species.

== Genera ==
The three genera of mangabeys are:

- Lophocebus, the crested mangabeys
- Rungwecebus, the highland mangabey (kipunji)
- Cercocebus, the white-eyelid mangabeys
