= Pacific Academy =

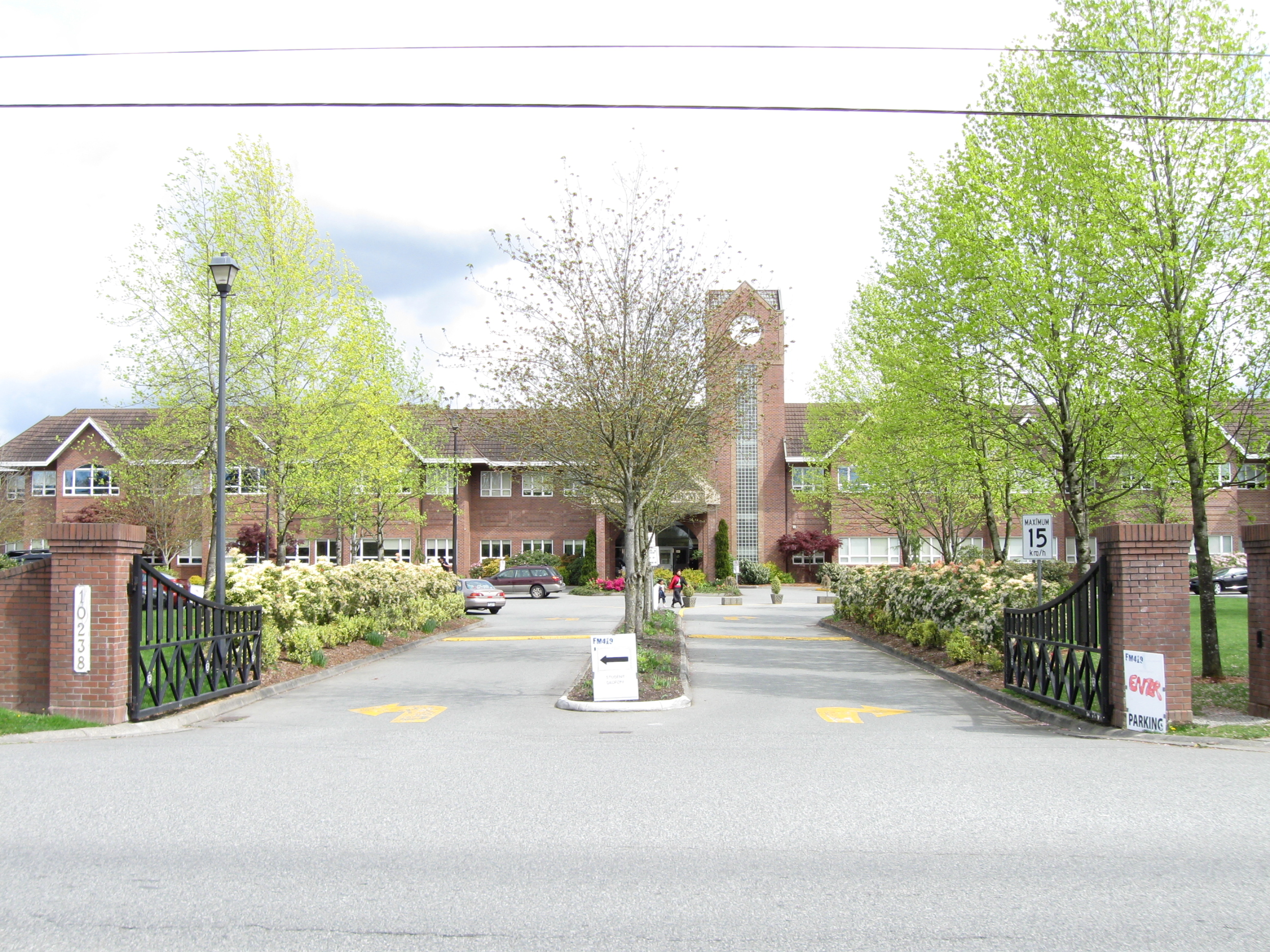
- Pacific Academy's school entrance

Location
- 10238 168 Street; Surrey, British Columbia, V4N 1Z4; Canada; 49.19°N, 122.76°W

Information
- School type: Private
- Religious affiliation: Pentecostal
- Founded: 1985
- Founder: Jim Pattison
- Head of school: Colleen Drisner
- Grades: K-12
- Enrollment: 1409
- Team name: Breakers
- Website: www.pacificacademy.net
- Last updated: May 26, 2020

Pacific Academy is an independent Christian school in Surrey, British Columbia, Canada that spans from preschool to Grade 12. The school has 4 classes per grade, and has over 200 staff members as well as over 1,400 students. It was started by Jim Pattison, a billionaire who donated money to create Pacific Academy. Pacific Academy also has an outreach program (PAOS) that spans the far reaches of the globe. For example, it supports the Kibaale community schools in Uganda. Pacific Academy was ranked by the Fraser Institute in the school year of 2017/2018, as 7th out of 251 British Columbian Secondary Schools.

== History ==
The school's main website states that the school was founded by Christian pastors in Coquitlam, 1985; with 200 students; the school moved to it's current campus in January 1991, and became an International Baccalaureate World School in 2004.

== Chandos Pattison Auditorium ==
Chandos Pattison Auditorium is one of four theaters in Surrey, British Columbia. Chandos Pattison Auditorium is named after the father of business magnate Jim Pattison. The auditorium is part of Pacific Academy. In September 2008, FireFighters for Christ held an event at the auditorium called A Night to Remember: A Tribute to September 11, 2001. Two months later, the Soweto Gospel Choir performed at the venue. Destino also performed there in November in an operatic pop benefit concert in support of the Delta Arts Council. In March 2011, there was a dance performance at the auditorium to raise awareness about human trafficking. The Surrey Symphony Society held a Christmas concert there in December 2011 and a spring concert in May 2012.

== Notable alumni ==
- Bynon - DJ, Record Producer, Music writer
- Gabriel Ho-Garcia - Olympic field hockey player (Canadian men's national team)
- Jessica Lowndes - Actress
- Melissa Roxburgh - Actress
