= Geoffrey Lutaaya =

Ugandan musician, businessmen and politician

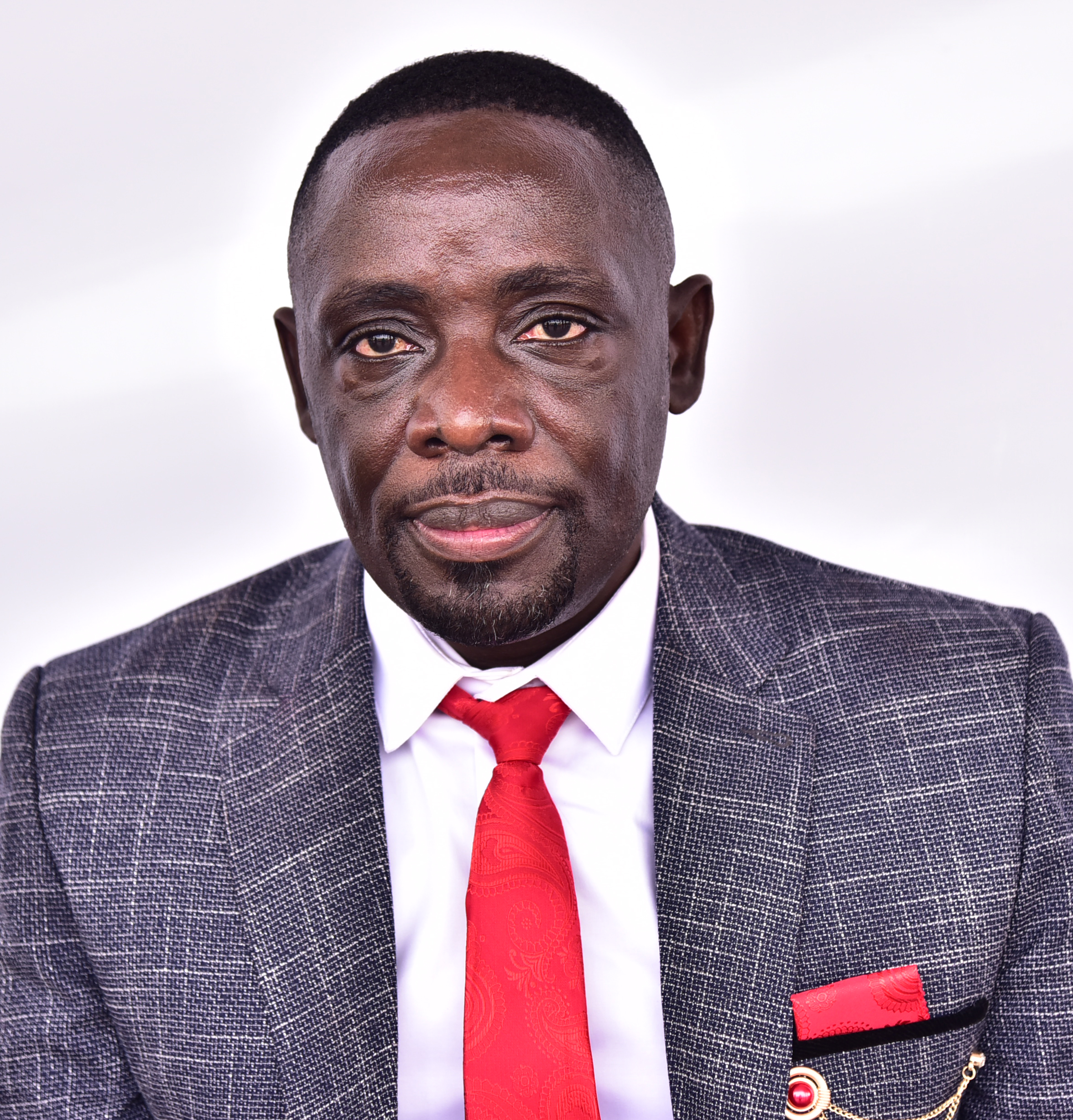

Member of Parliament for Kakuuto County, Kyotera District
- In office 2021–2026
- Succeeded by: Ismail Lubega

Personal details
- Born: Kyotera District, Uganda
- Party: National Unity Platform (NUP)
- Spouse: Irene Namatovu
- Children: Several
- Education: Makerere Day and Evening School for Adults (MAECA); Nkumba University
- Occupation: Musician, Politician
- Known for: Founder of De Nu Eagles Band; Member of Parliament

Geoffrey Lutaaya is a Ugandan musician, businessman and politician, who served as the Member of Parliament for Kakuuto County, Kyotera District, under the National Unity Platform (NUP) party in the 11th Parliament of Uganda from 2021 to 2026. He is the founder of the music band called the De Nu Eagles.

== Early life and education ==
Lutaaya was born to late Nelson Kaboggoza (father). Lutaaya attended Mitti Ebiri Primary School in Kyotera and later completed his primary education from Mbuye Primary School in Rakai. He then went to Kololo High School, but left before sitting for the Uganda Certificate of Education (O-level) exams as his music career began to grow. He later re-sat his O-levels at Makerere Day and Evening School for Adults (MAECA).

== Career ==
=== Music ===
Lutaaya is recognized as one of the contributors to the band music genre in Uganda and is a founder and member of the Da Nu Eagles Band. His career in the music industry is a long one with various live performances, recordings, and concerts.

After becoming a politician, he still made it known that he would not stop music. In February 2025, he was the main actor at the "Love Memories" concert held at Sheraton Kampala Hotel Gardens where he along with his band played for quit a long time.

==== Some of his Songs ====
- Nassanga
- Omukwano Gwewala
- Ojila Okyamudazza
- Obuwanguzi
- Akyali Mboko
- Linda
- Aliba Ani
- Choice Yange
- Omwaka Guno
- Olweeza
- Ekisa
- Justine
- Bamimwa Gyabwe
- Sandra
- Easy Come Easy Go
- Oli Musumba Wange
- Nalininda
- Kamaama
- Gwe Nalotanga
- Nalayira
- My Love
- Talina Musango
- Ayi Mukama
- Ndi Ready
- Nandibadde Bwomu
- Baby Girl Baby Boy
- Torch
- Agya Munsawo Yo
- Mwaali

=== Political ===
Lutaaya is known to have joined elective politics on the National Unity Platform ticket and got elected as the Member of Parliament for Kakuuto County in the 2021 general election. In the Parliament, he has been a member of the HIV/AIDS and Related Matters Committee.

In 2021, he gave Kakuuto County a new ambulance loaded with medical supplies to help with the transport of patients during the COVID-19 epidemic. He later added a second ambulance to the constituency to make healthcare more accessible.

In an interview in 2025, he said his election as a Member of Parliament was one of his childhood dreams that came true, and he attributed it to the fact that he was exposed to politics at a very early age when he used to go along with his father, a policeman, on community engagements.

== Personal life ==
Lutaaya is a husband of musician wife, Irene Namatovu, and she is also a well-known and a major member of the Da Nu Eagles Band.

== See also ==
- National Unity Platform
- Music of Uganda
- List of Ugandan musicians
