= Mutukula, Tanzania =

Town in Kagera Region, Tanzania

Mutukula Mtukula
- Location in Tanzania
- Coordinates: 01°00′04″S 31°24′54″E
- Country: Tanzania
- Region: Kagera Region
- District: Missenyi District
- Elevation: 370 m (1,200 ft)
- Time zone: UTC+3 (East Africa Time )
- UFI: -2570404
- Climate: Aw

Mutukula, sometimes spelled as Mtukula, is a small town in Missenyi District, Kagera Region, in northwestern Tanzania, at the border with Uganda. Formerly, the settlement on the border was known as Kyebisagazi, and Mutukula was a kilometre to the south on the east side of the Masaka-Bukoba Road (B8).

== Location ==
The town is located approximately 70 kilometres (43 mi) northwest of Bukoba, the regional capital.

== Population ==
The 2012 estimated population of Mutukula, Tanzania, was about 5,000. The immediately adjacent town in Uganda is about three times the size.

== See also ==
- Mutukula, Uganda
- Kyaka
- Kagera Region
