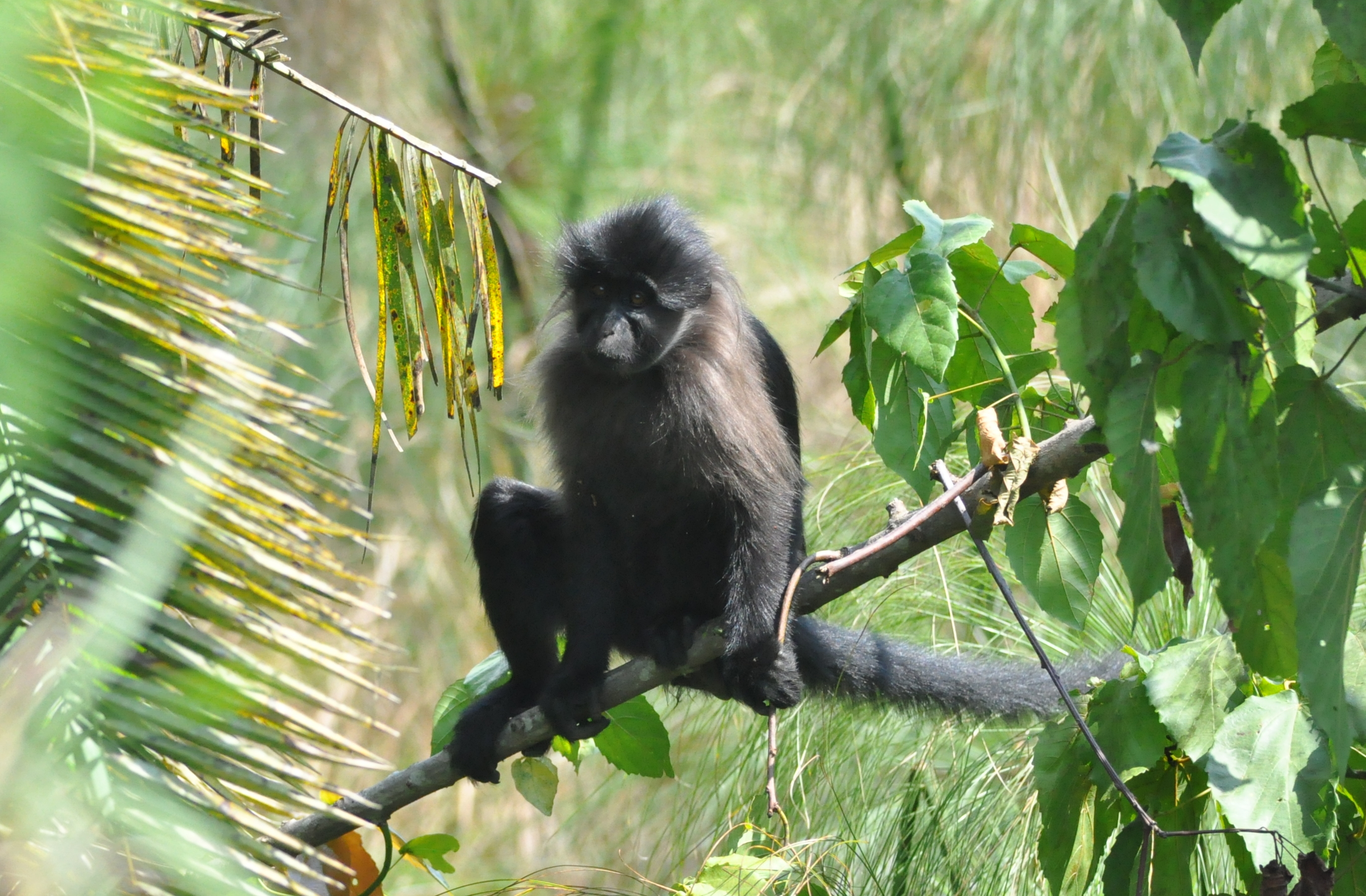

Conservation status
- Vulnerable (IUCN 3.1)

Scientific classification
- Kingdom: Animalia
- Phylum: Chordata
- Class: Mammalia
- Order: Primates
- Family: Cercopithecidae
- Genus: Lophocebus
- Species: L. albigena

Binomial name
- Lophocebus albigena (J. E. Gray, 1850)
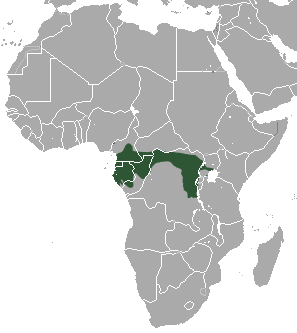
- Grey-cheeked mangabey range

= Grey-cheeked mangabey =

Species of Old World monkey

The grey-cheeked mangabey (Lophocebus albigena), also known as the white-cheeked mangabey, is an Old World monkey found in the forests of Central Africa. It ranges from Cameroon down to Gabon. The grey-cheeked mangabey is a dark monkey, looking in shape overall like a small, hairy baboon. Its thick brown fur is almost black in its forest home, with a slightly rufus/golden mane around the neck. The sexes are similar, with the males slightly larger than the females.

The grey-cheeked mangabey lives in a variety of habitats with the forests of Central Africa, it is generally thought to live in either swamp or primary forests, in some areas it has also been found in secondary forest as well. Some authors in the past have considered the species to be restricted to the forest canopy, however more recently habituated troops have been observed on the forest floor collecting food. It feeds primarily on fruit, particularly figs, taking other fruits seasonally, as well as shoots, flowers and insects.

The grey-cheeked mangabey lives in groups of between 5 and 30 individuals. The groups have either a single male or (more usually) several, without a single dominant male. Young males leave the troop once they are adult and join other troops, whereas the females stay in the troop of their birth. If troops become too large they may split. Confrontations between troops are rare, as this mangabey will usually avoid other troops. Their territories cover several square miles of forest, and can both overlap with other troops and shift over time.

Three subspecies of this mangabey were previously recognized. In 2007, Colin Groves elevated them all to species level, splitting one (johnstoni) into two species.
