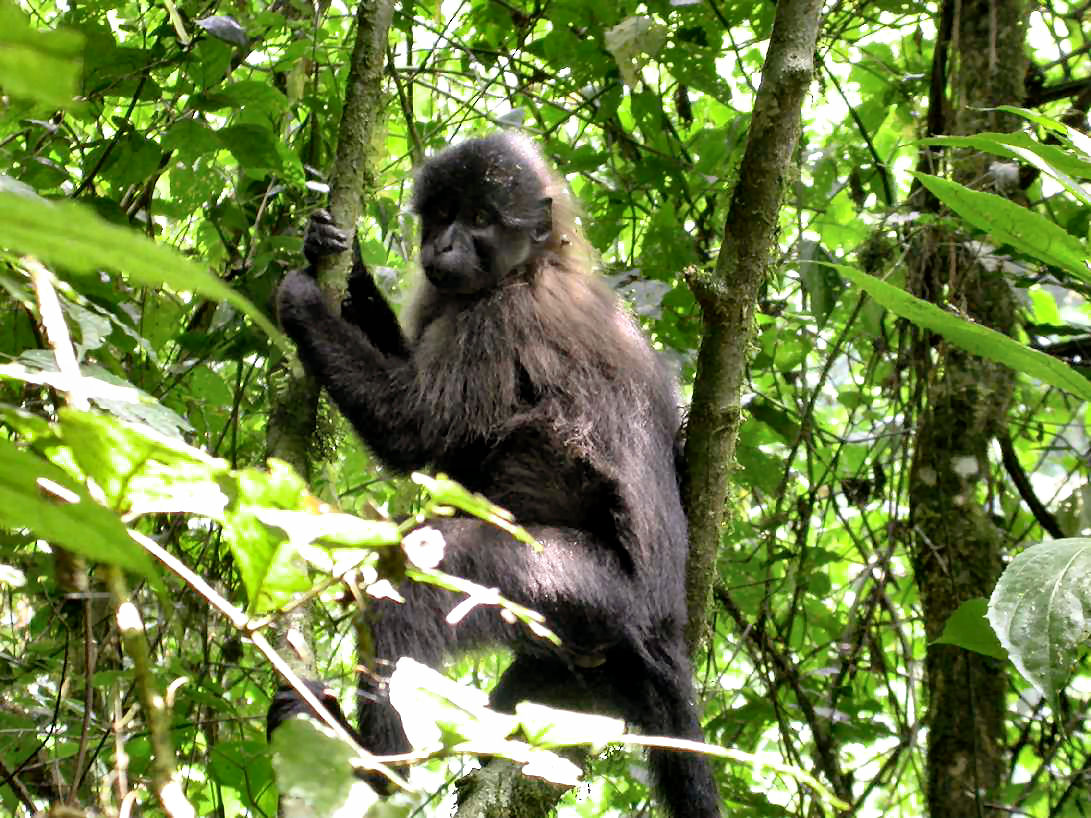
- Juvenile Uganda mangabey

Scientific classification
- Kingdom: Animalia
- Phylum: Chordata
- Class: Mammalia
- Order: Primates
- Suborder: Haplorhini
- Family: Cercopithecidae
- Subfamily: Cercopithecinae
- Tribe: Papionini
- Genus: Lophocebus; Palmer, 1903

Type species
- Presbytis albigena J. E. Gray, 1850

Species
- See text

= Crested mangabey =

Crested mangabeys

Genus of Old World monkeys

The crested mangabeys are West African Old World monkeys belonging to the genus Lophocebus. They tend to have dark skin, eyelids that match their facial skin, and crests of hair on their heads. Another genus of mangabeys, Cercocebus, was once thought to be very closely related, so much so that all the species were placed in one genus. However, Lophocebus species are now understood to be more closely related to the baboons in genus Papio, while the Cercocebus species are more closely related to the mandrill. In 2006, the highland mangabey was moved from Lophocebus to a new genus, Rungwecebus.

== Species ==
There are two species in this genus, with a total of six subspecies. In 2007, Colin Groves described a new subspecies and elevated the L. albigena subspecies to full species level, but the elevation was not widely accepted.

Genus Lophocebus – Palmer, 1903 – two species
Common name	Scientific name and subspecies	Range	Size and ecology	IUCN status and estimated population
Black crested mangabey	L. aterrimus (Oudemans, 1890) Two subspecies: L. a. aterrimus; L. a. opdenboschi	Central Africa	Size: 45–65 cm (18–26 in) long, plus 80–85 cm (31–33 in) tail Habitat: Forest Diet: Fruit	VU Unknown
Grey-cheeked mangabey	L. albigena (Gray, 1850) Four subspecies: L. a. albigena; L. a. johnstoni; L. a. osmani; L. a. ugandae	Central Africa	Size: 44–75 cm (17–30 in) long, plus 57–94 cm (22–37 in) tail Habitat: Forest Diet: Fruit and seeds	VU Unknown
