= Kyotera =

- Location in Uganda
- Coordinates: 00°37′54″S 31°32′36″E
- Country: Uganda
- Region: Central Uganda
- District: Kyotera District

Population (2014 census)
  - Total: 12,789

Kyotera is a town in the southern part of the Central Region of Uganda. It is a municipality in Kyotera District. However, the district headquarters are located at Kasaali.

== Location ==
Kyotera is located in the newly created Kyotera District. It lies approximately 44 kilometres (27 mi) southwest of Masaka, the largest city in the sub-region. This is approximately 29 kilometres (18 mi), by road, northeast of Rakai, where the district headquarters are located. The coordinates of the town are 0°37'54.0"S, 31°32'36.0"E (Latitude:-0.631667; Longitude:31.543333).

== Population ==
During the 2002 Uganda National Census, Kyotera's population was enumerated at 7,590. In 2010, the Uganda Bureau of Statistics (UBOS) estimated the population at 8,800. In 2011, UBOS estimated the mid-year population of at 9,000. During the national census and household survey of August 2014, the population of Kyotera was enumerated at 12,789 people.

== Points of interest ==
The following additional points of interest are located inside or near Kyotera: (a) the offices of Kyotera Town Council (b) Kyotera central market (c) the Offices of National Water & Sewerage Corporation, Kyotera Cluster (d) Masaka–Mutukula Road, passing through the town in a north/south configuration. and (e) Kasaali, a northern suburb of Kyotera is the location of the Kyotera District headquarters.

== Photos ==
- Kyotera Market In 2007

== See also ==
- Rakai District
- Kalisizo
- List of cities and towns in Uganda
