= Rakai District =

- District
- District location in Uganda
- Coordinates: 00°43′S 31°24′E
- Country: Uganda
- Region: Central Region of Uganda
- Capital: Rakai

Area
  - Land: 3,351.5 km^{2} (1,294.0 sq mi)

Population (2014 Census)
  - Total: 518,008
  - Density: 154.1/km^{2} (399/sq mi)
- Time zone: UTC+3 (EAT)
- Website: www.rakai.go.ug

Rakai District is a district in the Central Region of Uganda. The town of Rakai is the site of the district's headquarters.

== Location ==
Rakai District borders Lyantonde District to the northwest, Lwengo District to the north, Kyotera District to the northeast, Kalangala District to the east, the Kagera Region in the Republic of Tanzania to the south, Isingiro District to the southwest, and Kiruhura District to the northwest. The town of Rakai is approximately 65.5 kilometres (40.7 mi) southwest of Masaka, the largest city in the sub-region.

== Overview ==
On 1 July 2006, the northern part of the district known as Kabula County was split off to form Lyantonde District. Because of its proximity to Uganda's border with Tanzania, the district experiences cross-border commercial traffic to and from Bukoba. The Masaka–Mutukula Road traverses the district in a north to south direction. The first recorded case of HIV/AIDS in Uganda, was at Kasensero Landing Site, on the shores of Lake Victoria, in Rakai District. The disease has ravaged the district population, where prevalence rates were as high as 12 percent, as recently as 2014.

== Population ==
The 1991 national population census put the district population at about 330,400. In 2002, the next national census estimated the population of the district at 404,330, with an annual growth rate of 1.8 percent. In 2012, the district population was estimated at 484,400. The national household and population census conducted on 27 August 2014, enumerated the population of the district at 518,008.

== Administration ==
The town of Rakai is the chief municipal, political, and administrative center in the district. The district is divided into the following administrative units: (1) Kakuuto County (2) Kooki County. Rakai is the main town in the district. Other urban centers in Rakai District include Kiziba, Mweruka, Lwentulege.

== Health issues ==
The main health issues in the district include malaria, childhood malnutrition, diarrheal diseases, HIV/AIDS, obstetric complications, respiratory infections, cannibalism, and skin diseases.

== See also ==
- Kyotera
- Kalisizo
- Kakuuto
- Mutukula
