= Mutukula, Uganda =

Town in the Central Region of Uganda

Mutukula
- Location in Uganda
- Coordinates: 00°59′59″S 31°25′00″E
- Country: Uganda
- Region: Central Region
- District: Rakai District
- Elevation: 3,900 ft (1,190 m)

Population (2009 Estimate)
  - Total: 15,000

Mutukula is a town in southern Uganda. It sits adjacent to Mutukula, Tanzania, directly across the international border between Uganda and Tanzania.

== Location ==
Mutukula is located in the extreme southern Kyotera District at the international border between Uganda and Tanzania. The town is approximately 46 kilometres (29 mi), south of Kyotera, where the district headquarters are located. This is about 91 kilometres (57 mi), by road, south-west of Masaka, the nearest large city. This location is approximately 224 kilometres (139 mi), by road, south-west of Kampala, the capital and largest city of Uganda. The coordinates of the town are 00°59'59"S, 31°25'00"E (Latitude:-0.9997; Longitude:31.4167).

== Overview ==
The town of Mutukula is a border town between Uganda and Tanzania. At an altitude of 1,190 metres (3,900 ft), above sea level, Mutukula is an important border post and major crossing point, for both human and commercial traffic. In February 2016, the border post between both countries merged operations on both sides. Vehicles and passengers clear customs and immigration once, in the country they are entering, with officials from both countries present.

In 2017, the border crossing between Mutukula, Uganda and Mutukula, Tanzania was converted into a one-stop-border-post (OSBP), open 24 hours every day of the year. Vehicles, passengers, luggage, merchandise and pedestrians are cleared once by customs and immigration staff from both countries, at a station in the country of entry. This cuts the time it takes to cross by anywhere from 30 percent to 50 percent. Other stakeholders report reduction in crossing times by as much as 90 percent.

== Population ==
As of July 2009, the population of Mutukula was estimated at 15,000 people.

== Points of interest ==
The following additional points of interest lie within the town limits or close to the edges of the town: (a) offices of Mutukula Town Council (b) Mutukula Airport, a military and civilian airport, located approximately 10 kilometres (6 mi) north of town (c) Mutukula prison, a medium security corrections facility (d) Mutukula central market (e) Mutukula One Stop Border Post and (f) Sejonya Forex Bureau Limited.

== See also ==
- Mutukula, Tanzania
- List of cities and towns in Uganda
