= Kyotera District =

- District
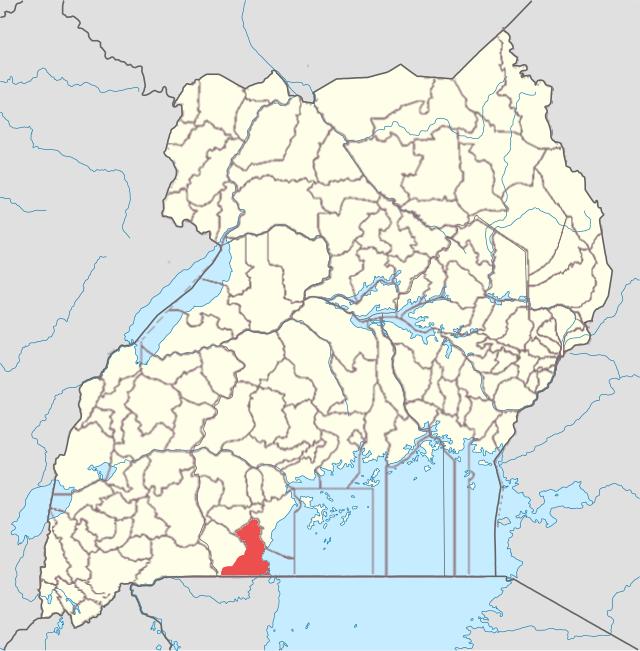
- Map of Ugandan districts with Kyotera highlighted in red
- Interactive map of Kyotera District
- Coordinates: 00°38′S 31°33′E
- Country: Uganda
- Region: Central Region
- Capital: Kasaali

Government
  - District Chairman (LCV Chairman): Patrick Kisekulo Kintu

Area
  - Total: 1,723 km^{2} (665 sq mi)

Population (2024 census)
  - Total: 275,917
  - Density: 160.1/km^{2} (414.8/sq mi)
- Time zone: UTC+3 (EAT)
- Website: www.kyotera.go.ug

Kyotera District is a district in the Central Region of Uganda. Kyotera is the largest town in the district but the district headquarters are located at Kasaali, a suburb of Kyotera.

== Location ==
The districts that surround Kyotera District include Rakai District, Lwengo District, Kalangala District and Masaka District. Directly south of the new district is the Missenyi District in the Kagera Region of Tanzania. Kasaali, the location of the district headquarters, is a suburb of Kyotera, the largest town in the district. The district headquarters are located approximately 47 kilometres (29 mi), by road, southwest of Masaka, the nearest large city. This is about 182 kilometres (113 mi), by road, southwest of Kampala, Uganda's capital and largest city.

== Overview ==
Created by in 2015, by Act of Parliament, Kyotera District became functional on 1 July 2017. Before that, it was part of the Rakai District. The new district comprises two counties of Kakuuto and Kyotera. The rationale given for the creation of the new district is "to bring government services closer to the people" and "improve service delivery".

== See also ==
- Districts of Uganda
