= List of conglomerates =

A conglomerate is a combination of multiple business entities operating in entirely different industries under one corporate group, usually involving a parent company and many subsidiaries.

Conglomerates are typically large and multinational corporations that manage diverse business operations across various sectors.

== Africa ==
=== Algeria ===
- Cevital

=== Kenya ===
- Centum Investments
- Co-operative Bank Group
- Equity Bank Group
- I&M Bank Group
- KCB Bank Group
- Nation Media Group
- Olympia Capital Holdings
- Sameer Group
- TransCentury Limited

=== Morocco ===
- Siger
- Société Nationale d'Investissement (SNI)

=== Nigeria ===
- Dangote Group
- John Holt Plc
- Transnational Corporation of Nigeria
- United Africa Company of Nigeria
- GTCO Group

=== South Africa ===
- AASHAY
- ABSA
- Anglo American Platinum Ltd
- Bidvest Group
- Capitec
- Cell C
- Denel
- DStv
- eNCA
- Eskom
- FirstRand Limited
- Investec
- MTN
- Naspers
- Nedbank
- Old Mutual
- Remgro
- SABC
- Sanlam
- Sasol
- Shoprite Holdings
- Standard Bank
- Super Sports
- Telkom
- Transnet
- Vodacom

=== Uganda ===
- Alam Group
- Aya Group
- BMK Group
- DFCU Group
- Ham Group
- International Medical Group
- Madhvani Group
- Mara Group
- Mukwano Group
- Mulwana Group
- New Vision Group
- ROKO Construction Company
- Ruparelia Group
- Simba Group
- Tirupati Group
- Wavah Group

== Asia ==
=== Azerbaijan ===
- AF Holding
- Azersun Holding
- PASHA Holding

=== Bahrain ===
- Fakhro Group
- Nass Corporation
- Yusuf bin Ahmed Kanoo Group

=== Bangladesh ===
- A K Khan & Company
- Advanced Chemical Industries
- Akij
- Bashundhara Group
- Beximco
- City Group
- Concord Group
- Confidence Group
- Grameen
- Habib Group
- KDS Group
- M. M. Ispahani Limited
- Nasir Group
- Nassa Group
- Navana Group
- Orion Group
- Partex Group
- PRAN-RFL Group
- S. Alam Group of Industries
- Summit Group
- T K Group of Industries
- Transcom Group
- United Group

=== Cambodia ===
- Canadia Group
- Overseas Cambodian Investment Corporation

=== China, Mainland ===
- BAIC Group
- Beijing Enterprises
- Beijing North Star
- BYD
- China Aerospace Science and Technology Corporation
- China Everbright Group
- China Huaneng Group
- China Merchants Group
- China Metallurgical Group Corporation
- China Poly Group Corporation
- China Resources
- CIMC
- CITIC Group
- Comac
- COSCO
- CRRC Group
- Dalian Wanda Group
- Dongfeng Motor Corporation
- FAW Group
- Fosun International
- Founder Group
- Geely
- Guangxi Guitang Group
- Hasee
- Huawei
- Hytera
- JAC Group
- JXD
- Legend Holdings
- Liaoning Chengda
- Maoye International
- Nepstar
- Orient Group
- Ping An Bank
- Ping An Insurance
- SAIC Motor
- Shanghai Industrial Holdings
- Shenzhen Media Group
- Shougang Concord International
- Sinochem Group
- Sinomach
- TCL
- Tencent
- Tianjin Development
- Tianjin Teda Company
- TP-Link
- Vanke
- Xiaomi
- Yatai Group
- Zhujiang Beer
- ZTE

=== Hong Kong ===
- Chow Tai Fook Enterprises
- CK Hutchison Holdings
- Dah Chong Hong
- First Pacific
- Henderson Investment
- Hong Kong Ferry
- Jardine Matheson
- Lai Sun Group
- Melco International Development
- Miramar Hotel and Investment
- NWS Holdings
- Swire Group
- The Wharf (Holdings)

==== State-owned conglomerates, China ====
- Beijing Enterprises
- China Resources
- China Travel International Investment Hong Kong
- CITIC Pacific
- COSCO (Hong Kong) Group
- Guangdong Investment
- Shougang Concord International

=== India ===
- ACG Group
- Action Group
- Adani Group
- Aditya Birla Group
- Ador Group
- Adventz Group
- Ajanta Group
- Alchemist Group
- Amalgamations Group
- Amara Raja Group
- Apeejay Surrendra Group
- Arvind
- Avantha Group
- Bajaj Group
- Baldota Group
- Bannari Amman Group
- Bharti Enterprises
- Binani Industries
- Bird Group of Companies
- Chettinad Group
- CK Birla Group
- Dabur Group
- Dalmia Group
- Elecon Group
- Emami
- Escorts Limited
- Essar Group
- Essel Group
- Financial Technologies Group
- Finolex Group
- Firodia Group
- Future Group
- GMR Group
- Godrej Group
- GVK Power & Infrastructure
- Hero Group
- Hinduja Group
- India Today Group
- Indiabulls
- Info Edge
- Inox Group
- ITC Limited
- Jaypee Group
- JBM Group (Jay Bharat Maruti)
- JSW Group
- Jubilant Bhartia Group
- Kalyani Group
- Karvy Group
- Khoday Group
- Kirloskar Group
- Lanco Infratech
- Larsen & Toubro
- The Leela Group
- Mahindra Group
- Manipal Education and Medical Group
- Max Group
- Mehta Group
- Modi Enterprises
- M.P Birla Group
- MRF
- Murugappa Group
- The Muthoot Group
- Muthoot Pappachan Group
- National Dairy Development Board
- Peerless Group
- Piramal Group
- Poonawalla Group
- Raheja Group
- Ramoji Group
- Rane Group
- Raymond Group
- Rebel Foods
- Reliance Group
- Reliance Industries
- RPG Group
- RPSG Group
- Sakthi Group
- Samvardhana Motherson Group
- Shapoorji Pallonji Group
- Shriram Group
- Sonalika Group
- S.R.S Group
- SUN Group
- Supreme Industries
- Tata Group
- TCG Group
- Thapar Group
- Thermax
- The Times Group
- Torrent Group
- Triveni Group
- TTK Group
- TVS Group
- United Breweries Group
- UTL Group
- V H Group
- V-Guard Industries
- Vadilal
- Vardhman Group of Companies
- Vedanta Group
- Videocon Group
- VRL Group
- Wadia Group
- Walchand group
- Wave Group
- Welspun Group
- Yash Birla Group

=== Indonesia ===
- Astra International
- Bakrie Group
- Bumi Laut Group
- CT Corp
- Elang Mahkota Teknologi
- Harita Group
- Kalbe Farma
- Kompas Gramedia Group
- Lion Air
- Lippo Group
- Mayapada Group
- MNC Corporation
- Rajawali Corpora
- Salim Group
- Sinar Mas Group

=== Iran ===
- Aabsal
- Defense Industries Organization
- Ghadir Investment Company
- IDRO Group
- Iran Electronics Industries
- Maadiran Group

=== Israel ===
- Africa Israel Investments
- Delek
- International Metalworking Companies
- Israel Corporation

=== Japan ===
- Asahi Breweries
- Asahi Kasei
- Bandai Namco Holdings
- Furukawa Group
- Hitachi
- Honda
- Itochu
- Japan Post Holdings
- Japan Railways Group
- Japan Tobacco
- JX Holdings
- Kadokawa Dwango
- Kao Corporation
- Kawasaki Heavy Industries
- Kirin Company, Limited
- Kodenshi AUK Group
- Konami
- Kubota
- Lotte
- Marubeni
- Mitsubishi
- Mitsui
- NEC
- Nintendo
- Nippon Telegraph and Telephone
- Nomura Group
- Panasonic
- Rakuten
- Sapporo Brewery
- Sega Sammy Holdings
- Seiyu Group
- Showa Denko
- Sojitz
- Sony
- Square Enix (Taito)
- Subaru Corporation
- Sumitomo Group
- Suntory
- Tokyu Group
- Toray Industries
- Toshiba
- Toyota Group
- Ube Industries
- Yamaha Corporation
- Yamaha Motor Company

=== Macau ===
- Galaxy Entertainment Group
- Melco International Development
- Sociedade de Turismo e Diversões de Macau

=== Malaysia ===
- Berjaya Group
- DRB-HICOM
- Genting Group
- Hong Leong Group
- IOI Group
- Johor Corporation
- Media Prima
- Naza
- Petronas
- Sime Darby
- Sunway Group
- UMW Holdings
- Usaha Tegas
- YTL Corporation

=== Mongolia ===
- MAK Corporation
- Monnis Group
- Newcom Group
- Unitel Group

=== Myanmar ===
- Htoo Group of Companies
- Max Myanmar

=== Nepal ===
- Bhat-Bhateni Group
- Chaudhary Group

=== Pakistan ===
- ARY Digital Network
- Atlas Group
- Bahria Town
- Dawood Group
- Dewan Mushtaq Group
- Fecto Group
- Hashoo Group
- House of Habib
- Jahangir Siddiqui Group
- Lakson Group
- Nishat Group
- Saif Group

=== Philippines ===
- Aboitiz Equity Ventures
- ABS-CBN Corporation
- Ayala Corporation
- Filinvest
- GMA Network
- GT Capital Holdings
- JG Summit Holdings
- Lopez Group of Companies
- LT Group
- Metro Pacific Investments Corporation
- Motortrade
- PLDT
- San Miguel Corporation
- SM Investments
- Top Frontier Investment Holdings

=== Qatar ===
- Al Jazeera Media Network
- Industries Qatar
- Nehmeh
- Qatar Investment & Projects Development Holding Company
- Seashore Group

=== Saudi Arabia ===
- Dallah Al-Baraka
- Kingdom Holding
- SABIC
- Saudi Aramco
- Saudi Binladin Group (active)

=== Singapore ===
- ComfortDelGro
- Keppel Corporation

=== South Korea ===
- Aju Group
- CJ Group
- Daelim Group
- Dongbu Group
- Doosan Group
- Eugene Group
- GS Group
- Halla Group
- Hanjin
- Hansol
- Hanwha Group
- HYBE Corporation
- Hyosung
- Hyundai Group
- Hyundai Motor Group
- ILJIN Group
- Isu Group
- KG Group
- KT Corporation
- Kumho Asiana Group
- LG Corp
- Lotte
- LS Group
- Nongshim
- POSCO
- Samsung
- Shinsegae
- SK Group
- SPC Group
- STX Corporation
- Taekwang Group
- Tongyang Group
- YTN Group

=== Sri Lanka ===
- LOLC Holdings
- Aitken Spence
- Distilleries Company of Sri Lanka
- Hayleys
- Hemas Holdings
- John Keells Holdings

=== Taiwan ===
- 85C Bakery Cafe
- Acer
- Asus
- Bank of Kaohsiung
- Chatime
- Chunghwa Telecom
- Evergreen Marine
- Faraday Technology
- Giant Bicycles
- HTC
- Maxxis
- MediaTek
- Microtek
- MSI
- Taiwan Beer
- Taiwan Mobile
- TKK Fried Chicken
- TSMC
- UMC
- Zyxel

=== Thailand ===
- Central Group
- Charoen Pokphand Group
- The Erawan Group
- GMM Grammy
- Intouch Holdings
- Minor International
- PTT Group
- RS
- Samart Group
- Siam Cement Group

=== Turkey ===
- Doğan Holding
- Doğuş Holding
- Eczacıbaşı
- Koç Holding
- Sabancı Holding
- Ugur Group Companies
- Yıldız Holding
- Zorlu Holding

=== United Arab Emirates ===
- Al-Futtaim Group
- Al-Ghurair Group
- Aster DM Healthcare
- Dubai World
- Landmark Group
- LuLu Group International
- RP Group
- Stallion Group

=== Vietnam ===
- EVN
- Petrolimex
- Petrovietnam
- Viettel
- Vinacomin
- VinGroup
- VNPT

=== Yemen ===
- Al-Ahmar Group
- Hayel Saeed Anam Group
- Saudi Binladin Group (Company founded by a Yemeni immigrant)
- Shaher Trading Group

== Europe ==
=== Austria ===
- Andritz AG
- Red Bull GmbH
- Voestalpine AG

=== Belgium ===
- Ackermans & van Haaren
- Anheuser-Busch InBev
- Groupe Bruxelles Lambert
- Sofina

=== Croatia ===
- Fortenova

=== Czech Republic ===
- Agrofert
- ČEZ
- Energetický a průmyslový holding
- PPF

=== Denmark ===
- Carlsberg Group
- Maersk

=== Finland ===
- Amer Sports
- Fiskars
- Kemira
- Kesko
- Kone
- Metso
- Neste
- Nokia
- Patria
- S Group
- UPM
- Valmet
- Wärtsilä

=== France ===
- Alstom
- Areva
- AXA
- Banijay Group
- Bolloré
- Bouygues
- Danone
- Dassault Group
- Engie
- Groupe Casino
- Groupe SEB
- Kering
- Lactalis
- Lagardère Group
- Louis Dreyfus Group
- LVMH
- Orange Group
- Pernod Ricard
- Renault
- Safran
- Schneider Electric
- Technicolor SA
- Total S.A.
- Veolia Environment
- Vivendi

=== Germany ===
- BASF
- Bayer
- Bertelsmann
- BMW
- Bosch
- Deutsche Telekom
- Evonik Industries
- Fresenius
- Freudenberg Group
- GEA Group
- Linde
- Mercedes-Benz Group
- ProSiebenSat.1 Media
- Schaeffler Group
- Siemens
- ThyssenKrupp
- Volkswagen Group

=== Gibraltar ===
- SIMPLE Group

=== Greece ===
- Marfin Investment Group
- Mytilineos Holdings
- OTE
- Vivartia

=== Ireland ===
- Cooper Industries
- DCC

=== Italy ===
- Assicurazioni Generali
- Barilla Group
- CIR Group
- CNH Industrial
- Enel
- Eni
- Exor
- Ferrero SpA
- Fincantieri
- Fininvest
- Gruppo Campari
- Italcementi
- Leonardo
- Luxottica
- Mediaset
- RCS MediaGroup
- ST Microelectronics
- Techint
- TIM Group
- UniCredit

=== Netherlands ===
- AkzoNobel
- DSM
- Heineken Group
- Liberty Global
- Philips
- Pon Holdings
- SHV Holdings
- Stellantis

=== Norway ===
- Aker ASA
- Bonheur
- Fred. Olsen & Co.
- Ganger Rolf ASA
- Kongsberg Gruppen
- Norsk Hydro
- Orkla Group
- Telenor
- Tomra

=== Poland ===
- Grupa Kapitałowa Immobile (pl)
- Polska Grupa Zbrojeniowa
- Grupa Kapitałowa Cyfrowy Polsat (pl)

=== Portugal ===
- Altri
- Cofina
- Corticeira Amorim
- EDP
- Galp Energia
- Grupo José de Mello
- Grupo RAR
- Grupo Salvador Caetano
- Impresa
- Jerónimo Martins
- Media Capital
- Mota-Engil
- Semapa
- Soares da Costa
- Sogrape
- Sonae
- Sumol + Compal
- Teixeira Duarte
- Unicer
- Visabeira

=== Romania ===
- Țiriac Holdings

=== Russia ===
- Alfa Group
- Basic Element
- Interros
- OMZ
- Renova Group
- Rostec
- Sistema

=== Serbia ===
- Delta
- MK Group

=== Spain ===
- Abengoa
- Abertis
- Acciona
- Altadis
- Endesa
- Ferrovial
- Grupo Vocento
- Iberdrola
- Inditex
- Mediaset España Comunicación
- Mondragon Corporation
- PRISA
- Repsol
- Santander Group
- SENER
- Telefónica

=== Sweden ===
- Atlas Copco
- Electrolux
- Ericsson
- Sandvik
- Trelleborg AB
- Volvo

=== Switzerland ===
- ABB Group
- Embracer Group
- Nestlé
- Stadler Rail

=== Ukraine ===
- SCM Holdings

=== United Kingdom ===
- Acromas Holdings
- Anglo American plc
- Anime Limited
- Associated British Foods
- BAE Systems
- Bestway
- British American Tobacco
- BT Group
- Caparo
- Co-operative Group
- Diageo
- easyGroup
- Experian
- IHG Hotels & Resorts
- Imperial Tobacco
- Invensys
- Johnson Matthey
- Liberty Global
- Libra Group
- Merlin Entertainments
- Reckitt Benckiser
- Rio Tinto
- Rolls-Royce Holdings
- Seamark Group
- Smiths Group
- Swire Group
- Tomkins
- Unilever
- Virgin Group
- Vodafone
- Weir Group

== North America ==
=== Canada ===
- Anthem Sports & Entertainment
- Argus Corporation
- Aylo
- Barrick Gold
- Bell
- Blackberry Limited
- Boat Rocker Media
- Bombardier Inc.
- CAE Inc.
- Calfrac Well Services
- Calian
- Canadian Broadcasting Corporation
- Canadian Utilities
- CGI Inc.
- Cineplex Entertainment
- Corus Entertainment
- Empire Company
- Fairfax Financial
- Franco-Nevada
- J. D. Irving
- Jim Pattison Group
- Loblaw Companies
- Power Corporation of Canada
- Quebecor
- Rogers Communications
- Royal Bank of Canada
- Shaw Communications
- TC Energy
- Telus Corporation
- Thomson Reuters
- Toronto-Dominion Bank
- Torstar
- Triple Five Group
- WildBrain

=== Costa Rica ===
- Florida Ice and Farm Company

=== Cuba ===
- Cubatabaco
- Habanos

=== Dominican Republic ===
- Central Romana Corporation
- CND
- Grupo Corripio
- Grupo León Jimenes

=== El Salvador ===
- Grupo Poma

=== Jamaica ===
- Grace Kennedy and Company Limited
- Lasco Jamaica

=== Mexico ===
- ALFA
- América Móvil
- Arca Continental
- Cervecería de Baja California
- Cuauhtémoc Moctezuma Brewery
- FEMSA
- Grupo Aeroportuario Centro Norte
- Grupo Aeroportuario del Pacífico
- Grupo Aeroportuario del Sureste
- Grupo Bimbo
- Grupo Carso
- Grupo Elektra
- Grupo Empresarial Ángeles
- Grupo Lala
- Grupo México
- Grupo Modelo
- Grupo Salinas
- Grupo Tampico
- MVS Comunicaciones
- Pemex
- Soriana
- Televisa

=== United States ===
- 3M
- Access Industries
- AL-Dewan Royal Holding Group
- Advanced Micro Devices
- Alphabet
- Altra Industrial Motion
- Altria
- Amazon
- Amblin Partners
- AMC Global Media
- AMC Theatres
- Ametek
- Analog Devices
- Apple Inc.
- AT&T
- Authentic Brands Group
- Berkshire Hathaway
- Blackstone
- Boeing
- Brunswick Corporation
- Carlisle Companies
- Cascade Investment
- Cedar Fair
- Charter Communications
- Cinemark
- Colgate-Palmolive
- Comcast
- Crane
- Danaher Corporation
- Dell Technologies
- Discotek Media
- Dover Corporation
- Dow Chemical Company
- DuPont
- DXC Technology
- Eaton Corporation
- EDGE Tech
- Emerson Electric
- Entertainment Studios
- Ford
- Fox Corporation
- Gannett
- General Dynamics
- General Electric
- General Mills
- General Motors
- Gray Television
- Griffon Corporation
- Hearst Corporation
- Hendricks Holding Company
- Herschend Family Entertainment
- The Hershey Company
- Hewlett Packard Enterprise
- Honeywell
- Hormel
- HP
- Hubbard Broadcasting
- IAC
- IBM
- Ilitch Holdings
- Illinois Tool Works
- InFocus
- Intel Corporation
- ITT Corporation
- Jarden
- Johnson & Johnson
- Johnson Controls
- KEMET Corporation
- Keurig Dr Pepper
- Koch Industries
- Kohler
- Kraft Heinz
- Leonard Green & Partners
- Leucadia National
- Liberty Media
- Libra Group
- Lockheed Martin
- Loews Corporation
- M&F Worldwide
- Magnavox
- Mandalay Entertainment Group
- Mars
- Meta Platforms
- MGA Zapf Creation GmbH
- Microsoft
- Mondelēz International
- Motorola Solutions
- NACCO Industries
- National Presto Industries
- Netflix, Inc.
- Newell Brands
- News Corp
- Nexstar Media Group
- Nike
- Northrop Grumman
- Nvidia
- Olin Corporation
- Oracle Corporation
- Paramount Skydance
- Parker Hannifin
- Pentair
- PepsiCo
- PerkinElmer
- Philip Morris International
- Procter & Gamble
- Qurate Retail Group
- Raven Industries
- Red Apple Group
- Regal Entertainment Group
- Renco Group
- Reynolds American
- Right Stuf
- Roper Technologies
- RTX Corporation
- S.C. Johnson
- Seaboard Corporation
- SeaWorld Parks & Entertainment
- Sentai Filmworks
- Sinclair Broadcast Group
- SPX Corporation
- Spyglass Media Group
- Starbucks
- Tegna
- Teledyne Technologies
- TelevisaUnivision
- Tesla
- Textron
- Timken Company
- TKO Group Holdings
- Tribune Publishing
- Trinity Industries
- Viz Media
- Vizio
- The Walt Disney Company
- Warner Bros. Discovery
- Wonderful Company
- Xerox
- Xylem

== South America ==
=== Argentina ===
- Grupo Arcor
- Grupo Clarín
- Techint
- YPF

=== Bolivia ===
- Banco Mercantil Santa Cruz
- Banco Nacional de Bolivia

=== Brazil ===
- AmBev
- Andrade Gutierrez
- Banco Bradesco
- Banco do Brasil
- BRF
- Camargo Corrêa
- Cosan
- EBX Group
- Eletrobras
- Embraer
- GPA
- Grupo Abril
- Grupo Bandeirantes de Comunicação
- Grupo Folha
- Grupo Globo
- Grupo Petrópolis
- Grupo RBS
- Grupo Record
- Grupo Silvio Santos
- Hypermarcas
- Itaúsa
- JBS
- Marfrig
- Odebrecht
- Petrobras
- Safra Group
- Souza Cruz
- Synergy Group
- Ultrapar
- Vale
- Votorantim Group

=== Chile ===
- AntarChile
- Banco de Chile
- CCU
- Cencosud
- Concha y Toro
- Empresas Copec
- Enersis
- Falabella
- Quiñenco
- Sigdo Koppers

=== Colombia ===
- Alpina Productos Alimenticios
- Bavaria
- Ecopetrol
- EPM
- Grupo Argos
- Grupo Aval Acciones y Valores
- Grupo Bancolombia
- Grupo Empresarial Antioqueño
- Grupo Éxito
- Grupo Nutresa
- Grupo Sura
- Organización Ardila Lülle
- Organizacion Corona
- Quala
- Synergy Group

=== Paraguay ===
- Grupo Cartes

=== Peru ===
- Ajegroup
- Corporación Lindley S.A.
- Enrique Cassinelli and Sons
- Grupo Breca de Alex Fort Brescia, Ana Maria Brescia Cafferata, etc.
- Grupo Gloria de Vito Rodriguez Rodriguez
- Grupo Romero (familia Romero): Alicorp, Credicorp, Banco de Crédito del Perú, Primax, etc.
- Intercorp de Carlos Rodríguez-Pastor: Interbank, Supermercados Peruanos, GlobalNet, etc.

=== Venezuela ===
- CANTV
- Corporación Venezolana de Guayana
- Empresas 1BC
- Empresas Polar
- Grupo Cisneros
- Mercantil Servicios Financieros
- PDVSA

== Oceania ==
=== Australia ===
- BHP
- Foster's Group
- Madman Entertainment
- Pacific Dunlop
- Rio Tinto
- Siren Visual
- Soul Patts
- Toll Group
- Village Roadshow
- Wesfarmers
- Woolworths

=== New Zealand ===
- Infratil
- The Warehouse Group

== Defunct conglomerates ==
=== Argentina ===
- Bunge y Born

=== Australia ===
- Adelaide Steamship Company
- Bond Corporation
- BTR Nylex
- Clyde Engineering
- Howard Smith
- Perry Engineering
- Mayne Group
- Pacific Dunlop
- Southcorp

=== Belgium ===
- InBev
- Interbrew
- Société Générale de Belgique

=== Brazil ===
- Companhia Cervejaria Brahma

=== Canada ===
- Alliance Atlantis Communications
- Alliance Films
- Astral Media
- CanWest
- Peace Arch Entertainment
- Phase 4 Films
- Seagram
- Shaw Communications

=== China ===
- BBK Electronics

=== Colombia ===
- D.M.G. Grupo Holding S.A.

=== Denmark ===
- East Asiatic Company

=== France ===
- Crédit Lyonnais
- PSA Group

=== Germany ===
- AEG
- Cassella
- Hoechst AG
- IG Farben
- Thyssen AG

=== Italy ===
- Breda
- Caproni
- Fiat S.p.A.
- Gio. Ansaldo & C.

=== South Korea ===
- Daewoo
- Keo-Pyung
- SsangYong Group

=== Ukraine ===
- Yuzhmash

=== United Kingdom ===
- British Leyland
- Fiat Chrysler Automobiles
- Rover Group

=== United States ===
- 21st Century Fox
- The 3DO Company
- ACME Communications
- American Broadcasting-Paramount Theatres
- Atari Corporation
- Atari Games
- Beatrice Foods
- Cablevision
- Cadence Industries
- Carolco Pictures
- CBS Corporation
- Combustion Engineering
- Cox Enterprises
- Defy Media
- Discovery Inc.
- Douglas Aircraft Company
- General Cinema
- General Foods
- Goodtimes Entertainment
- Grumman
- Gulf and Western Industries
- Heinz
- Heublein
- Hewlett-Packard
- Kellogg's
- Kinney National Company
- Kraft Foods
- Kraft Foods (1903–2012)
- Level 3 Communications
- Ling-Temco-Vought
- Lockheed Corporation
- Lorimar-Telepictures
- Martin Marietta
- MCA Inc.
- McDonnell Aircraft
- McDonnell Douglas
- Midway Games
- Motorola
- News Corporation
- Northrop Corporation
- Paramount Communications
- Paramount Global
- Raycom Media
- RJR Nabisco
- RKO General
- Skydance Media
- Spelling Entertainment Group
- Standard Oil
- Time Warner Cable
- Tribune Broadcasting
- Tribune Media
- TRW Inc.
- TVX Broadcast Group
- TW Telecom
- US West
- Viacom (1952–2005)
- Viacom (2005–2019)
- Warner Communications
- WarnerMedia
- The Weinstein Company

== See also ==
- List of multinational corporations
