= List of sugar manufacturers in Uganda =

This is a list of sugar manufacturers in Uganda.

== Large sugar manufacturers ==
Established sugar manufacturers in Uganda:

- GM Sugar Uganda Limited
- Kakira Sugar Works
- Kinyara Sugar Works Limited
- Sango Bay Estates Limited
- Sugar Corporation of Uganda Limited

== Small sugar manufacturers ==
In November 2011, the Uganda government licensed a number of new sugar manufacturers, to address the sugar deficits that had hit the country.

- Amuru Sugar Works Limited – Amuru District
- Atiak Sugar Factory – Atiak, Amuru District
- Bugiri Sugar Factory – Bugiri District
- Buikwe Sugar Works Limited – Buikwe District
- Busia Sugar Limited – Busia District
- CN Sugar Factory Limited – Namayingo District
- Hoima Sugar Limited
- Kamuli Sugar Limited – Kamuli District
- Kenlon Industries Uganda Limited – Buyende, Buyende District
- Kyankwanzi Sugar Works Limited – Kyankwanzi District
- Mayuge Sugar Industries Limited – Mayuge District
- Mukwano Sugar Factory – Masindi District
- Sugar & Allied Industries Limited – Kaliro District
- Victoria Sugar Limited - Luweero District

== Output and market share ==
As of December 2014, the output and market share of each manufacturer is summarized in the table below:

Annual output and market share of sugar manufacturers in Uganda
Rank	Name of manufacturer	2014 output (metric tonnes)	Market share
1	Kakira Sugar Works Limited	180,000	41.06%
2	Kinyara Sugar Works Limited	120,360	27.45%
3	Sugar Corporation of Uganda Limited	73,500	16.77%
4	Sugar & Allied Industries Limited	29,500	6.73%
5	Others	35,000	7.98%
	Total	438,400	100.00%

- Totals may be a little off due to rounding.

In April 2020, Uganda's annual sugar output was estimated at 510,000 metric tonnes. With Uganda's annual consumption of 360,000 metric tonnes, approximately 150,000 metric tonnes annually are available for export.

As of November 2020, national sugar output was estimated at 550,000 metric tonnes annually. At the same time, annual national consumption was estimated at 370,000 metric tonnes. This leaves a surplus of approximately 180,000 metric tonnes annually. Due to refusal by three of Uganda's immediate neighbors (Rwanda, Kenya and Tanzania) to allow sugar imports from Uganda, the national sugar stockpile, as of November 2020, was estimated at 160,000 metric tonnes of crystalline sugar powder, worth about US$45 million. The country is now looking at regional markets, including Burundi, Democratic Republic of the Congo, South Sudan, Ethiopia and Zambia.

In 2022, national sugar production was estimated at 600,000 metric tonnes annually, with national consumption of about 380,000 metric tonnes. That left approximately 220,000 metric tonnes available for export, annually. In October 2022, it was projected that the country would produce 822,000 metric tonnes in calendar year 2022. About 720,000 metric tonnes of that, would be brown table sugar and about 102,000 metric tonnes would be white industrial sugar.

== See also ==
- Alam Group
- Madhvani Group
- Mehta Group
- Sarrai Group
- Tirupati Development Uganda Limited
- Economy of Uganda
- Sugar production in Uganda
