= Sugar & Allied Industries Limited =

Sugar manufacturer in Uganda

Coordinates: 00°56′48″N 33°29′13″E

- Company type: Private
- Industry: Manufacture & Marketing of Sugar
- Founded: 2011; 15 years ago
- Headquarters: Kaliro District, Uganda
- Key people: Ashish Monpara (Director); Ishan Patel (Director); Rajan Patel (Director)
- Products: Sugar
- Number of employees: 1,500+ (2025)
- Website: Homepage

Sugar & Allied Industries Limited (SAIL), also referred to as Kaliro Sugar Limited is a sugar manufacturer in Uganda. As of August 2025, the factory crushed 2,500 tons of raw cane per day, producing 78,000 tons of sugar annually and employed 1,500 people directly.

== Overview ==
SAIL sits on approximately 5,000 acres (20 km^{2}) of land owned by the factory owners; Modern Group, under sugar cane cultivation. The company also has 4,000 registered out-growers who collectively have 25,000 acres (10,000 ha) under sugar cane farming. SAIL is the fourth-largest manufacturer of sugar in Uganda, producing an estimated 60,000 metric tonnes annually in 2013, accounting for approximately 14% of national output. Kakira Sugar Works, located in Kakira, Jinja District, is the nation's largest sugar producer, accounting for approximately 40% of national output. Kinyara Sugar Works (KSW), in Kinyara, Masindi District, is the second-largest producer of sugar in the country, accounting for about 27% of national output. Sugar Corporation of Uganda Limited (SCOUL), located in Lugazi, Buikwe District, produces about 14% of total national output. The remaining 6% is produced by Sango Bay Estates Limited, located in Kakuuto, Rakai District, Central Uganda. The estimated 450,000 metric tonnes of sugar produced by the five leading sugar manufacturers in Uganda is marketed to the Eastern African countries of Burundi, Democratic Republic of the Congo, Kenya, Rwanda, South Sudan, Tanzania and Uganda.

== Location ==
Kaliro Sugar Limited is located in Bwayuya Village, Namugongo sub-county, Kaliro District, Eastern Uganda, near the town of Kaliro. This location is approximately 160 kilometres (99 mi), by road, northeast of Kampala, the capital of Uganda and the largest city in that country. The estimated coordinates of Kaliro Sugar Limited are 0°56'48.0"N, 33°29'13.0"E (Latitude:0.946660; 33.486936).

== History ==
The sugar estate was founded in 2011. From 2011 until 2013, the owners planted sugar cane on 5,000 acres (2,000 ha) on the land adjacent to the factory. They also recruited and put under contract, an estimated 4,000 out-growers with an estimated 25,000 acres (10,000 ha), under sugar cane cultivation. The factory started crushing cane in June 2013, producing about 200 metric tonnes daily, translating into about 60,000 metric tonnes annually. By August 2025, annual sugar output had increased to 78,000 tons annually, with plans to gradually increase output to 230,000 tons of sugar over medium to long term.

== Ownership ==
Sugar and Allied Industries Limited is a privately owned company. It is a 100 percent subsidiary of the Modern Group, a Dubai-based conglomerate, with subsidiaries in other East African countries (Kenya, Tanzania, Rwanda and DR Congo).

== Memberships ==
SAIL is a member of Uganda Sugar Manufacturers' Association (USMA), an industry group of leading sugar manufacturers in the county.

== Co-generation ==
SAIL owns and operates Kaliro Power Station, a bagasse-fired thermal power station, that is incorporated in the SAIL sugar factory. The power plant generates 12MW of power, of which 3MW are used internally by SAIL and 9MW are sold to Uganda's national electric grid.

== See also ==
- Economy of Uganda
- List of sugar manufacturers in Uganda
- List of conglomerates in Uganda
