= Sugar industry in Uganda =

Uganda is the largest producer of granular brown sugar in the East African Community, accounting for about 500,000 metric tonnes annually as of May 2017. By 2021, national annual sugar output had increased to about 600,000 metric tonnes of brown sugar and 60,000 metric tonnes of industrial sugar. In October 2022, it was projected that the country would produce 822,000 metric tonnes in 2022. Of that, about 720,000 metric tonnes would be brown table sugar and about 102,000 metric tonnes would be white industrial sugar.

== History ==
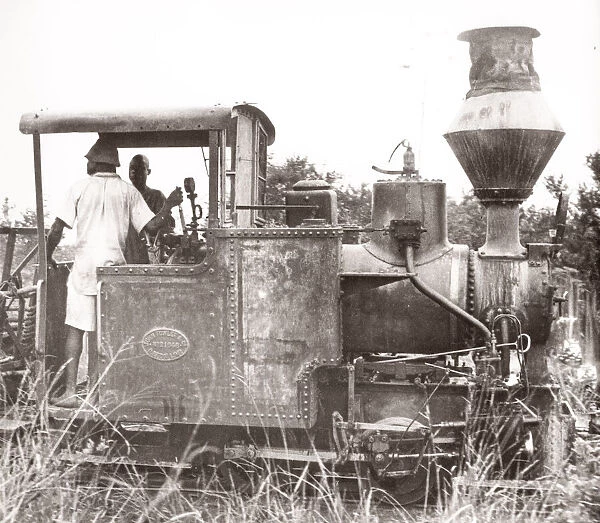
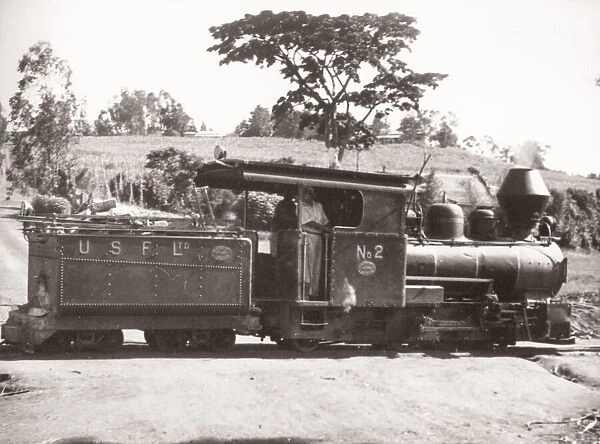
Steam locomotives of the Uganda Sugar Factory Ltd, ca 1943

In 1920, the Vithaldas Haridas & Company (VHC) was under the management of Muljibhai Madhvani, a 26-year-old Indian-born Ugandan businessman, entrepreneur, industrialist and philanthropist. VHC purchased 800 acres (324 ha) of land in Kakira, between Jinja and Iganga, for the purpose of starting a sugar factory. Madhvani later became the managing director of VHC. In 1930, that sugar complex opened, later renamed the Kakira Sugar Works.

In 1924, under the stewardship of Nanji Kalidas Mehta, another industrialist of Indian descent, Sugar Corporation of Uganda Limited (SCOUL) was founded as Uganda Sugar Factory at Lugazi. This marked the beginning of the Mehta Group, with headquarters in India and businesses in Sub-Saharan Africa and on the Indian sub-continent.

== 21st century ==
Until September 2011 Kinyara Sugar Works Limited (KSWL), Uganda's second-largest sugar factory, was majority owned by the Central Government of Uganda. Since then, the majority shares in the business have been owned by the Rai Group, domiciled in Mauritius. As of September 2011, the shareholding in KSWL was as illustrated in the table below:

Kinyara Sugar Works stock ownership
Rank	Name of owner	Percentage ownership
1	Rai Group of Mauritius*	70.00
2	Omukama of Bunyoro	10.00
3	KSWL employees	10.00
4	KSWL outgrowers	10.00
	Total	100.00

- Note: In Uganda the Rai Group of Mauritius has transformed into the Sarrai Group of Uganda.

Following a drought that adversely affected the water levels of Lake Victoria, which ended around 2011 or 2012, two misconceptions arose in Kenya's political and industrial circles: (a) Uganda was incapable of growing enough raw cane for domestic consumption and (b) any claim by Uganda that it had a sugar surplus was based on the fact that Brazilian sugar barons were dumping sugar on the Ugandan (and Kenyan) markets.

Starting in 2013, a more reasoned approach by both governments, allowed the development of a verifiable, inter-government database showing Uganda's production, consumption and export data.

=== Expansion ===
In 2016, construction began on a new sugar factory in Gem Village, Pachilo Parish, Atiak sub-county, Kilak County, in Amuru District, in the Northern Region of Uganda. Known as Atiak Sugar Factory, it has capacity to crush 1,650 tonnes (1,650,000 kg) of raw cane daily, producing 66,000 tonnes (66,000,000 kg) of powder sugar annually.

In 2017, the stakeholders for the Madhvani Group reached consensus to lease 10,000 acres (40 km^{2}) of land in the villages of Kololo, Lakang, Bana, Omee, Lujoro, Lwak Obito and Pailyech in Amuru Sub-county, Amuru District in order to establish Amuru Sugar Works.

In March 2020, a delegation of Tanzanian government officials visited Uganda, to ascertain the country's ability to manufacture sugar and its ability to generate surplus for export. After touring Uganda's four largest sugar factories, the delegation, led by the Tanzanian Minister of Agriculture, Japhet Hasunga, agreed to place an initial order of 30,000 metric tonnes, the first order in nearly two years. As of May 2020, Uganda's annual sugar output, by the 11 largest manufacturers, was estimated at 510,000 metric tonnes. With Uganda's annual sugar consumption of 360,000 metric tonnes, approximately 150,000 metric tonnes were available for export.

In 2022, most of Uganda's surplus sugar was marketed to South Sudan, the Democratic Republic of the Congo and a new market in western Ethiopia. That year, the Ugandan Ministry of Trade, Industry and Cooperatives estimated annual national sugar production at "greater than 600,000 metric tonnes".

National annual output, marketable surplus & strategic reserve in Uganda (in metric tonnes)
Calendar year	National production	National consumption	National export	To strategic reserve
2014	400,499.05	342,325.14	84,603.30	26,429.29
2015	396,315.95	329,896.00	49,810.55	16,604.40
2016	475,000.00	350,000.00	23,899.50	107,704.90
2017	365,452.00	360,000.00		5,452.00
2018	450,000.00	360,000.00		90,000.00
2019	500,000.00	350,000.00	90,000.00	60,000.00
2020	510,000.00	360,000.00	130,000.00	20,000.00
2021	600,000.00	380,000.00		220,000.00
2022	822,000.00	380,000	442,000.00	

== White industrial sugar ==
In 2022, Kinyara Sugar started manufacturing "industrial sugar" for use in breweries, soft beverage production and in bakeries and confectioneries. The initial production capacity was 60,000 metric tonnes annually. In 2023 that capacity was increased to 75,000 metric tonnes annually. That brought the national production of white industrial sugar to over 120,000 metric tonnes annually. Other manufactures of industrial sugar in the country include GM Sugar Uganda Limited and Mayuge Sugar Industries Limited.

== See also ==
- List of sugar manufacturers in Uganda
