= Iganga–Kaliro–Pallisa Road =

Road in Uganda

Route information
- Length: 49 mi (79 km)

Major junctions
- South end: Iganga
- Kaliro
- North end: Pallisa

Location
- Country: Uganda

Highway system
- Roads in Uganda

Iganga–Kaliro–Pallisa Road is a road in the Eastern Region of Uganda, connecting the towns of Iganga in Iganga District to Kaliro in Kaliro District and Pallisa in Pallisa District.

== Overview ==
The road starts at Iganga, goes through Kaliro, and ends at Pallisa, a distance of about 79 kilometres (49 mi).

The Iganga–Kaliro section of the road, measuring about 35 kilometres (22 mi), is bitumen-surfaced, in varying stages of disrepair. In February 2014, the president of Uganda indicated that government had plans to upgrade this road section to class 2 bituminous surface. In December 2014, this road section appeared on the list of upcoming national road projects released by the Uganda National Roads Authority (UNRA). The gravel-surfaced Kaliro–Pallisa section of this road is about 45 kilometres (28 mi) long.

== See also ==
- List of roads in Uganda
