= Alam Group =

ALAM GROUP
- Company type: Private conglomerate
- Industry: Investments
- Founded: 1965
- Headquarters: Kampala, Uganda
- Key people: Manzur Alam (Chairman); Abid Alam (Group Managing Director)
- Products: Agriculture; Aluminium; Electricity generation; Manufacturing; Real Estate; Steel; Sugar Manufacture
- Number of employees: 3,000+ (2013)
- Website: alam-group.com

The Alam Group of Companies, commonly referred to as the Alam Group, is a privately owned conglomerate in Uganda. The group has business interests in Uganda, Kenya, and Rwanda.

== History ==
The Alam Group was founded by Manzur Alam in 1965. Alam built upon the foundations established by his father, Mehbub Alam, a civil engineer who worked closely with the Buganda government and local governments. Mehbub Alam's projects included the construction of Kigo Prison and Nakivubo Channel.

In 2019, the Group announced the construction of a new sugar factory in Kassanda district, Uganda. The factory was expected to begin production in 2021.

== Corporate affairs ==
=== Management ===
The Alam Group is led by its founder and current chairman Manzur Alam.

=== Offices and employees ===
The Alam Group is headquartered and runs the majority of companies in Uganda, where it directly employs over 3,000 people. It also maintains subsidiary companies in the neighboring countries of Kenya and Rwanda.

=== Business areas ===
The Group is involved in steel manufacture, aluminium processing, agricultural implements, footwear, sugar manufacture, electricity generation, floriculture, real estate development and management, tourist lodges and motels and the manufacture of liquid petroleum gas, among other investments.

=== Subsidiary companies ===
The companies of Alam Group include but are not limited to the following:

- Rolling Steel Mills – Jinja, Uganda
- Saimmco Limited – Soroti, Uganda.
- Sugar & Allied Industries Limited – Kaliro, Uganda
- Kaliro Power Station – Kaliro, Uganda
- Crocodile Tool Company Limited – Jinja, Uganda
- Alam Property Limited – Kampala, Uganda
- Rhino Footwear Limited – Kampala, Uganda
- Casements Africa Limited – Kampala, Uganda
- Roofclad Limited – Kampala, Uganda
- Oxygas Limited – Kampala, Uganda
- Kenya United Steel Company Limited (KUSCO) – Mombasa, Kenya
- Casements Africa Rwanda Limited – Kigali, Rwanda
- Geo Lodges Limited – Kampala, Uganda
- Ama Ply Limited – Kampala, Uganda
- Ekono Homes Limited – Kampala, Uganda

== See also ==
- Uganda Conglomerates
- Africa Conglomerates
- UG Sugar Factories
- UG Power Stations
