= Kaliro Thermal Power Station =

Thermal power station in Uganda

Kaliro Power Station
- Country: Uganda
- Location: Buwaya Village, Kaliro District
- Coordinates: 00°56′50″N 33°29′13″E
- Status: Operational
- Commission date: 2014
- Owner: Sugar & Allied Industries Limited

Thermal power station
- Primary fuel: Bagasse
- Cogeneration?: Yes

Power generation
- Units operational: 1 x 12 MW
- Nameplate capacity: 12 MW (16,000 hp)

Kaliro Power Station is a 12 MW (16,000 hp) bagasse-fired thermal power plant in Uganda, the third-largest economy in the East African Community.

== Location ==
The power station is located on the campus of Sugar & Allied Industries Limited, the owners of the power station. This location lies in the village of Buwaya, about 7 kilometres (4 mi) northwest of the town of Kaliro, in Kaliro District, Eastern Uganda. This about 42 kilometres (26 mi) north of Iganga, the nearest large town. Kaliro Power Station lies about 156 kilometres (97 mi) northeast of Kampala, the capital and largest city in the country. The coordinates of the power station are 0°56'50.0"N, 33°29'13.0"E (Latitude:0.947217; Longitude:33.486939).

== Overview ==
Kaliro Power Station is owned and operated by Sugar & Allied Industries Limited (SAIL), the third-largest sugar manufacturer in Uganda. The power station was designed and built around the sugar manufacturing plant of SAIL. The fibrous residue from the process of crushing sugar cane, known as bagasse, is burnt to heat water in boilers and produce steam. The steam is pressurized and used to drive turbines which then generate electricity. The excess heat is used in the sugar manufacturing process. As of July 2014, the power station was capable of producing a maximum of 12MW of electricity, 5MW of which was utilized internally by SAIL. The remaining 7MW is sold to the national electricity grid. The plant is expandable to a maximum capacity of 22MW. Both SAIL and Kaliro Power Station are subsidiaries and member companies of the Alam Group, a multimillion-dollar conglomerate based in Uganda with subsidiaries in Kenya and Rwanda.

== Licensure ==
In October 2014, the Electricity Regulatory Authority issued a power production license to Kaliro Power Station for 11.9MW.

== See also ==
- Kaliro
- Kaliro District
- SAIL
- Alam Group
- Uganda Power Stations
