= Muwanga =

Muwanga is an Ugandan surname. Notable people with the surname include:

- Bulaimu Muwanga Kibirige, Ugandan businessman
- Christopher Henry Muwanga Barlow (1929–2006), Ugandan poet
- Martin Muwanga (born 1983), Ugandan football striker
- Paulo Muwanga (c. 1921–1991), Ugandan politician
