= Uganda Sugar Manufacturers' Association =

Trade organisation in Uganda

Coordinates: 00°19′01″N 32°36′16″E

- Abbreviation: USMA
- Formation: 1995; 31 years ago
- Type: Trade and Industry association
- Purpose: Sugar manufacture and distribution in Uganda
- Headquarters: 133/135 Sixth Street, Industrial Area, Kampala
- Region served: Uganda
- Official language: English
- Chairman: Mwine Jim Kabeho
- Vice Chairman: P. Ramadasan
- Affiliations: International Sugar Organization
- Website: Homepage

The Uganda Sugar Manufacturers' Association (USMA), is a registered, professional organization that brings together four large sugar manufacturers in Uganda. The association aims at promoting sustainable, profitable manufacture of sugar and related products, in a sustainable, environmentally friendly fashion, for the economic development of the industry, employees and country. USMA represents Uganda in matters related to the International Sugar Organization.

== Location ==
The association maintains its headquarters at 133-135 Sixth Street, in the Industrial Area of Kampala, Uganda's capital and largest city. The geographical coordinates of the headquarters of USMA are:0°19'01.0"N, 32°36'16.0"E (Latitude:0.316944; Longitude:32.604444).

== Overview ==
The members of USMA are: (a) Kakira Sugar Works (b) Kinyara Sugar Works Limited (c) Sugar Corporation of Uganda Limited and (d) Sango Bay Estates Limited. According to USMA, sugar production in Uganda in the calendar year 2014, is as illustrated in the table below.

Sugar Production In Uganda In 2014
Rank	Name of Producer	Metric Tonnes	Percentage of Total
1	Kakira Sugar Works	180,000	41.06
2	Kinyara Sugar Works Limited	120,360	27.46
3	Sugar Corporation of Uganda Limited	73,500	16.77
4	Others	64,500	14.71
	Total	438,360	100.00

In 2011, eight new sugar manufactures were issued licenses, bringing the total to 15 in the country then. This led to friction between the new entrants and the established large producers who belong to USMA.

== Governance ==
USMA is governed by a five person board of directors.

- Mwine Jim Kabeho (Kakira Sugar Works): Chairman
- P. Ramadasan (Kinyara Sugar Works Limited): Vice Chairman
- D. N. Mishra (Sugar Corporation of Uganda Limited): Member
- Christian Vincke (Kakira Sugar Works): Member
- Assistant Commissioner of Trade, MTIC (Government Representative): Member

== See also ==
- Sugar production in Uganda
- List of sugar manufacturers in Uganda
