= List of conglomerates in Uganda =

This is a list of conglomerates in Uganda.

#	Name	Headquarters	Nature or name of business
1	Alam Group	Kampala	Sugar & Allied Industries Limited, Steel Rolling Mills Limited, Saimmco Limited, Crocodile Tool Company, Alam Property Limited, Rhino Footwear Limited, Casements Africa Limited, Roofclad Limited, Uganda Oxygas Limited, Kaliro Power Station
2	Aya Group	Kampala	hotels, flour milling, transportation, international trade, bakery, mining
3	BMK Group	Kampala	hotels, real estate, motorcycle sales, construction machinery leasing
4	DFCU Group	Kampala	banking, leasing, real estate, investments
5	Ham Group	Kampala	Real Estate, manufacturing, agribusiness, banking, Internet Information Technology, Finance, Education, Construction, Sports, Clothing, Logistics and Transportation, General Merchandise
6	International Medical Group	Kampala	hospitals, medical services, universities, medical insurance
7	Madhvani Group	Kakira	manufacturing, agribusiness, electricity generation, hotels & resorts, construction, insurance, security guards, aircraft maintenance, IT applications, tourism, packaging.
8	Mara Group	Nakasero	real estate, information technology, mass media, hospitality, packaging, finance, banking
9	Mukwano Group	Kampala	manufacturing, agribusiness, banking
10	New Vision Group	Kampala	publishing, printing, broadcasting
11	Ruparelia Group	Kampala	hotels & resorts, schools, Victoria University, agribusiness, insurance, floriculture, real estate, investments.
12	Simba Group	Kampala	telecommunications, hotels & resorts, broadcasting, real estate, insurance, floriculture, electricity generation, investments
13	Tirupati Development Uganda Limited	Kampala	construction, real estate, agribusiness, shopping malls, investments
14	Wavah Group	Kampala	broadcasting, beverages, automobile dealerships, real estate, insurance, investments, textiles
15	Mulwana Group	Kampala	manufacturing, batteries, plastics, dairy farming, milk processing, horticulture, real estate, investments

== See also ==
- List of conglomerates
- List of conglomerates in Africa
- List of companies based in Uganda
