= List of steel manufacturers in Uganda =

This is a list of steel manufacturers in Uganda:

- MPower Steel Company Limited - Kampala District, Mukono, Uganda
- Roofing Rolling Mills Limited - Namanve Industrial Park, Kira Municipality, Wakiso District
- Roofings Limited - Lubowa, Wakiso District
- IBM Steel Building Material Suppliers - Kampala - Kampala District - Kampala - Uganda
- IBM Steel Metal Material Suppliers - Kampala - Kampala District - Kampala - Uganda
- Yogi Steels Limited - Njeru - Buikwe District - Jinja - Uganda
- Mayuge Sugar Industries Ltd – Steel Division - Buikwe District - Jinja - Uganda
- Pramukh Steel Limited - Njeru - Buikwe District - Jinja - Uganda
- Steel Rolling Mills Uganda Limited - Member of the Alam Group - Jinja, Jinja District
- Steel and Tube Industries Uganda Limited - Kampala
- Tembo Steel Mills (Uganda) Limited - Jinja, Jinja District
- Uganda Baati Limited - Kampala, Tororo & Arua
- MM Integrated Steel Mills (Uganda) Limited - Jinja, Jinja District
- China Machine Building International Corporation Mbarara, Mbarara District
- Madhvani group limited steel division

== See also ==
- History of the steel industry (1970–present)
- List of steel producers
