= Bugiri Sugar Factory =

Sugar factory in Uganda

Coordinates: 00°33′15″N 33°47′29″E

Bugiri Sugar Company Limited
- Type: Private
- Founded: 2010
- Headquarters: Bugiri District, Uganda
- Products: Ethanol

Bugiri Sugar Company Limited, is a sugar manufacturing company in Uganda.

== Location ==
The main factories of the company are under construction in Bugubo Village, Kapyanga Sub-county, Bugiri District, approximately 6 kilometres (4 mi) by road, southeast of the town of Bugiri.

This location is approximately 77 kilometres (48 mi), by road, north-east of Jinja, the largest city in the Busoga sub-region. Bugubo Village is located approximately 157 kilometres (98 mi), by road, northeast of Kampala, the capital and largest city of Uganda.

== Overview ==
Bugiri Sugar Factory is a new manufacturer of sugar in Uganda. As of May 2021, the factory is under construction, on a 60 acres (24 ha) piece of real estate in Bugubo Village. With no sizable nucleus plantation of its own, the factory expects to source sugarcane primarily from out growers in the district and sub-region.

The new factory expects to begin commercial production in December 2021. When fully operational, the factory expects to produce 4,800 bags of 50 kilograms (110 lb) each, of crystalline sugar, at maximum capacity. In May 2021, the Daily Monitor reported that Bugiri Sugar Factory plans to focus on production of industrial sugar and industrial ethanol.

== History ==
As of May 2021, Uganda had five major sugar manufacturers, namely (a) GM Sugar Uganda Limited (b) Kakira Sugar Works (c) Kinyara Sugar Works Limited (d) Sango Bay Estates Limited and Sugar Corporation of Uganda Limited. Starting in 2011, a plethora of smaller sugar manufacturers began to acquire manufacturing licenses, so that by 2021, these smaller manufacturers number about 20. The majority of them are located in Busoga.

As it turns out, many of the smaller outfits are owned by one or another of the big five manufacturers. Out grower farmers find it difficult to sell their cane profitably because of collusion between the large manufacturers and their subsidiary smaller outfits.

Bugiri Sugar Factory is expected to offer some relief to out grower farmers because (a) it has no nucleus farm of its own (b) it has no subsidiary factory to collude with and (c) out grower farmers are the main source of raw sugarcane.

== Ownership ==
As of May 2021, the shareholding in Bugiri Sugar Factory is private and not widely publicly known.

== See also ==
- List of sugar manufacturers in Uganda
- List of power stations in Uganda
