= List of cement manufacturers in Rwanda =

This is a list of companies that manufacture cement in Rwanda.

- Cimerwa Cement Limited
- Kigali Cement Company
- Prime Cement Limited
- Anjia Cement Limited

== Production ==
As of February 2018, Rwanda's cement needs were reported to amount to about 50,000 metric tonnes every month. At that time, the established factories in Rwanda were able to produce enough cement to meet approximately 54 percent of the national cement needs (27 metric tonnes monthly), leaving 46 percent (23 metric tonnes, every month), to be imported from regional manufacturers. Among the regional manufacturers that supply cement to Rwanda are Hima Cement Limited of Uganda, Dangote Industries Tanzania, Lake Cement Tanzania, and Tanga Cement of Tanzania.

As of December 2022, national cement demand had increased to approximately 950,000 tonnes annually, with national annual production estimated at 480,000 tonnes. By August 2023, national output had increased to 600,000 metric tonnes, which was about 50 percent of national demand. The commissioning of Anjia Cement Limited in August 2023, with planned annual production of 1,000,000 tonnes, was expected to bridge that gap.

== See also ==
- List of cement manufacturers in Uganda
- List of companies and cities in Africa that manufacture cement
