= Miraj Barot =

Ugandan businessman

- Born: 1988 (age 37–38); India
- Occupation: Business executive
- Years active: 2003–present
- Title: Managing director & CEO
- Spouse: Kruti Miraj Barot
- Parent(s): Harshad Barot & Parul Barot

Miraj Harshad Barot is a business executive. He was born in India and moved to Uganda with his family when he was 6 years old. He is currently the joint managing director and chief executive officer of Tirupati Group of companies in Uganda. The group ventures include shopping malls, housing estates, apartments, business parks and hospitals.

== Early life and education ==
Barot was born in India in 1988. His father is Harshad Barot, the founder and chairman of Tirupati Group Limited. The family migrated to Uganda, in 1994, when Miraj was still a toddler. He attended schools in Uganda but dropped out early. He began participating in the running of the family business empire, in 2003, at age 14.

== Career ==
Starting in 2006, Barot has been involved in running the family businesses. When TGL was formed in 2006, he invested some of personal wealth into the company and served as its first Marketing Director. Later, he served as the co-chief executive officer of TGL. In November 2013, his role became chief executive officer at Tirupati and at two other companies in the expanding family-owned conglomerate. Virat Alloys Limited is a steel manufacturing and metal fabrication company, having acquired the assets and stock of the former Sembule Steel Mills. Barot was the managing director and chief executive officer of all the two companies.

== Family ==
Barot is married to Kruti Bharat Rao. The wedding took place on 11 December 2013 in India. When the couple returned to Uganda, they threw a lavish reception at Kampala Serena Hotel, on 10 January 2014, for their upscale friends and associates.

== Awards ==
- The investor of the year awards by Uganda Investment Authority in 2009 for introduction of a novel and a competitive product in the East African Region
- The investor of the year awards by Uganda Investment Authority in 2010 for innovative idea for the first medical waste plant in Uganda
- The investor of the year awards by Uganda Investment Authority in 2012 for Young Entrepreneur of the year.
- Africa leadership award winner in 2014
- Glory of Gujarat award by Governor of Gujarat Honorable Om Prakash Kohli in 2015
- Naming of a Road in Kampala Uganda MIRAJ CLOSE for contributing to the development of the community and Uganda at large in 2020
- Business trendsetter Award 2023 at Sheraton Hotel Kampala received from Permanent Secretary & Secretary to The Treasury in the Ministry of Finance, Planning and Economic Development, Ramathan Ggoobi

== See also ==
- TDUL
- African Millionaires
