= SIMPLE Group =

SIMPLE Group Limited
- Type: Private (Limited liability)
- Industry: Offshore business
- Founded: 1999; 27 years ago in Gibraltar
- Headquarters: Gibraltar, Gibraltar
- Key people: Stephen Kurphy (CEO)
- Products: Tax planning, consultancy, offshore business
- Number of employees: Undisclosed
- Website: www.simplegroup.com

SIMPLE Group is a Gibraltar registered conglomeration of separately run companies that each has its core purpose of tax planning or tax avoidance. The core business areas are legal services, fiduciary activities, offshore banking, offshore outsourcing, corporate services and offshore business services.

Each of the companies operating under the SIMPLE Group umbrella is independent; most are majority owned by SIMPLE Group, while previous owners still hold minority stakes. Occasionally, the group licenses the SIMPLE brand to a company that has purchased a division or service from it.

SIMPLE Group Limited is a privately held conglomerate. It is not listed on any stock exchange, and the group is owned through a complex series of offshore trusts and companies in order to protect the owners. The Sunday Times stated that SIMPLE Group's interests could be valued at £77 million; the shareholders are understood to be a group of owners of Swiss private banks.

== History ==
The date of incorporation is listed as 1999 by Companies House of Gibraltar, which classes it as a holding company; however, SIMPLE Group's business and trading activities are understood to date to the latter part of the 90s, probably as an incorporated body.

With a few exceptions, the companies did not begin as wholly owned subsidiaries of SIMPLE Group but were instead acquired from various previous owners.

== Brands (under various ownership) ==
- Chaplin, Bénédicte & co. — This is SIMPLE Group's Flagship Brand. Owned Chaplin, Bénédicte & co. is a Legal Services Firm specialised in Tax Planning and Offshore Law. The firm is based in the City of London, United Kingdom with satellite representation in Riga, Latvia and Victoria, Seychelles.
- FBS Banking PLC — Offshore Banking Operations. FBS Banking was acquired by SIMPLE Group in 2001 for an undisclosed amount after a fierce battle with the Royal Bank of Scotland Group. FBS Banking is registered in Seychelles and operate from Latvia and England. They are in fact Agents of offshore or investments banks, mostly in Switzerland, Monaco and the Channel Island.
- Link The World Limited — Professional Due Diligence consultants for the Fiduciary industry. Link The World was one of the first company acquired by SIMPLE Group but is the least profitable of them as no recorded profits were ever reported on their Financial Statements.
- SIMPLE Business Services — Outsourcing business fully owned by SIMPLE Group, SIMPLE Business Services cater for subcontracting services from the Baltic States in East Europe.
- Fresh Offshore — Low cost offshore companies incorporation and management. The Brand were bought from Swiss giant UBS in 2007 but SIMPLE Group never started trading under this name.
