= Prime Cement Limited =

Cement manufacturing company in Rwanda

Coordinates: 1.49309°S 29.66028°E

- Company type: Private
- Industry: Manufacturer and distributor of cement
- Founded: 2017
- Headquarters: Musanze Industrial Zone, Kimonyi Sector, Musanze District, Rwanda
- Key people: Eric Rutabana; Managing Director & Chief Executive Officer
- Products: Cement
- Number of employees: 300+ (2020)

Prime Cement Limited (PCL) is a cement manufacturer in Rwanda. It is a subsidiary of Milbridge Holding SA, a building materials manufacturer and distributor, with subsidiaries in Angola, the United Arab Emirates, Rwanda and South Africa.

== Location ==
The main factories of PCL are located in Musanze Industrial Zone, in Kimonyi Sector, Musanze District, in the Northern Province of Rwanda. This is approximately 97 kilometres (60 mi), by road, northwest of Kigali, the capital and largest city in that country.

== Overview ==
In 2018, PCL started construction of a new US$65 million cement factory in Musanze District, in Rwanda's Northern Region. The plant would to be built in two phases of capacity of 600,000 metric tonnes each. The first phase, built at a cost of US$40 million (approx. RWF:37 billion) came online in August 2020. LOESCHE GmbH, a German engineering company based in Düsseldorf, supplied the equipment and constructed the factory. Commercial production began on 1 September 2020.

== Ownership ==
PCL is a 100 percent subsidiary of Milbridge Holding SA, a buildings material conglomerate, based in Angola, with subsidiaries in South Africa, United Arab Emirates and Rwanda.

== Future plans ==
It is expected that when the new plant's first phase is fully functional, it will employ 300 workers. Later, when the second phase is built, another 300 staff would be hired, to make a staff complement of 600.

When the second phase of PCL is completed, Rwanda's national cement output is expected to rise to 1.9 million metric tonnes annually. The cement produced will be utilized locally, with the surplus exported regionally.

== See also ==
- List of cement manufacturers in Rwanda
