= Jaka Singgih =

Indonesian businessman and politician

Jaka Aryadipa Singgih
- Born: 10 July 1958 (age 68); Medan, North Sumatera, Indonesia
- Education: University of Plymouth, University of Hull, Harvard University, Harvard Business School, London Business School
- Occupations: Businessman and politician
- Political party: Indonesian Democratic Party of Struggle
- Spouse: Sally Singgih
- Children: Jay Aryaputra Singgih
- Parent: Arya Johan Singgih

Jaka Aryadipa Singgih (born 10 July 1958) is an Indonesian businessman and politician. He is the CEO and managing director of the Bumi Laut Group and served as a member of parliament of the Republic of Indonesia from the Indonesian Democratic Party of Struggle.

== Early life and family ==
Jaka Aryadipa Singgih was born on 10 July 1958 in Medan, North Sumatera, Indonesia.

His father, Arya Johan Singgih, is the second generation of business owners in the Bumi Laut Group and is the chairman of the Group; and an Honorary Member of the Retired Indonesian Armed Forces Foundation (PEPABRI).

His father-in-law, Chanan S. Shergill, was a War Veteran for the Independence of the Republic of Indonesia, Member of the Veterans' Legion of the Republic of Indonesia (Legiun Veteran Republik Indonesia) and Member of the Retired Indonesian Armed Forces Foundation (PEPABRI).

== Education ==
He received his Postgraduate Diploma in Strategic Marketing, General Management and Maritime Studies from the School of Maritime Studies of the University of Plymouth and received his MBA from the University of Hull, United Kingdom.

He is also an alumnus of Harvard University, Harvard Business School and the London Business School through its executive education programmes.

== Political office ==
He was elected to the Indonesian Parliament as a Member of the People's Consultative Assembly of the Republic of Indonesia (MPR-RI) representing the province of Jambi, Sumatera from 1999 to 2004. He was reelected for his second term in Parliament as a Member of the People's Representative Council of the Republic of Indonesia (DPR-RI) representing the province of Riau Islands, Sumatera from 2004 to 2009 from the Indonesian Democratic Party of Struggle.

== Career ==
He is the third generation of business owners in the Bumi Laut Group and is the CEO and managing director of the Group.

== Other positions ==
He sits on the board of advisors for The Mercantile Athletic Club Jakarta, as well as for The Financial Club Jakarta.
