= Beijing Enterprises =

Chinese investment company

Beijing Enterprises Limited 北京控股有限公司

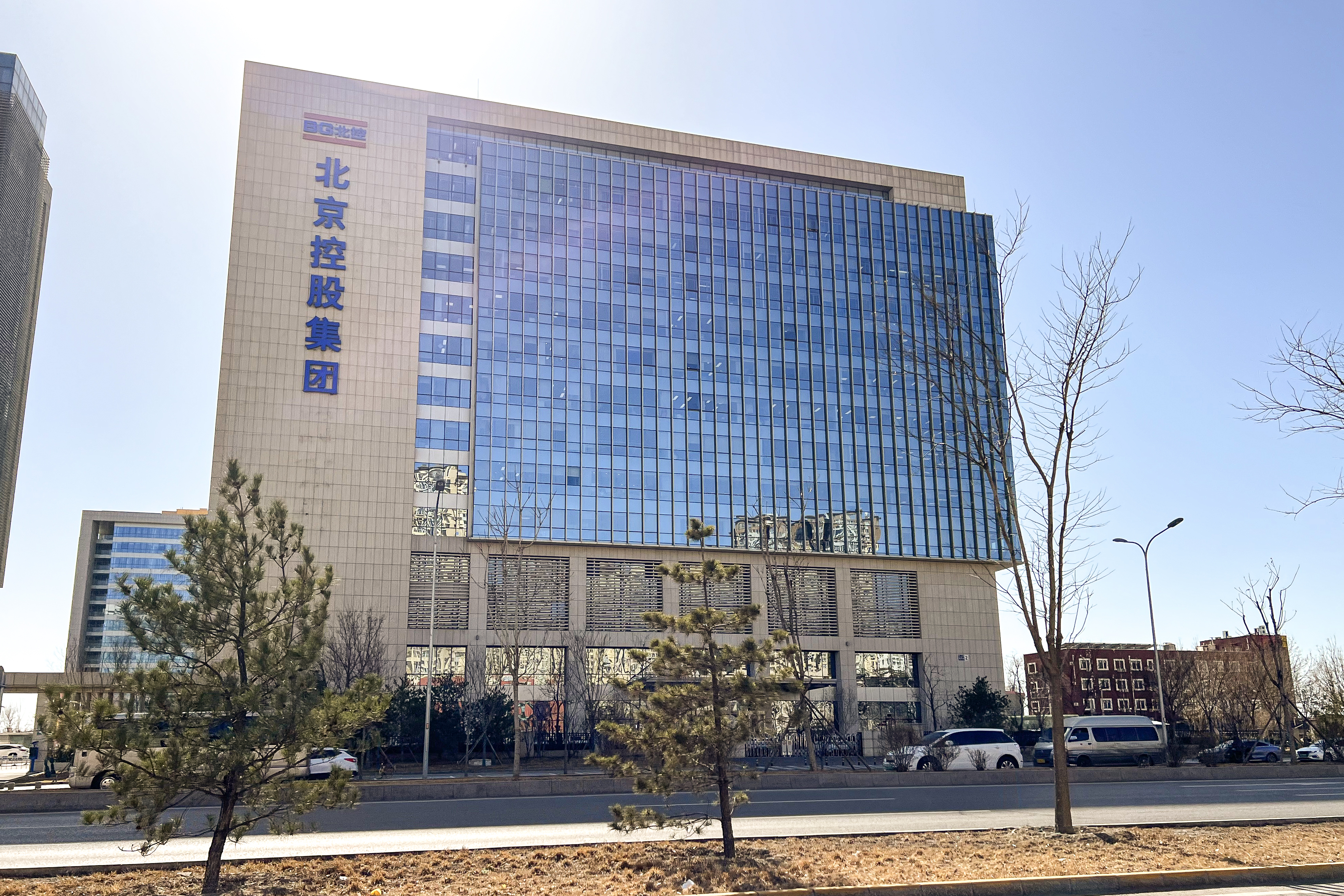
- Headquarters in Beijing
- Type: State-owned enterprise (Red chip)
- Industry: Conglomerate
- Founded: 1997; 29 years ago
- Headquarters: Hong Kong, China
- Area served: People's Republic of China
- Key people: Chairman: Mr. Yi Xiqun
- Website: Official website archive

Beijing Enterprises Holdings Limited (SEHK: 392) is a Chinese investment company that was formed with eight units of assets (i.e. Yanjing Beer, Sanyuan Foods, Beijing Western Style Food, Beijing Airport Expressway, Badaling Tourism, Wangfujing Department Store, Jianguo Hotel, Beijing International Switching System) in Beijing, China.

== History ==
It was incorporated in Hong Kong and listed on the Hong Kong Stock Exchange as red chip stock in 1997. On February 5, 2016, BEHL acquired all shares of EEW Holding GmbH ("EEW") and a 6% interest in M+E Holding GMBH & Co. KG, a German waste energy utilization company, from EQT Infrastructure II, a Swedish fund company, at a cost of EUR1,438 million (approximately HK$12.5 billion).

On 9 November 2016 BEHL acquired a 20% stake in Verkhnechonskneftegaz, the oil and gas development arm of Rosneft, which holds a license to develop the Verkhnechonsk oil and gas field in the Russian Federation, at a cost of US$1.1 billion.
