= Yi Xiqun =

Chinese entrepreneur (born 1947)

- Born: August 1947 (age 79)
- Education: Tsinghua University
- Occupation: Entrepreneur

Yi Xiqun (Simplified Chinese: 衣锡群; born 1947) is a Chinese entrepreneur.

== Career ==
From 1986 to 1987, Yi was in charge of the Beijing Municipal Government Economic Structure Reform Committee, and from 1987 to 1991, he was head of the Xicheng District in Beijing. He has served as the chairman of Beijing Enterprises Holdings, assistant to the mayor of Beijing and director of the Economic and Foreign Trade Commission of Beijing Municipality and the Management Committee of the Beijing Economic and Technology Development Area. He joined the Beijing Enterprises Holdings in 1999. He was eventually appointed as Chairman of Beijing Enterprises Holdings in 2003. Under his leadership as chairman, Beijing Enterprises Holdings underwent a large-scale restructuring and successful turnaround from 2003 to 2009. During those years, the stock returned 32.3% per annum (33.7% including dividends), driven by operational improvements, bolt-on acquisitions and sale of non-core assets.

He has been an independent non-executive director of SOHO China since 2007, an independent non-executive director at Asian Capital Holdings since 2010, and independent non-executive director of Industrial and Commercial Bank of China since 2013 and has previously served as an independent director of China Merchants Bank.

He serves as executive vice-chairman of China Association of Private Equity, 1st interim chairman and vice president of Beijing Private Equity Association, vice president of China Association for the Promotion of Industrial Development, and president of Capital Enterprises Association.

He is a graduate of Tsinghua University.
