= Kenlon Industries Uganda Limited =

Ugandan sugar manufacturing company

Coordinates: 00°59′35″N 32°58′37″E

Kenlon Digital Distribution
- Type: Private
- Industry: Manufacture and distribution of sugar and other products
- Founded: 2010
- Headquarters: Kiduna Village; Namasagali; Kamuli District; Uganda
- Products: Sugar, molasses, edible oil, ethanol, bagasse and charcoal briquettes and charcoal powder
- Total assets: US$1 million - US2.5 million (2016)
- Number of employees: 50 - 100 (2016)
- Website: Homepage

Kenlon Industries Uganda Limited is a sugar manufacturing company in Uganda. It was licensed by the Uganda Ministry of Trade and Industry in 2011.

== Location ==
According to the company webpage, the company headquarters and factory are located in Kiduna Village, Kamuli District. In November 2011, the Daily Monitor newspaper gave the location of the company as Namasagali, a town in the district.

== Overview ==
The company was formed in 2010 and employs more than 50 but less than 100 workers. The company manufactures sugar, molasses, edible oil, ethanol, bagasse and charcoal briquettes and charcoal powder. Its total revenue is given as being between US$1 million and US$2.5 million annually. The company products are marketed to the countries of the East African Community and the Great Lakes region, namely Burundi, Kenya, Uganda, Rwanda, South Sudan Tanzania, and the Democratic Republic of Congo (DRC).

== See also ==
- List of sugar manufacturers in Uganda
