= Victoria Sugar Limited =

Sugar manufacturer in Uganda

Coordinates: 00°59′06″N 32°29′05″E

- Company type: Private
- Industry: Manufacture & Marketing of Sugar
- Founded: 2018; 8 years ago
- Headquarters: Luweero District, Uganda
- Key people: Jiyani Alpesh (Managing Director)
- Products: Sugar
- Number of employees: 8,000+ (2025)
- Website: Homepage

Victoria Sugar Limited (VSL), is a sugar-manufacturing company in Uganda.

== Location ==
The factory and company headquarters are located off the Kampala-Gulu Road, about 19 kilometres (12 mi) north of the town of Luweero, where the district headquarters are located.

== Overview ==
The factory sits on 17,000 acres (27 mi^{2}) of land in Luwweero District, Buganda Region, Uganda. Its parent group (Victora Group of Companies), owns another 10 square miles (6,400 acres) in neighboring Kiryandongo District for future expansion. In addition to land owned directly by the factory, there is a network of out-growers in the surrounding neighborhoods.

As of March 2025, the factory crushed an average of 3,000 tons of raw cane on a daily basis. This led to the daily production of 120 tons of brown granular table sugar or approximately 36,000 tons of sugar annually. In addition, at that time the factory generated 16 megawatts of electricity by incinerating bagasse. Of the 16MW, 6 megawatts were used internally and the remaining 10 MW were sold to the national grid to generate income.

By December 2025, energy production at the factory had adjusted to 15 MW total generation, with 5 MW used internally and 10 MW sold to the national grid. At that time, the factory was preparing to start generating another 3 MW of electricity from biogas.

== Victoria Group ==
Victoria Sugar Factory is a member of the Victoria Group of Companies, a Ugandan industrial conglomerate involved in "sugar manufacturing, clean energy co-generation, distillery operations, plastics manufacturing, tarpaulins, tyre manufacturing, tiles production, steel products, cable manufacturing, recycled batteries, and household utensils". The group was established in 2018 and had invested a reported US$150 million in the Ugandan economy by December 2024.

== See also ==
- List of sugar manufacturers in Uganda
- Luweero District
