= Sarrai Group =

Industrial conglomerate based in Ugandan

- Company type: Private Conglomerate
- Founded: 2000; 26 years ago
- Headquarters: Kampala, Uganda
- Key people: Sarbjit Singh Rai (Group Chairman)
- Products: Sugar, Ethanol, Electricity, Plywood, Cement
- Number of employees: 17,000+ (2022)

The Sarrai Group of Companies, commonly referred to as the Sarrai Group, is a privately owned conglomerate in East Africa and Southern Africa. The group maintains its headquarters in Kampala, Uganda, with subsidiaries in Kenya and Malawi. The group is headed by the executive group chairman, Sarbjit Singh Rai

== Overview ==
As of November 2023, the Sarrai Group comprises 11 subsidiary companies as outlined in the table below:

The Companies of The Sarrai Group
Rank	Company	Location	Products	Notes
1	Kinyara Sugar Works	Kinyara, Uganda	Brown Sugar, Industrial Sugar, Electricity	
2	Hoima Sugar Limited	Hoima District, Uganda	Brown sugar, Industrial ethanol	
3	Nile Plywoods Limited	Nakasongola District, Uganda	Plywood	
4	Nile Fiberboards Limited	Uganda	Fiberboard, MDF	
5	Comply Industries Limited	Nakuru, Kenya	Fiberboard, MDF, Doors	
6	Raiply Malawi Limited	Chikangawa, Malawi	Fiberboard, MDF, Doors	
7	Tasco Industries Limited	Uganda	Soap, Cooking oil	
8	Engaano Millers Limited	Jinja, Uganda	Wheat flour, Bread	
9	Vitafoam Limited	Uganda	Foam mattresses	
10	Rai Cement Limited	Kisumu, Kenya	Cement	
11	Hima Cement Limited	Hima, Uganda	Cement	

== History ==
The father of Sarbjit Singh Rai, the current chairman of the group, migrated from his native India and established businesses in Kenya. The father's brother, one Tarlochan Singh Rai, who either came with him or followed him to Kenya, also established his own chain of businesses. After the two brothers died their sons expanded and diversified the businesses, which operate separately. Sarbjit Singh Rai moved to Uganda and started the Sarrai Group. His cousin Jaswant Rai, stayed in Kenya, where he operates three sugar plantations; (a) West Kenya Sugar Limited (b) Sukari Industries Limited and (c) Olepito Sugar Limited.

== Kilembe Mines ==
In March 2025, the Ugandan government signed an agreement with the Sarrai Group and its subsidiary company domiciled in Uganda, Nile Fiberboard Limited, in a public private partnership to re-develop Kilembe Mines. The entities involved in the re-development are as illustrated in the table below.

Entities Involved In Kilembe Mines Re-Development
Rank	Development Partner	Domicile	Percentage	Notes
1	Uganda Ministry of Energy and Mines	Uganda		
2	Uganda Ministry of Finance	Uganda		
3	Sarrai Group	Uganda		
4	Nile Fiberboard Limited	Uganda		

The new investors, Sarrai Group and Nile Fiberboard Limited are expected fund the re-opening of the mine and extract copper and cobalt and then share the profits with the two government ministries. The re-opened mine is expected to employ over 1,000 Ugandans.

== Acquisition of Hima Cement Limited ==
In November 2023, the Sarrai Group signed binding documentation to buy the 70 percent of Hima Cement Limited that Holcim held in the cement maker, through several subsidiaries including Bamburi Cement of Kenya. The purchase price is reported as US$84 million. The deal required regulatory approval in Switzerland, Kenya, Uganda and COMESA.

== Controversy and cancellation of Mumias Sugar Lease ==
In December 2021, the Sarrai Group controversially won a tender to lease Mumias Sugar Company Limited in neighboring Kenya. However, the announcement of the lease award was successfully challenged in Kenya High Court leading to immediate suspension of the lease on 29 December 2021, by Justice Kenneth Ndung'u of Nairobi High Court. The judge cited a petition by one of the bidders alleging fraud, mistakes and illegalities in the leasing process.

On 29 December 2021, the Kenya High Court in Nairobi, suspended the Mumias lease offer to Sarrai Group after one of the bidders filed a case against a lease award, with Sarrai Group and Mumias Sugar receiver manager named as defendants. The bidder, Tumaz and Tumaz Enterprises, which had placed the highest bid of Kshs. 27.6 billion against Kshs. 11.5 billion for Sarrai Group, alleged fraud, mistakes and illegalities in the bidding process, which was headed by Kenya Commercial Bank (KCB)'s receivership manager P V Rao. Mumias Sugar was placed under receivership in 2018 by KCB, which was one of its creditors. Justice Kenneth Ndung'u of Milimani High Court in Nairobi suspended the lease award and ordered KCB's receiver manager and Sarrai Group not to interfere with Mumias Sugar until the case was heard and determined.

In January 2022, other bidders including West Kenya Sugar Company were enjoined in new cases filed against Sarrai Group and P V Rao. A group of Mumias Sugar farmers filed another lawsuit challenging the lease award. They protested that KCB's receiver manager had erred in awarding the lease to the lowest bidder. West Kenya Sugar company told the court that it was the highest bidder, and yet the lease was awarded at a cost of Kshs. 5.8 billion to Sarrai Group. They contested that Sarrai Group was the lowest bidder out of 8 bidders who had submitted their bids. The Nairobi High Court judge Okwany issued a second lease suspension until 14 March 2022, when the case would be heard and determined. The farmers had sued Sarrai Group, P V Rao, the Attorney General, Competition Authority, Kakamega County government among others. In its reply to the suit, the Competition Authority of Kenya told the court that the lease award was fraudulent, because the KCB receiver manager and Sarrai Group failed to get its approval before taking over the lease. They said it was a criminal act as per the Competition Act of the 2010 Kenyan Constitution.

In early February, 2022 another round of lawsuits were filed by creditors including the law firm of Kimeto, which is owed Kshs. 76 million. The law firm claimed that the leasing process was fraudulent because KCB's receiver manager had filed documents in court showing that KCB collected over Kshs. 1.5 billion from running Mumias Sugar since 2018. They argued that KCB's Mumias Sugar debt of Kshs. 570 million should already have been credited from the collections which were 3 times the debt KCB was owed. They wanted KCB receiver manager to be fired by the court and a new tender process to be announced and administered by the court. They argued that the previous tendering process had virtually collapsed after a barrage of lawsuits were filed, and effectively stopped the operations of Mumias Sugar.

In February 2022, 500 former employees of Mumias Sugar who occupied the company's houses claimed that they were served with eviction orders by Sarrai Group, despite court orders stopping the eviction without their salary compensation. Sarrai Group's eviction notices were in violation of court orders. These evictions echo of another controversy involving a Sarrai Group subsidiary in neighboring Uganda, in which Sarrai Group brutally evicted 5,000 people from their ancestral lands, prompting a Commission of Inquiry.

On 14 April 2022, the lease award was legally canceled by Justice Mabeya for failure to consider other creditors, for failure to consult the Competition Authority of Kenya, for failure to explain how Mumias would repay its creditors, and for failure to conduct a feasibility study. The Judge further demanded that the administrator step aside and give unrestricted access of Mumias to the newly appointed administrator, Mr. Kereto Marima. The new administrator is to "start the lease process afresh, in consultation with all the secured and unsecured creditors."

== Burundi ==
On 29 December 2023 the Burundian head of state said he had visited the Sarrai Group in Uganda, which he described as a very efficient company. He had invited them to become partners with Société Sucrière du Moso (SUSOMO), the local sugar company, and claimed that production would rise to 300,000 tons per year after three years of production, with a workforce of 12,000. Burundi would supply the sugar cane plantations and the Sarrai Group would supply the other capital. This announcement came at a time when the sugar cane plantations were flooded and could not be accessed by cane transport vehicles.

On 4 April 2024 the Managing Director of SOSUMO told workers that the date of 18 April for the start of the Sarrai Group partnership given by the Ministry of Commerce was incorrect, since they were still at the stage of assessing the assets of SOSUMO and negotiating terms of partnership.

== See also ==
- List of conglomerates in Uganda
- List of conglomerates in Africa
- Kampala Capital City Authority
