= Masaka Regional Referral Hospital =

Hospital in the city of Masaka, in south-central Uganda

- Uganda Ministry of Health

Geography
- Location: Masaka, Masaka District, Uganda
- Coordinates: 00°19′46″S 31°44′04″E

Organisation
- Care system: Public
- Type: General and Teaching

Services
- Emergency department: I
- Beds: 730

History
- Founded: 1929

Links
- Other links: Hospitals in Uganda; Medical education in Uganda

Masaka Regional Referral Hospital, commonly known as Masaka Hospital is a hospital in the city of Masaka, in south-central Uganda. It is the referral hospital for the districts of Kalangala District, Lyantonde, Masaka and Sembabule, Kalungu, Lwengo, Bukomansimbi and Rakai.

== Location ==
Masaka Hospital is located in the central business district of the town of Masaka, approximately 132 kilometres (82 mi), by road, southwest of Mulago National Referral Hospital, in Kampala, Uganda's capital and largest city.

The coordinates of Masaka Regional Referral Hospital are: 0°19'46.0"S, 31°44'04.0"E (Latitude:-0.329444; Longitude:31.734444).

== Overview ==
Masaka Hospital is a public hospital, funded by the Uganda Ministry of Health and general care in the hospital is free. It is one of the 13 Regional Referral Hospitals in Uganda. The hospital is designated as one of the 15 Internship Hospitals in Uganda where graduates of Ugandan medical schools can serve one year of internship under the supervision of qualified specialists and consultants. The official bed capacity of Masaka Hospital is quoted as 330, but often twice that number or more is accommodated. The hospital averages about 450 daily admissions.

== Recent developments ==
In June 2014, works began at the hospital for the construction of a hospital tower to house maternity and pediatric units with a total bed capacity of 400 inpatients. The work was contracted to Tirupati Development Uganda Limited, and is expected to last about 24 months. Construction of the five story hospital extension is fully funded by the Government of Uganda.

== See also ==
- Hospitals in Uganda
