= BMK Group =

Electronics manufacturing services company

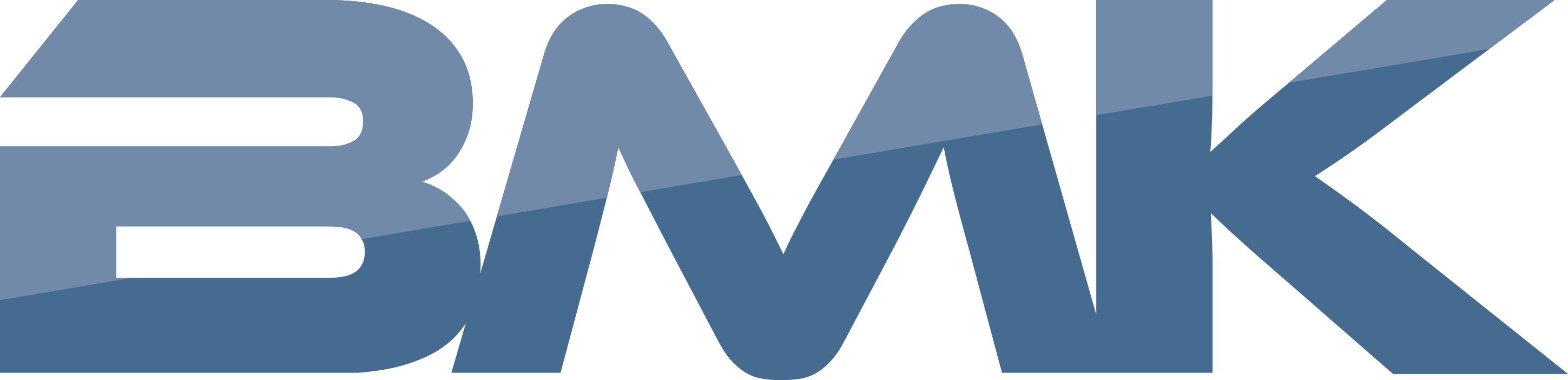
- Company type: GmbH & Co. KG
- Industry: Electronics Manufacturing Services; Original Design Manufacturer
- Founded: April 5, 1994; 32 years ago
- Founders: Stephan Baur; Dieter Müller; Alois Knöferle
- Headquarters: Augsburg, Germany
- Key people: Alois Knöferle (General Manager)
- Revenue: 204 million. EUR (2016)
- Owner: Hanza AB
- Number of employees: > 900 (December 2016)
- Website: https://www.bmk-group.de/en/home

The BMK Group is a German electronics manufacturing services company headquartered in Augsburg with locations in Germany and the Czech Republic. The firm specializes in PCB Assembly, engineering, testing and final assemblies of whole devices and modules.

It serves companies from different industries such as medical devices, automotive, metering, consumers, rail technology or telecommunications. Apart from manufacturing and development, BMK also focuses on product life cycle management, supply chain management, material management and after sales services.

== History ==
BMK Group was founded in 1994 as a management buyout by Stephan Baur, Dieter Müller and Alois Knöferle as BMK professional electronics GmbH. Formerly it was a subsidiary of AT&T Inc.

In January 2026, the Swedish company Hanza announced that it had completed the purchase of BMK for SEK 3.3 billion. As part of the share-based transaction, the founders of the German firm received newly issued shares from the new owner as compensation, and BMK became part of its European operations.

== Group structure ==
The Group is divided in three subsidiaries:

- BMK professional electronics GmbH: PCB assembly contract manufacturer with plants in Germany and Czech Republic
- BMK electronic solutions GmbH: focus on engineering and electronics development
- BMK electronic services GmbH: after-sales and data management
