= Bulaimu Muwanga Kibirige =

Ugandan businessman and entrepreneur (1953–2021)

- Born: 2 October 1953; Uganda
- Died: 10 September 2021 (aged 67); Nairobi, Kenya
- Burial place: Nkoowe, Wakiso District
- Citizenship: Uganda
- Occupations: Businessman and entrepreneur
- Notable work: My story of building a fortune in Africa
- Title: Chairman of the BMK Group of Companies

Bulaimu Muwanga Kibirige (2 October 1953 – 10 September 2021), commonly known as BMK, was a Ugandan businessman, entrepreneur, and hotel owner. According to a 2012 published report, he was one of the wealthiest people in Uganda.

== Background ==
The 14 year old school drop out Bulayimu Muwanga kivumbi started to work in his father's restaurant in Masaka before starting his trading related works. He opened up some trading outlets in Kampala, Nairobi, Bangkok and Thailand between 1973 and 1976. Hailing from Matanga in Buddu County, Masaka District, in 1986 he started a general trade and manufacturing company. He was known for his investments in real estate, construction equipments, motorcycle distributorships and foreign exchange bureaus across East and Central Africa. BMK is the brain behind boda-boda rides in Uganda - a transport mechanism that was used mostly at the border of Uganda and Kenya. He later began their export direct from Japan starting the boda boda culture. In 1997, BMK started with the 40-room motel Hotel Africana, on Kololo Hill, located in Kampala's central business district. Over the next decade, the hotel grew into a four-star establishment.

== Business interests ==
BMK was the chairman and managing director of the BMK Group of companies, whose member businesses include:

1. Hotel Africana Kampala, 2-4 Wampewo Avenue, Kololo Hill, Kampala, Uganda.

3. Hotel Africana Lusaka, Lusaka, Zambia

4. BMK Motorcycles (U) Limited, Nateete, Kampala, Uganda

5. BMK Motorcycles (K) Limited, Nairobi, Kenya

6. BMK Motorcycles (T) Limited, Dar es Salaam, Tanzania

7. BMK Motorcycles (R) Limited, Kigali, Rwanda

8. BMK Motorcycles (Z) Limited, Lusaka, Zambia

9. Hotel Africana Forex Bureau 1, 2-4 Wampewo Avenue, Kampala, Uganda

10. Hotel Africana Forex Bureau 2, 16-18 William Street, Kampala, Uganda

11. BMK Construction Leasing Company, Kigali, Rwanda

12. BMK Oil Equipment Company, Kampala, Uganda

== Other responsibilities ==
BMK served in the following public positions:

1. Chairman of the Uganda Hotel Owners Association

2. Board member of the Ugandan North American Association (UNAA)

3. Chairman Executive Board for Uganda Sickle Cell Rescue Foundation

== Other awards ==
Bulayimu Muwanga Kivumbi was awarded a doctorate of Philosophy in Humanities at the United Graduate College and Seminary in 2014. In the same year, he received a Diaspora lifetime award for Entrepreneurship in East and Central African region.

== Illness and death ==
BMK had been battling cancer for some time before his death. He was admitted to a hospital in Nairobi, Kenya, for some time, before he died there on 10 September 2021, at the age of 67.

== See also ==
- List of conglomerates in Uganda
- Tourism in Uganda
- Ham Kiggundu
- Godfrey Kirumira
