= Wangfujing Department Store =

Department store in Beijing, China

Coordinates: 39.9110°N 116.4112°E

Wangfujing (Chinese: 王府井百货) is a Chinese department store based in Beijing. Through a joint venture with Japanese department store Ito-Yokado, Wangfujing Yokado opened China's first full-scale food supermarket. Both companies each have a 40% stake. Japanese supermarket operator York-Benimaru Co. has the remaining 20%. It welcomes more than 10 million customers per day. It uses cloud computing services from IBM. The store is owned by the Chinese government.

== See also ==
- Wangfujing
- Wangfujing station
