= Vito Rodriguez Rodriguez =

Peruvian businessman (1939–2022)

- Born: c. 1939; Arequipa, Peru
- Died: June 17, 2022
- Education: National University of Engineering
- Occupation: Businessman
- Known for: Gloria S.A.
- Children: 3

Vito Rodriguez Rodriguez (c. 1939 − June 17, 2022) was a Peruvian billionaire businessman.

== See also ==
- List of Peruvian billionaires by net worth
