= Edge Tech Corp =

US computer memory manufacturer

- Type: Private
- Industry: Computer memory
- Founded: June 1986; 40 years ago in Ada, Oklahoma, United States
- Founder: Jeff Thompson
- Headquarters: Ada, Oklahoma, United States
- Number of locations: 2
- Area served: Worldwide
- Products: DRAM; Solid-state drives; USB flash drives; Memory cards; Hard disk drives
- Revenue: US$ 49.5 million (2007)
- Number of employees: 700 (2010)
- Website: www.edgetechcorp.com

Edge Tech Corp (ETC) is a US-based manufacturer and supplier of computer memory upgrades, including DRAM, solid-state drives, USB flash drives, memory cards, and hard disk drives. Edge Tech was founded in 1986 and is headquartered in Ada, Oklahoma and maintains sales, marketing and eCommerce facilities in Addison, Texas.

== History ==
Peripheral Outlet was formed in 1986 by 14-year-old Jeff Thompson, with $2,500 he had saved from his paper route in Ada, Oklahoma. Thompson was named Young Entrepreneur of the Year in 1994 by the U.S. Small Business Administration, and profiled in Fortune magazine.

By 1996, the company's sales had increased by 650% and was named to the Inc. magazine 500 list of the fastest growing private companies. Peripheral Outlet incorporated and became Peripheral Enhancements Corporation (PECO).

In 1998, PECO acquired the NewerRam division of Newer Technology and opened offices in Dallas, Texas.

In 1999, PECO obtained ISO 9001 certification.

Peripheral Enhancements Corporation became EDGE Tech Corporation in 2004 and moved to new office space in Ada in 2006.
