= Orissa Minerals Development Company =

Orissa Minerals Development Company Limited(OMDC)
- Company type: Public Sector Undertaking; Bird Group of Companies under The Bird & Company Ltd ( Acquisition and Transfer of Undertakings and other properties ) Act, 1980
- Traded as: NSE: ORISSAMINE; BSE: 590086
- ISIN: INE725E01024
- Industry: Mining
- Founded: August 16, 1918; 107 years ago
- Founder: Government of India
- Headquarters: Bhubaneswar, Odisha, India
- Area served: India
- Operating income: Rs 29.14 crore (March 2020)
- Total assets: Rs 479.45 crore (March 2020)
- Owner: Bird Group of Companies

The Orissa Minerals Development Company Limited (OMDC), (also known as Orissa Minerals), is a Public Sector Undertaking company in the Indian states of Odisha under administrative control of Ministry of Steel, Government of India. It was founded on August 16, 1918, and is engaged in the mining and production of iron ore and manganese ore. It is a subsidiary of state-owned Rashtriya Ispat Nigam Limited. It is listed at Calcutta Stock Exchange (CSE), National Stock Exchange of India (NSE) and Bombay Stock Exchange (BSE).

== History ==
OMDC was incorporated on August 16, 1918. In 1980, the company was nationalized by Government of India through the Bird & Company Limited. It became a Public Sector Undertaking in March 2010.

According to Indian Bureau of Mines approval, it had an annual production capacity of 2.20 million tons of Iron Ore and 0.1 million tons of Manganese ore.

As of March 2016, the net worth of Orissa Minerals Development Company Limited is ₹834.91 crore (US$87 million). It ranks #6 in the Top 10 Loss Making CPSEs for 2018–19 with a net loss of ₹452 crore (US$47 million), as per the list released by the Public Enterprises Survey, Ministry of Heavy Industries and Public Enterprises.

=== Insolvency ===
In October 2020, OMDC admitted to Corporate Insolvency Resolution Process (CIRP) under the provision of IBC, 2016. The bankruptcy case was accepted by the National Company Law Tribunal court.

Earlier in 2018, the Corporate Insolvency Resolution Process (CIRP) was initiated against the company, but the case was settled when the company paid creditors' dues.

== Mines ==
It operates six iron ore and manganese ore mining leases, including Dalki Manganese Mines, Kolha Roida Iron & Manganese mines, Thakurani Iron & Manganese Mines, Belkundi Iron & Manganese Mines, Bariaburu Iron Mines hand Bhadrasai Iron & Manganese Mines. The mining leases located are at Barbil in the district of Kendujhar, Odisha. As of October 2020, the mining operations of Orissa Minerals are under suspension due to non availability of statutory clearances.

== See also ==
- Public sector undertakings in India
- List of public sector undertakings in India
