= Hima Cement Limited =

Ugandan cement manufacturer

Coordinates: 00°17′21″N 30°10′45″E

- Company type: Subsidiary of Sarrai Group
- Industry: Manufacturer and distributor of cement
- Founded: 1994; 32 years ago
- Headquarters: Hima, Uganda
- Key people: Rajbir Singh Rai; Managing Director
- Products: Cement
- Number of employees: 700+ (2011)
- Parent: Sarrai Group

Hima Cement Limited (HCL) is a cement manufacturer in Uganda. It is a subsidiary of the Sarrai Group, a diversified manufacturing conglomerate headquartered in Uganda with subsidiaries in Uganda, Kenya and Malawi.

== Location ==
The main factories of HCL are located in Hima in Kasese District in the Western Region of Uganda. This is approximately 23.5 kilometres (15 mi), by road, northeast of Kasese, the nearest large town and the location of the district headquarters. Hima is approximately 350 kilometres (217 mi), by road, west of Kampala, the capital and largest city of Uganda. The geographical coordinates of the main factory are: 0°17'21.0"N, 30°10'45.0"E (Latitude:0.289167; Longitude:30.179167).

In 2018, HCL opened a new US$40 million cement factory along the Tororo-Mbale-Soroti Road, with production capacity of 850,000 tonnes (936,965 tons) annually, to match the output from Kasese District. The new factory will increase total output for Hima Cement Uganda Limited to 1,900,000 tonnes (2,094,391 tons) annually. The Tororo factory of Hima Cement Limited came online in 2018.

== Overview ==
As of 2019, HCL was the second-largest manufacturer of cement in Uganda, producing an estimated 2 million metric tonnes annually, accounting for 28 percent on national output. 20 percent of Hima's production was exported to South Sudan, the Democratic Republic of the Congo and Rwanda.

In addition to the factories in Hima and Tororo, HCL maintains a corporate office in Twed Towers, Kafu Road, in Kampala and two warehouses, one in Kampala's industrial area and the other in the eastern border town of Tororo. HCL also owns a limestone quarry at Dura in the Kamwenge District, which supplies the limestone used in cement manufacturing. The quarry is estimated to contain enough limestone to sustain current production capacity until 2036.

== History ==
In 1994, the parastatal formerly known as Uganda Cement Industries was privatized by the government of Uganda. It was split into Tororo Cement and Hima Cement. The two companies were acquired by different investors. Tororo Cement eventually became Tororo Cement Limited. In 1999, the French conglomerate LaFarge acquired 100 percent shareholding in Hima Cement and re-branded the company into Hima Cement Limited. Production capacity at the HCL's factories increased steadily from the 20,000 metric tonnes in 1994 to 850,000 tonnes in 2011. In 2018, total production capacity at both factories in Hima and Tororo, in Uganda was 1,700,000 tonnes (1,873,929 tons) annually.

== Supply contracts ==
In July 2017, HCL signed a memorandum of understanding with the China Communications Construction Company to supply 120,000 metric tonnes of cement for three public projects as follows: 1. Over the next five years, HCL will supply 30,000 metric tonnes of cement (60 percent of the project requirements) for the ongoing expansion of the Entebbe International Airport. 2. Over the next three years, HCL will supply 60,000 metric tonnes of cement for the Mubende-Kakumiro-Kagadi Road. 3. Over the next three years, HCL will supply 30,000 metric tonnes of cement for the Tororo-Mbale-Soroti Road. 4. Hima Cement has been the largest supplier of cement during the construction of the 600 megawatts Karuma Hydroelectric Power Station, between 2013 and 2020.

== Ownership ==
Prior to November 2023, Hima Cement Limited was a subsidiary of Holcim, a large Swiss-based buildings material conglomerate. The table below illustrates the shareholders in Hima Cement Limited at that time.

Hima Cement Limited stock ownership before November 2023
Rank	Name of owner	Number of shares	Percentage ownership
1	Holcim	1,335,600	70.00
2	Cementia Holdings AG	572,400	30.00
	Total	1,908,000	100.00

In November 2023, the Sarrai Group of Uganda signed binding documentation to buy the 70 percent that Holcim previously held in Hima Cement Limited, for a consideration of US$84 million. Contemporaneously, Rwimi Holdings Limited, another Ugandan company, signed documentation to buy the remaining 30 percent of the Ugandan cement maker from Cementia Holding AG at a price reported at US$36 million. The transactions require regulatory approval from Kenya, Uganda, Switzerland and COMESA.

When the deal receives regulatory approval, the shareholding in the business will look as depicted in the table below. The sale was concluded on 5 March 2024 after all the regulatory approvals were obtained.

Hima Cement Limited stock ownership after November 2023
Rank	Name of owner	Number of shares	Percentage ownership
1	Sarrai Group	1,335,600	70.00
2	Rwimi Holdings	572,400	30.00
	Total	1,908,000	100.00

== Developments ==
In November 2023, Hima Cement and Coca-Cola Beverages Uganda (CCBU), Ugandan subsidiary of Coca-Cola Beverages Africa, signed a memorandum of understanding (MOU) outlining collaboration between the two in reducing plastic waste in Uganda. The MOU stipulates that CCBU will collect plastic waste from used beverage bottles that it produces and pass on those bottles to Hima Cement who will incorporate the plastic waste in heating up their kilns in the manufacture of cement. The collaboration will initially last three years.
