= Bumi Laut Group =

Shipping company of Indonesia

- Company type: Private
- Industry: Shipping and Logistics
- Founded: 1922; 104 years ago
- Headquarters: Jakarta, Indonesia
- Key people: Arya Johan Singgih (Chairman); Jaka Aryadipa Singgih (CEO)
- Products: Transportation, energy, investments
- Number of employees: 2,000
- Website: www.bumilaut.com

PT Bumi Laut Shipping Corp., also known as Bumi Laut Group, is a long-established shipping company in Indonesia. The company's headquarters are located in Jakarta, and it operates offices across the country. The Bumi Laut Group manages a diverse portfolio of wholly owned enterprises, encompassing shipping, logistics, transportation, infrastructure, agriculture, resource-based industries, financial advisory, and investments.

== History ==
The Bumi Laut Group established its inaugural office in 1922 at the Port of Belawan Deli, located in North Sumatera, Indonesia. This port was historically recognized as the largest hub for exporting natural commodities in Indonesia.

== The group's businesses ==
The Bumi Laut Group is primarily engaged in various businesses related to shipping and logistics, including:

- Ship ownership and operation
- International shipping agencies, involving marketing and sales, ship handling, port operations, and terminal services.
- Ship management encompasses crew agency and management, as well as marine, nautical, and technical services.
- Chartering and tramping operations in the spot shipping business
- Logistics services, including freight forwarding, inland transportation, warehousing, depot facilities, and other supporting services
- Transportation of project cargo, general bulk cargoes, and energy resources through contract, parcel, and regular liner business
- Commercial shipping line and inter-island feeder service.
- Provision of marine and offshore services
- Infrastructure development, such as ports, jetties, and stockpile facilities, along with transportation services for coal and other bulk cargoes.
- Shipbroking activities

== List of key executives ==
- Arya Johan Singgih (second generation), Chairman
- Jaka Aryadipa Singgih (third generation), CEO and managing director
