= Tirupati Group =

Ugandan construction and real estate company

Tirupati Group Limited
- Type: Private
- Industry: Construction; Real estate
- Founded: 2006; 20 years ago
- Headquarters: Tirupati Mazima Mall; Ggaba Road, Kabalagala, Kampala, Uganda
- Key people: Harshad Barot (founder); Kruti Barot(managing director & Miraj Barot; joint managing director num_employees = 2,000+ (2014)
- Products: Apartment complexes; Condominiums; Office towers; Shopping malls
- Total assets: US$100+ million (2014)
- Website: Homepage

Tirupati Group Limited (TGL) is a privately owned real estate development and construction company in Uganda. Tirupati Group Limited provides development funding and also constructs its own buildings.

== History ==
The company was established in 2006. During its first five years of existence, the company developed and constructed four projects: (a) Tirupati House located in the Kamwookya suburb of the country's capital, Kampala, (b) Ovino Market, a development in the Kisenyi Area, a former slum in the center of Kampala, (c) Bugoloobi Executive Apartments, an upscale development in the suburb of Bugolobi and (d) Nkumba Village a mixed-use development consisting of university student hostel and a shopping mall, near the campus of Nkumba University, approximately 8 kilometres (5.0 mi), by road, northeast of the central business district of the town of Entebbe.

In 2010, Tirupati was recognized for ‘Introduction of a Novel And Competitive Product In East African Region’, during the 16th Annual Investor of the Year Award Ceremony held by the Uganda Investment Authority. It was in regard to Tirupati's Ovino Market, in Kisenyi, Kampala.

In June 2014, TGL won a contract to upgrade and renovate Masaka Regional Referral Hospital for approximately US$4 million (USh:10.6 billion).

== Scope of work ==
As of November 2014 the following real estate projects have either been completed or are in development by the company:

Name of development	Location	Country	Type	Capacity	Year completed or completion expected	Estimated value (US$)	Notes	
Namanve Shopping Center	KIBP	Uganda	Shopping Mall	150 Offices	2017			
Tirupati Bujumbura Shopping Center	Bujumbura	Burundi	Shopping Mall	Offices, Restaurants & Shops	2016			
Tirupati Bukoto Shopping Mall	Bukoto	Uganda	Shopping Mall	Offices, Shops, Restaurants, Parking & Security	2018			
Marina Portbell Apartments	Port Bell	Uganda	Residential Apartments	150 Offices	2018			
Tirupati Heights	Kampala	Uganda	Upscale Apartments	Apartments	2018			
Tirupati New Mazima	Kampala	Uganda	Shopping Mall	Retail space, Parking, Security	2019			
Tirupati Towers	Kampala	Uganda	Office Complex	150 Offices	2020			
Bugolobi Apartments	Bugolobi	Uganda	Upscale Apartments	14 Luxury Apartments	2020		Condominiums	
Mazima Shopping Mall I	Nsambya	Uganda	Shopping Mall	Retail shops, Supermarket, Offices & Parking	2012	15 million	Opposite American Embassy	Sits on 1.2 acres
Mazima Shopping Mall II	Kabalagala	Uganda	Shopping Mall	Hotel, Restaurant, Ban Hall	2015	2.1 million	Bank of Baroda on Ground Floor	
Tirupati Half London	Kabalagala	Uganda	Office Complex	Offices	2012	2.1 million		
Nkumba University Hostel	Nkumba, Entebbe	Uganda	University Student Hostel	144 Self-contained rooms	2011	3 million	Located on 22 acres with lake view	
Ovino Market	Kisenyi, Kampala	Uganda	Urban Retail Market	350 retail shops, 50-room hotel, 7 restaurants, parking	2010	10 million		
Miami Villas	Luzira, Kampala	Uganda	Luxury Homes	6 Villas, each with 3 ensuite bedrooms	2011	12.1 million		
Tirupati House	Kamwookya, Kampala	Uganda	Office Tower	14 Executive Offices & Retail Units	2008	2 million	Houses HQ of TDUL	

== Subsidiary companies ==
In addition to developing and constructing real estate projects, TGL has several non-real-estate related subsidiaries.

Bio-Waste Management Limited collects and disposes of biomedical and pharmaceutical waste in an environmentally friendly and safe manner. Offices and disposal facilities are located 30 kilometres (19 mi) by road northeast of Kampala.

Tirupati Agricultural Development Limited is an agribusiness that operates a demonstration farm on 400 acres (160 ha) and maintains a sugarcane plantation on the adjacent 2,500 acres (1,000 ha). Crops on this demonstration farm include pineapples, maize and onions. It is located in Kayunga District.

== See also ==
- List of conglomerates in Uganda
- List of conglomerates in Africa
- Kampala Capital City Authority
- Miraj Barot
