= Guangxi Guitang Group =

Sugar refinery company

The Guitang Group is a state-owned conglomerate operating China's largest sugar refinery with over 3,800 workers and 14,700 ha land for cultivating sugar cane. Cost of sugar production in Guigang is high due to a multitude of small farms growing canes with low sugar content, resulting in large amounts of by-products that go un-utilized by small-scale refineries and generate high levels of emissions to the air, water, and soil.

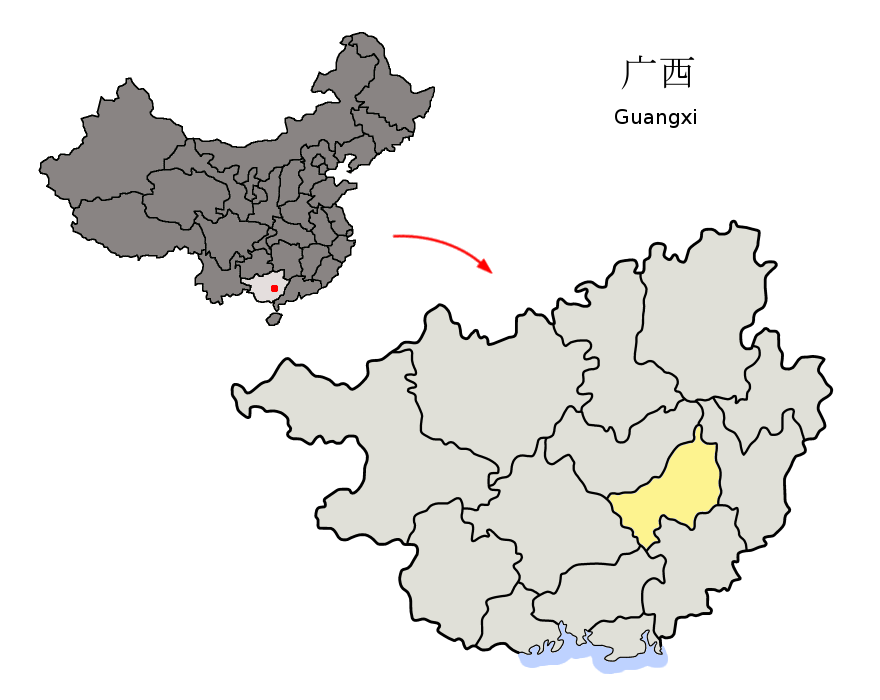
Location of Guigang Prefecture within Guangxi (China)

== History of the Guitang Group ==
The Guitang Group was established by the Chinese government in 1956 with a sugar refinery and connected alcohol plant that utilized molasses from sugar production. Their original plan was designed to improve their bottom line, but the emission lowering implications soon became evident. Guitang expanded its campus to include three paper mills that use the bagasse (fiber residue from the crushing and grinding of raw sugarcane) as raw material along with other facilities to handle downstream waste products. Guitang has maintained a close relationship with farmers by selling them fertilizer, which in turn allows them to produce higher yielding, better quality sugar cane. In 1997, Guitang was bought by a privately held company, Shenzhen Huaqiang Holdings Ltd. that is dedicated to maintaining Guitang as a model for Chinese industrial symbiosis. Inspired by Guitang, the city of Guigang has enacted a 5-year plan to become an eco-industrial city and improve sugar production efficiency to stay competitive with other sugar producers in the global market.

== Benefits of the park ==
=== Economic ===
Unlike many other Chinese sugar producers, Guitang was able to compete in the global sugar market through improving their bottom line by utilising waste products. Their commitment to quality has won them a large market share, allowing them to sell sugar at rates 30-35% higher than other Chinese mills.

=== Emissions ===
Since they utilize almost all downstream waste, Guitang has succeeded in virtually eliminating its emissions in exchange for the ability to produce and market new products to consumers. They also purchase the by-products of other small scale surrounding refineries, allowing for the expansion of their own production.

=== Community ===
Guitang maintains a close relationship with farmers by selling them fertilizer in return for high quality sugar cane. Furthermore, the group's commitment to technology and industrial symbiosis attracts young, well-educated workers to Guangxi who would have otherwise migrated to more developed regions.

== Design and construction ==
The Guitang Group constructed an eco-industrial park (EIP) with two main value chains: a paper chain, and an alcohol chain. Each of these chains deals with different by-products to make final products in each stage of production. The alcohol chain includes a sugar refinery, an alcohol plant, and a fertilizer plant. Each by-product of production at each stage of the chain provides an input of raw material to the next stage. A description of how each chain operates is described by a case study on the Guitang Group.

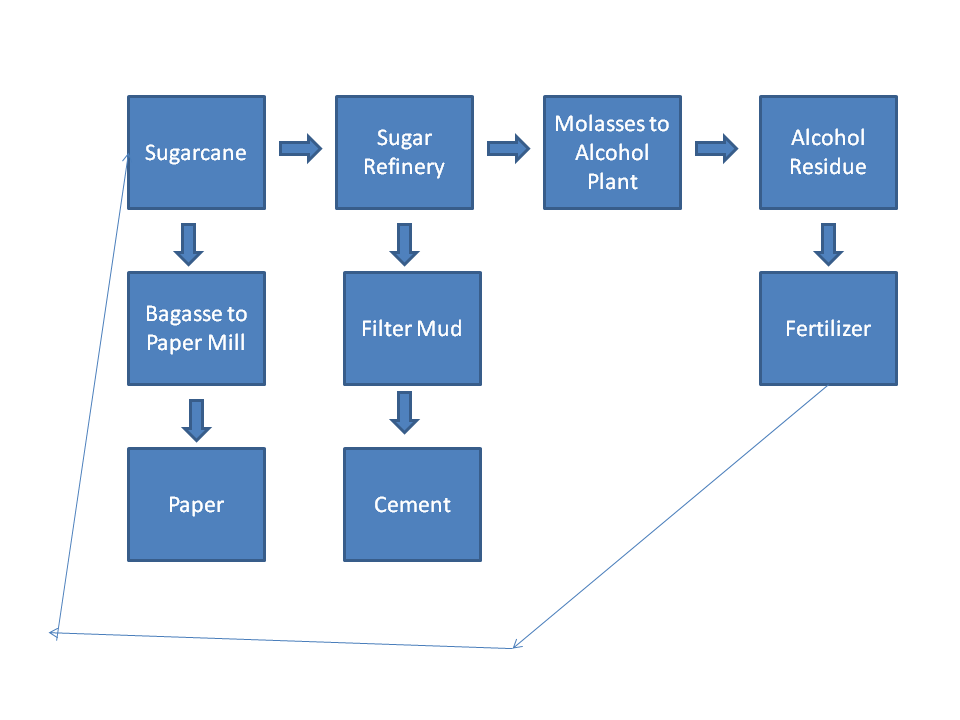
Guitang Material Flow modified from Qinghua, Zhu, Ernest Loew, et al., et al. "Industrial Symbiosis in China: A case study of the Guitang Group." Journal of Industrial Ecology. 11. (2007): 31-42. Web. 15 Apr. 2013.

"The sugarcane enters the sugar mill and is processed along one of two product chains: the sugar chain (containing the originally conceived sugar refinery and the alcohol plant) or the paper chain (containing the pulp and paper mills). Each downstream (internal) company uses the by-products from upstream companies as secondary material inputs. In addition, careful attention is given to reducing the residual waste and to its ultimate disposal. The sugar chain results in the ultimate production of sugar, alcohol, cement, and compound fertilizer (i.e., fertilizer with a specific ratio of nitrogen, phosphorus, and potassium). In the sugar refinery, the sugarcane “juice” that is released in the crushing and grinding assembly in the sugar mill is refined in a carbonation process that yields a higher quality refined sugar than does the sulfitation process that is used by the majority of cane sugar plants in China (Wei 2004). Wei notes that sulfitation is favored by the GG’s competitors, in part, because the filter mud (one of the wastes from the refining process) from sulfitation can easily be disposed of as a direct application fertilizer. Filter mud from the carbonation process, on the other hand, can have a significant negative effect on the local soil if it is applied directly to the land. The GG has addressed this problem by using the carbonation filter mud as an input to the State-owned cement production facility it manages, rather than as a fertilizer. The GG contributes the filter mud and pays for transportation costs, balancing the savings from not having to pay for disposal. The fuel for the cement plant is coal, introducing an added environmental burden on the symbiosis. The residues from the alcohol plant (molasses)—which once would have been released into the environment—are now used as input to the production of compound fertilizer, which goes back to the sugarcane fields, thus closing this loop. The paper chain is driven by the input of bagasse, which is the residue from the sugar mill, minus the pith; that is, the soft interior portion of the cane. Sixty percent of the bagasse has fibers long enough for paper-making. The short fibers of the pith are used as fuel in a cogeneration power plant. Earlier, the GG burnt the bagasse in its power plant and sold it to homeowners for cooking and heating. The pulping operation that prepares the bagasse for conversion into paper requires a significant addition of alkali, which ends up in the residue of that operation. The GG has constructed an alkali recovery plant that recycles the waste from the pulping operation (black liquor), generating a white sludge that can be used as input to the cement mill, which is primarily a part of the sugar chain. The pulp is processed by one of the three paper mills, where a major waste (white liquor) is generated and subsequently treated to recover major portions of fiber and water, which are recycled to the paper mills."

== Stages of technological development ==
Stage 1

The birth of the paper production technology using bagasse and the fertilizer production technology using alcohol residue. The main residues out of sugar refinery are molasses and bagasse. The bagasse residue was used to produce hand-made paper and bagasse board since the 1950s. The toilet paper began being produced from 100% bagasse residue in the mid 1980s. In the late 1990s, started producing high-quality office paper using high-proportion of bagasse and afterwards improved the quality of the paper through a series of process innovation. The molasses residue was used to produce alcohol. In 2002, the company succeeded in producing compound fertilizer using alcohol residue.

Stage 2

Upgrade of the paper production technology using bagasse. In 2003, the Guitang Group could produce high-quality household paper using bagasse with proportion of 70% on the machine with speed of 1,500m/min. The technology of producing high-quality household paper using high-proportion bagasse on high-speed machine has become the company’s core technology. The Group also found solutions to green bleaching technological innovation by using non-chlorine bleaching of bagasse for a cleaner production to reduce the environmental pollution and decrease the consumption of chemicals and water.

Stage 3

Introduction and development of the complementary technologies. The Group advanced the technological transformation of cogeneration of heat and power using sugarcane pith in order to improve energy efficiency and decrease emission of SO2 and greenhouse gases. They introduced an advanced end-of-pipe technique of wastewater anaerobic treatment, which could eliminate biological oxygen demand (BOD) by 93% and chemical oxygen demand (COD) by 94%. Another successful green technological innovation is transforming the pollutant of white sludge generated from the alkali recovery process into the filter and desulfurizer.

== Tenants and products ==
Established in 1954 by the state, it has since become the largest sugar refinery in China. It began as a standalone sugar refinery, then started employing industrial symbiosis techniques, and continued for forty years using primarily downstream by-products associated with the production from the sugar production. Afterwards, it made connections with local suppliers of sugar cane, and with local government. The Guitang Group strongly maintains their close relationship with the sugar farmers, their main suppliers of sugarcane, who are all stationed near or in Guitang City Quality of sugar product is very important to the Group. As of 2003, the Shenzhen Huaqiang Holdings Limited, a private Chinese company, owned all of the entire Guitang Group facilities. The group as a whole, as of 2003, consists of 3800 workers and operates on 14,700 hectares of land. It contains a sugar plant, an alcohol plant, a calcium carbonate plant, a cement plant, a power plant, and several other affiliated units. The non-sugar products account for 40% of revenue and near as much as that in profits and taxes paid. Despite the usually high pollutant-nature of the industries associated with the Group, the strategies employed by the Group have allowed it to meet all local and environmental standards.

Product	Total Output (tons)
White Sugar	150,000
Raw Sugar	300,000
Pulp	150,000
Paper	200,000
Alcohol	10,000
Cement	330,000
Fertilizer	30,000
Alkali	35,000

(figure above from)

There are two main supply chains of the process: alcohol and paper. All of the products heavily rely on co- and by-products of the other products. The fertilizer that the Group creates is sold back to the farmers who supply them with sugar cane. The Group produces the best quality sugar in China according to an aggregate score according to color, sulfur, and impurity content, and has a large market share. In 2000 the sugar price was an average of 30-35% above the other Chinese sugar refineries because of its high quality.

== Environmental considerations ==
As the GG area produces more than 50% of China’s entire sugar output, the production choices they make heavily influence the region. Before the year 2000, sugar refineries produced 300,000 tonnes of molasses and 200,000 tonnes of bagasse waste. Now that the GG has added new markets these byproducts are used as raw materials. Now that these byproducts are useful, the bottleneck for production in the region has opened up, thus allowing expanded production. In recent years the Guitang Group has expanded and made efforts to keep and gain markets for its traditional products of sugar and paper products so as to “reduce pollution and disposal costs and to seek more revenues by utilizing by-products.”. Before cement production was added to the group, soil damage was caused by the sugar refineries. Filter mud is a byproduct of the sugar process and was originally used as a fertilizer despite the damage it did to soil. Instead, the filter mud is now used in the cement production and residues from the alcohol plant (molasses) are used to create a compound fertilizer in the sugarcane fields.

The GG achieved its ISO 9001 certificate in 1998. This comes from a third party organization that audits and recognizes quality management systems for environmental progress. Soon after in 2000, the State Environmental Protection Administration (SEPA) of China started promoting the Guitang Group for its strong economic performance and responsible use of environmental resources. With this approval and backing the GG has committed itself to promoting and expanding its operation as a model of a modern eco-industrial park.

== Future outlook ==
Older refinery technologies and equipment used by the Guitang Group along with farmers bringing more marginal land into production make environmental risks higher and production values lower. However, as more revenue comes to the area, modern technology comes with it. As long as supplies of sugarcane feed the complex, the GG looks to continue the strides it’s made in creating a sustainable regional industry.
