= Amuru Sugar Works Limited =

Proposed sugar estate in Uganda

Coordinates: 02°54′13″N 31°41′58″E

- Company type: Private
- Industry: Manufacture & distribution of sugar
- Headquarters: Amuru District, Uganda
- Key people: Madhvani Group
- Products: Sugar

Amuru Sugar Works Limited (ASWL) is a proposed sugar manufacturing company in the Northern Region of Uganda.

== Location ==
The factory and sugar plantation would be located south of the Zoka Forest in Amuru District, Acholi sub-region. This location would be approximately 130 kilometres (81 mi), by road, north-west of Gulu, the largest city in the Northern Region of Uganda.

== Overview ==
Sometime before 2010, the Madhvani Group applied to lease 40,000 acres (63 mi^{2}) in Amuru District to establish a commercial sugar plantation and a factory. Uganda's central and district governments consented to the deal, but the resident communities, through their traditional leaders, objected. In September 2010, parliament members from the Acholi sub-region sued the Madhvani Group and the traditional chiefs over the "land giveaway". In 2012, the Madhvani Group won that case. The most contentious issues are "who owns the land?" and "who has the right to determine how that land can be used?"

== New developments ==
On 13 January 2015, State House announced that the community had agreed to withdraw the court case and accept compensation for the land in contention.

If and when the sugar estate is built, it will sit on 40,000 hectares (150 mi^{2}). 20,000 hectares (77 mi^{2}) will be a nucleus estate for the factory and the remaining acreage will be leased out to sugarcane outgrowers. An estimated 7,000 outgrowers are expected to benefit and the sugar estate and factory are expected to create an estimated 8,000 jobs. The entire project is budgeted at approximately US$100 million.

== See also ==
- Kakira Sugar Works
