= GM Sugar Uganda Limited =

Sugar manufacturing company of Uganda

Coordinates: 00°24′43″N 33°08′10″E

- Company type: Private
- Industry: Manufacture and marketing of sugar
- Founded: 2006
- Headquarters: Njeru, Buikwe District, Uganda
- Key people: Milan Dobariya chief executive officer
- Products: Sugar

GM Sugar Uganda Limited, also GM Sugar Limited or GM Sugar, is a manufacturer of sugar in Uganda.

== Location ==
The company headquarters and factory are in the town of Njeru in Buikwe District, on the Kampala–Jinja Highway, about 13.5 kilometres (8 mi), west of the central business district of Jinja, the nearest large town. This is about 69 kilometres (43 mi) east of Kampala, the capital and largest city of Uganda. The coordinates of the company headquarters are 0°24'43.0"N, 33°08'10.0"E (Latitude:0.411939; Longitude:33.136106).

== Overview ==
GM Sugar Uganda Limited was established in 2006. The company is a member of the Millers Association of Sugarcane, an industry group of sugar manufacturers in Uganda.

== See also ==
- List of sugar manufacturers in Uganda
