= Kaliro =

Kaliro Kaliro town council
- Location in Uganda
- Coordinates: 00°53′42″N 33°30′18″E
- Country: Uganda
- Region: Eastern Uganda
- Sub-region: Busoga sub-region
- District: Kaliro District

Government
  - Mayor: Sam Gamutambuli
- Elevation: 3,540 ft (1,080 m)

Population (2014 Census)
  - Total: 16,796

Kaliro is a town in the Eastern Region of Uganda. It is the main municipal, administrative, and commercial center of Kaliro District and the site of the district headquarters.

== Location ==
Kaliro is approximately 40 kilometres (25 mi) north of Iganga, the nearest large town, on an all-weather tarmacked road. This is approximately 153 kilometres (95 mi), by road, northeast of Kampala, Uganda's capital and largest city. The coordinates of the town are 0°53'42.0"N, 33°30'18.0"E (Latitude:0.8950; Longitude:33.5050).

== Population ==
In 2002, the national population census estimated the town's population at 39,900. In 2010, the Uganda Bureau of Statistics (UBOS) estimated the population at 13,300. In 2011, UBOS estimated the population at 13,700. In 2014, the national census put the population at 16,796.

== Administration ==
Kaliro is led by an elected mayor and elected town council. As of 2017, the mayor is Sam Gamutambuli.

== Points of interest ==
The following points of interest lie within the town or close to its borders:

- Zibondo’s palace - The palace of Ezekieri Tenywa Wako Zibondo IX, Isebantu (King) of Busoga from 15 March 1893 until 18 April 1952, is located less than 2 kilometres (1.2 mi) east of the central business district of Kaliro. The palace was built in 1930.
- Buguge historical site - The site is located about 15 kilometres (9.3 mi) north of Kaliro in Saaka Parish, Namwiwa sub-county. The site is believed to have been the settlement of the first Lamogi (Chief) from the Babiito rulers of the Biito Dynasty of Bunyoro. At the site are two graves, located 100 metres (330 ft) apart, said to be of the first Lamogi (Chief) and his escort (Mukama) from the Biito Dynasty of Bunyoro
- offices of Kaliro Town Council
- Kaliro central market
- National Teachers' College Kaliro, one of the five government teacher training institutions for secondary school teachers.

== See also ==
- Kyabazinga
- Henry Wako Muloki
- Busoga sub-region
- List of cities and towns in Uganda
