= Kaliro District =

- District
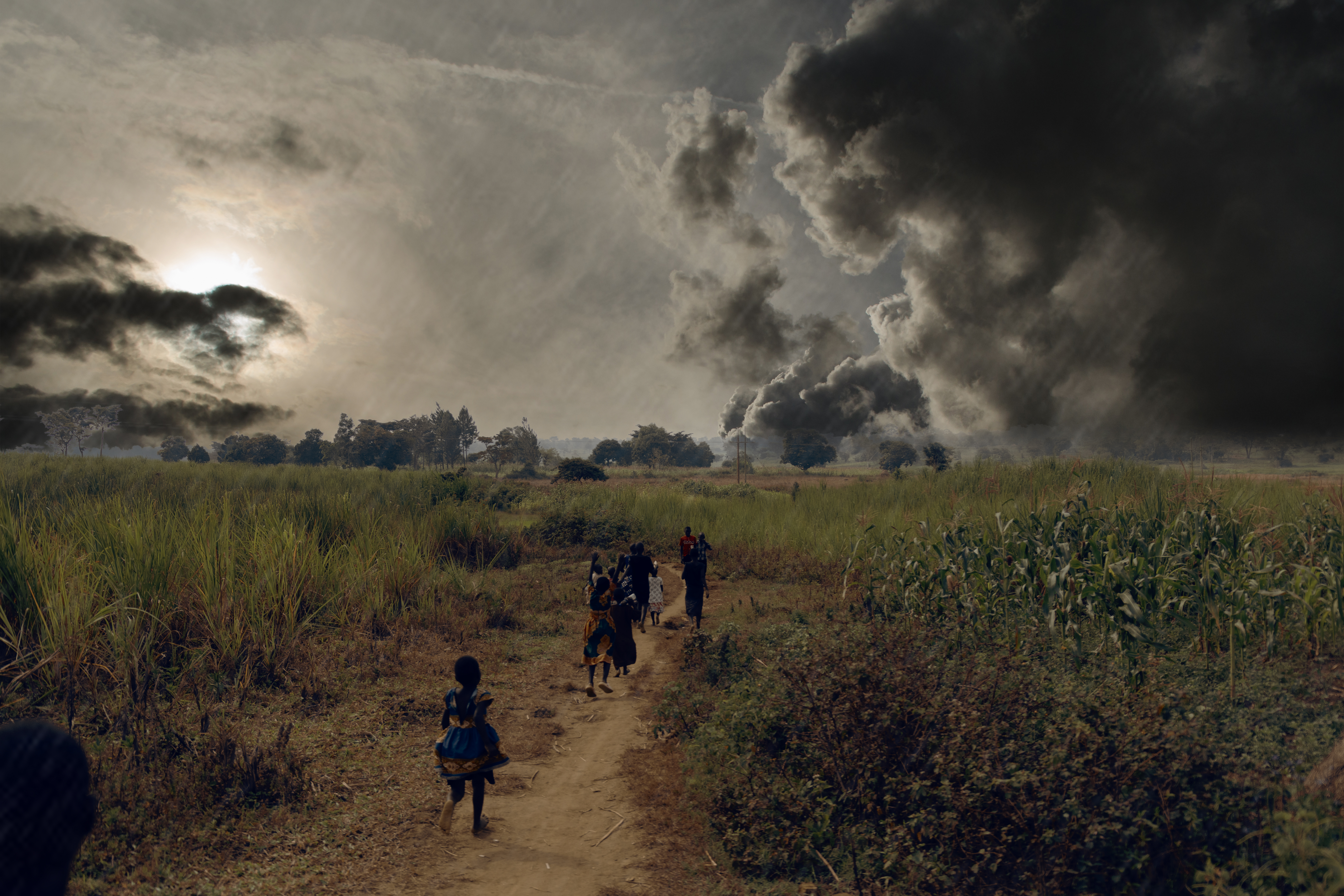

- District location in Uganda
- Coordinates: 00°54′N 33°30′E
- Country: Uganda
- Region: Eastern Region of Uganda
- Sub-region: Busoga sub-region
- Established: 1 July 2006
- Capital: Kaliro

Area
  - Total: 1,062.7 km^{2} (410.3 sq mi)
  - Land: 868.7 km^{2} (335.4 sq mi)
  - Water: 194 km^{2} (75 sq mi)
- Elevation: 1,100 m (3,600 ft)

Population (2012 Estimate)
  - Total: 216,500
  - Density: 249.2/km^{2} (645/sq mi)
- Time zone: UTC+3 (EAT)
- Website: www.kaliro.go.ug

Kaliro District is a district in the Eastern Region of Uganda. It was created out of the eastern part of Kamuli District in 2006. Kaliro is the site of the district headquarters.

== Administration and management ==
Kaliro district for its effective Management and Administration it was further divided in several administrative units and these are Bulamogi county and Bulamogi North West county. The two county are also divided into small administrative units that is to say Sub-county, Parish and village.

Bulamogi county has over 11 subcouty and town council and these include:

- Kaliro Town Council
- Bulumba Town Council
- Namwiwa Town Council
- Budomero
- Bumanya
- Buyinda
- Gadumire
- Kasokwe
- Kisinda
- Namugongo
- Namwiwa

Bulamogi North West county is made up of four (4) sub-county and town council.

1. Bukamba
2. Nansololo
3. Nawaikoke
4. Nawaikoke Town Council

== Location ==
Kaliro District borders Serere District to the north, across Lake Nakuwa, one, of the lakes that comprise the Lake Kyoga water complex. Pallisa District lies to the northeast, Namutumba District to the southeast, Iganga District to the south, Luuka District to the southwest, and Buyende District to the northwest. The town of Kaliro is approximately 40 kilometres (25 mi) north of Iganga, the nearest large town.

== Population ==
In 1991, the national population census estimated the population of the district at 105,100. The 2002 Uganda national census put the population at approximately 154,700, of whom 49.5 percent were males and 50.5 percent were females. The annual population growth rate was calculated at 3.5%. In 2012, the population of Kaliro District was estimated at 216,500. The 2014 Uganda national census estimated a population of 236199 and in 2024 the estimated population was 286397.

== Economic activity ==
- Maize
- surgar cane
- Beans
- Irish Potatoes

== Livestocks ==
- Chicken
- Pig
- Cattle
- Goat
- Sheep

== See also ==
- Busoga sub-region
- Districts of Uganda
- Parliament of Uganda
- Busoga
- Uganda
