= Replicas of the White House =

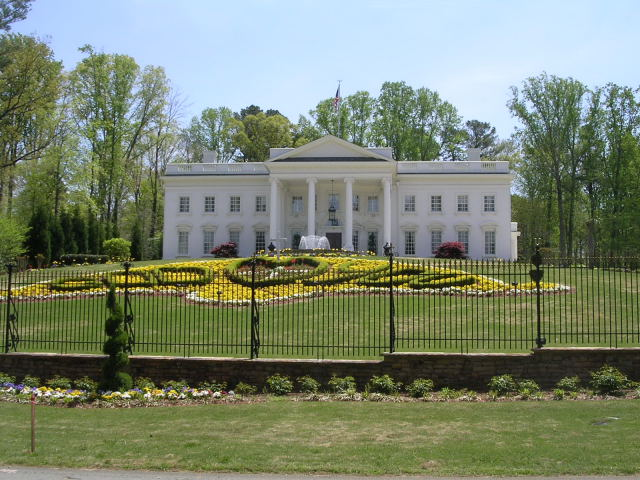
White House replica in Atlanta, Georgia

Replicas of the White House are reproductions of the home of the president of the United States, the White House. Notable examples include:

- DeKalb County, Georgia: A 16,500-square-foot (1,530 m^{2}) model exists. It was built in 2001 by Atlanta home builder Fred Milani, an American citizen born in Iran.
- McLean, Virginia: Not far from the actual White House, an anonymous refugee engineer from Vietnam built a 12,020-square-foot (1,117 m^{2}) White House replica as a tribute to his new country. In 2011 he put it up for sale after his two children moved out, citing empty nest syndrome.
- Hangzhou, China: A replica of the White House has been built near Hangzhou, China.
- Erbil, Iraq: A replica of the White House has been built in the capital city of the Kurdistan Region of Iraq.
- Clermont, Florida: A 1/12 scale replica of the White House resides at the Presidents Hall of Fame, one of Florida's oldest remaining original roadside attractions (House of Presidents).
- Carlsbad, California and Winter Haven, Florida: Two replicas of the White House are built in Lego bricks and in the Miniland section of Legoland California and Legoland Florida.
- Klagenfurt, Austria: Replica at the Minimundus miniature park.
- Wisconsin Dells, Wisconsin: The "Top Secret" attraction is a replica of the White House built upside down. The entrance is located in the basement and inside there are replicas of the White House furnitures, the U.S. Constitution, etc.
- Chornomyn Palace in Chornomyn village, Vinnytsia Oblast, Ukraine: building is a former landowner's palace, nowadays local school is situated in its walls.
- Springfield, Illinois: A 7/8 replica of the south portico of the White House is a prominent part of the Abraham Lincoln Presidential Museum.
- Tyler Perry Studios: A filming location at a film studio complex.
- Darien, Illinois: Built in 1903 by congressman Martin B. Madden, the house is a one-tenth scale model of the White House that features rooms that were modeled after the East Room and the Oval Office. The house was named, Castle Eden, by the original owners. The house is being demolished.
- Uganda in Akright City, Entebbe: Built in 2019 by Dr. Hamis Kiggundu.
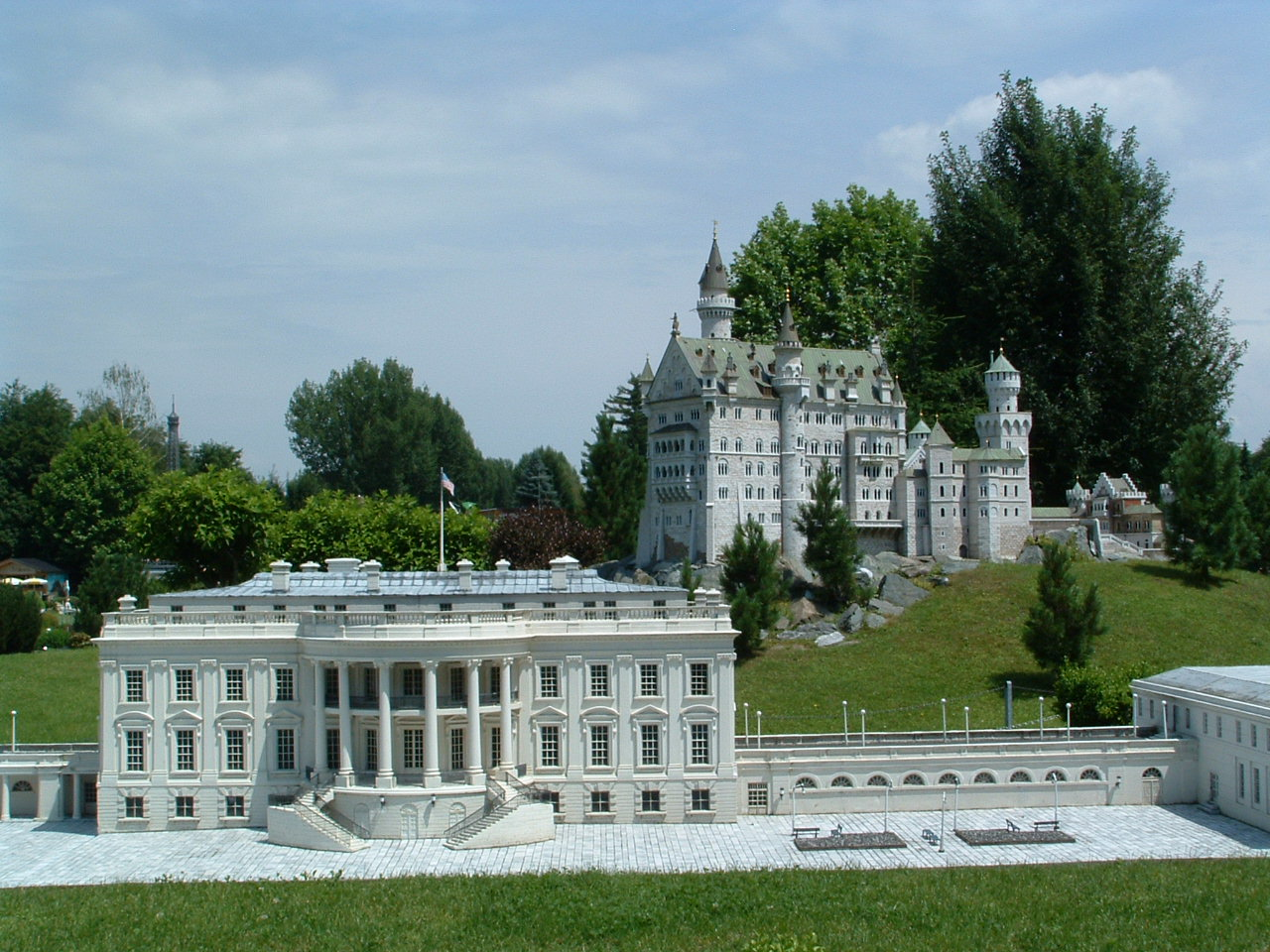
White House scale model at Minimundus, Klagenfurt, Austria

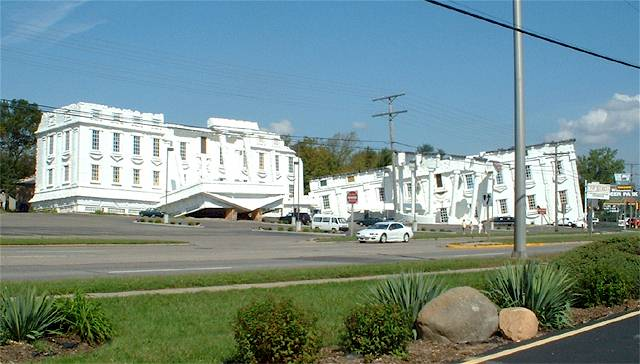
"Top Secret" (2002), Wisconsin Dells, Wisconsin

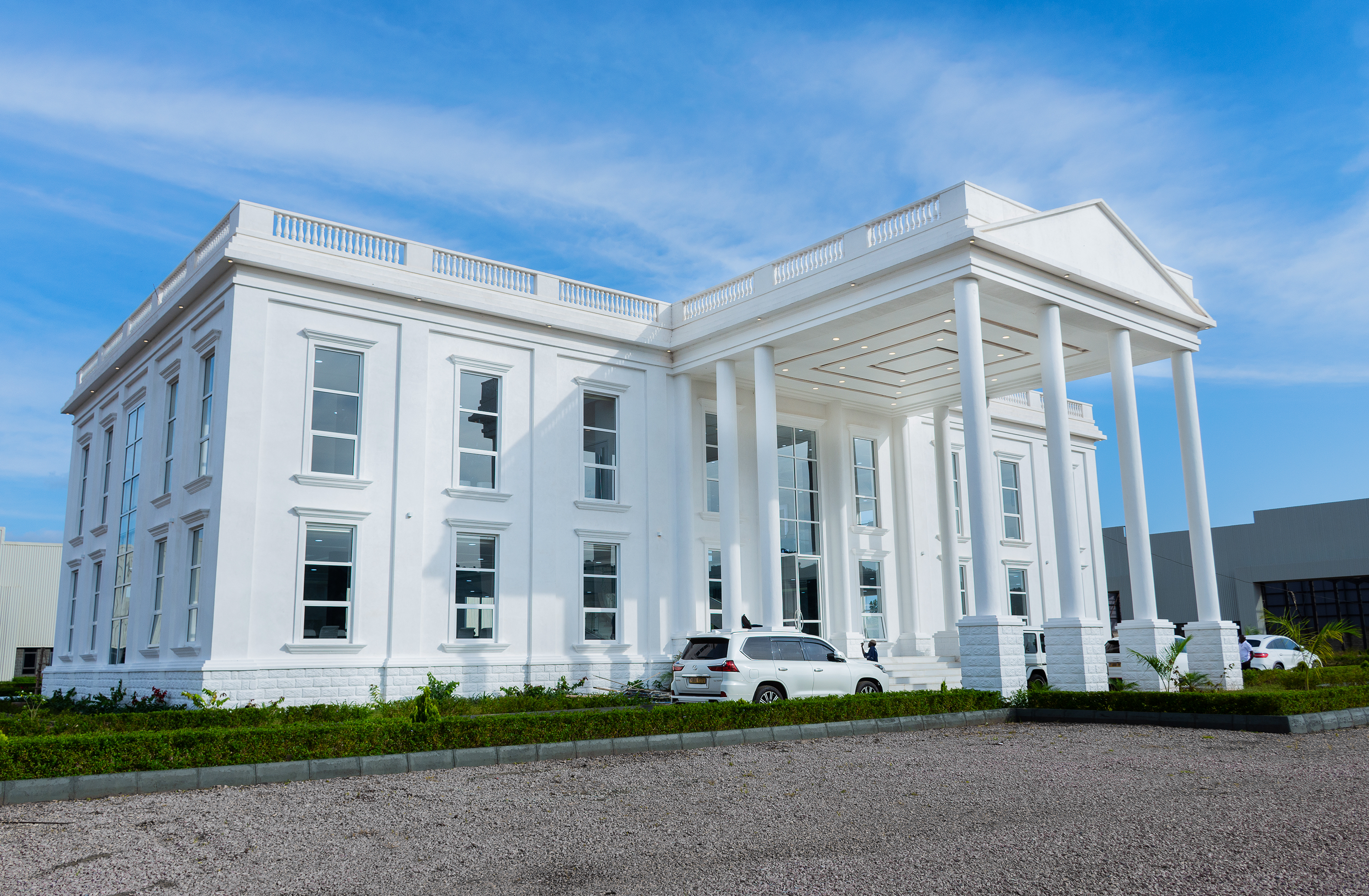
White House replica at Akright City, Entebbe, Uganda
