= Kwagalana Group =

Business group

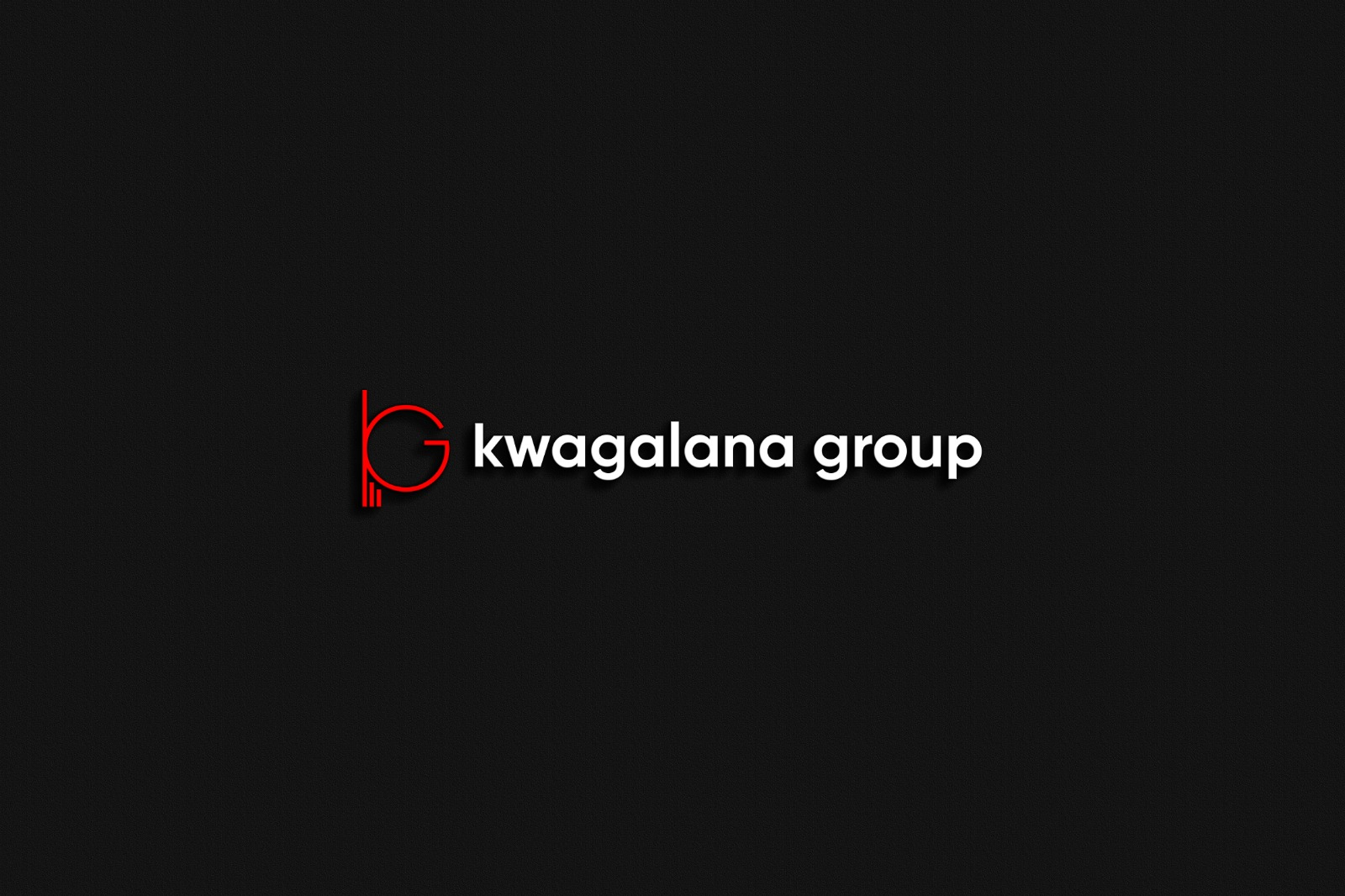
- Type: Business group
- Area served: Uganda
- Key people: Godfrey Kirumira (Chairperson)
- Members: Sudhir Ruparelia, Joseph Magandaazi Yiga, Hamis Kiggundu and more
- Website: kwagalanagroup.com

Kwagalana Group is a members only group of richest businessmen and women in Uganda. Together, the group led by Godfrey Kirumira was estimated to be worth over UGX1,000 billion/USD272 million in 2009. The group was started in 2002 by a group of rich men, but the membership has since grown to include several businessmen like Sudhir Ruparelia of Ruparelia Group Joseph Magandaazi Yiga, Dr. Hamis Kiggundu of Ham Group among several other rich Ugandans.

== Philanthropy ==
The Kwagalana Group is known for its work of philanthropy by its members. The members of the group have been known to contribute to the communities and the country's development through business and charity. Sudhir Ruparelia in particular has a foundation has benefited several children and women.

During the COVID-19 Pandemic, the Kwagalana Group donated a pickup truck to the health ministry to help transport materials to different health facilities. This followed a call for donations from Yoweri Museveni Members also made individual contributions to the same cause.

== Business ==
Members of Kwagalana Group own several businesses in Uganda, including hotels, Fuel Companies, Schools, Real Estate Companies among others. These include; Kirumira's Bargary Company Limited deals in fuel, and Sudhir's hotels, apartments, schools etc. Other members of Kwagalana Group include, Joseph Yiga, the proprietor Steel and Tube Industries Dr Sarah Nkonge, who owns several arcades in Kampala and Jinja. She was also the first woman to be appointed Kampala City Mayor. Mr Ben Kavuya, the Proprietor Legacy Group and Hamis Kiggundu the proprietor Ham Group, among other members.
