= Hamz Stadium, Nakivubo War Memorial Grounds =

Stadium in Kampala, Uganda

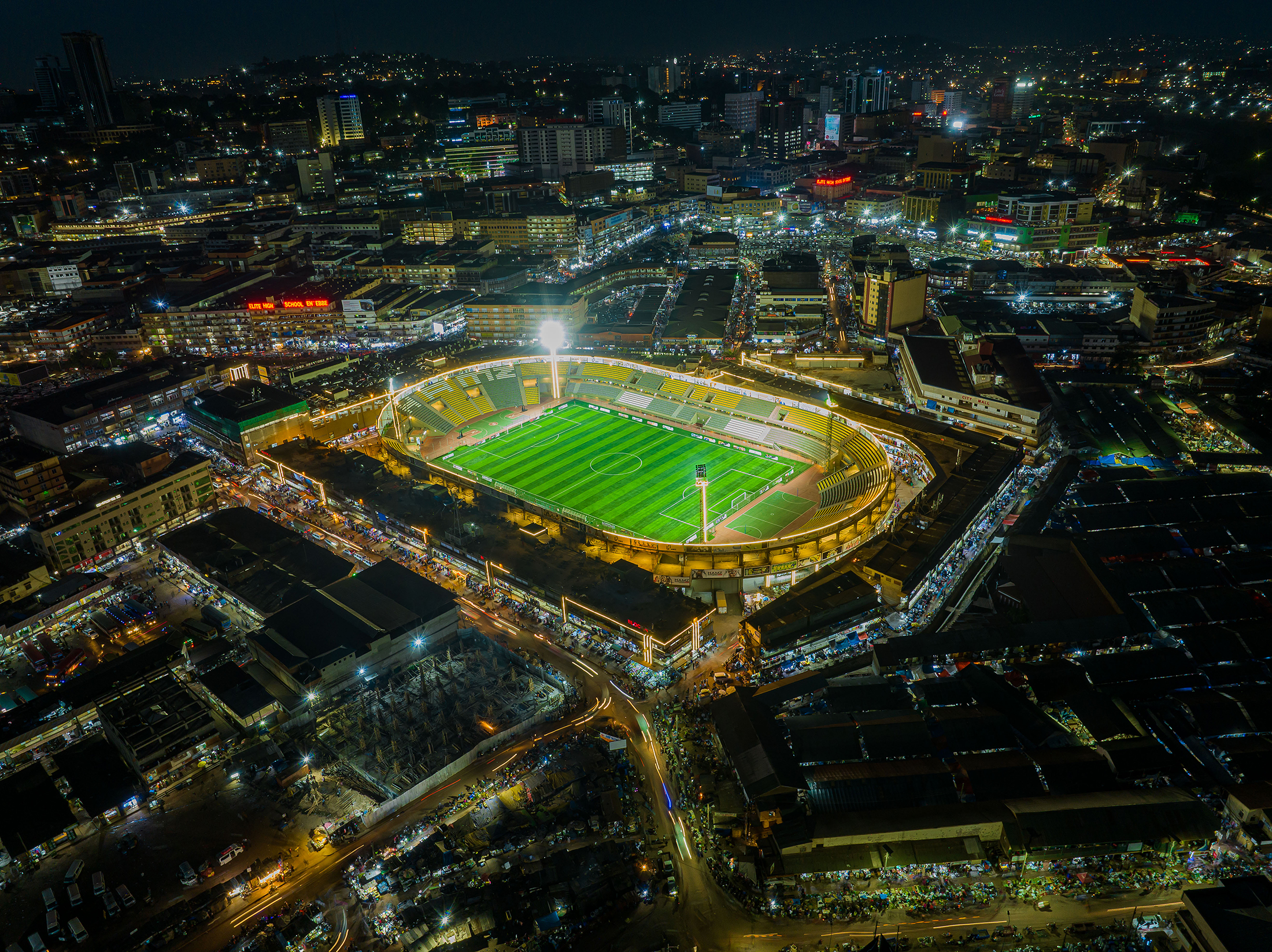
- CAF

- Location within Kampala
- Former names: Nakivubo Stadium
- Address: Nakivubo War Memorial Grounds; Kampala; Uganda
- Location: Nakivubo War Memorial Grounds; Kampala,
- Coordinates: 0.311667°N 32.573611°E
- Owner: Government of Uganda
- Operator: Dr. Hamis Kiggundu
- Capacity: 35,000
- Executive suites: 40
- Surface: AstroTurf
- Field size: 115 yd × 74 yd (105 m × 68 m)

Construction
- Opened: 1 April 1926
- Renovated: 1954, 2013, 2017
- Reopened: 1 June 2024
- Demolished: 28 February 2017 (Commissioned 25 April 2024)
- Cost: US$200,000,000
- Architect: Christopher Omara (Bwap Studios)
- Structural engineer: Ivan Ssewankambo (ISB Construction Ltd)

Tenants
- Express FC (2024–present); URA FC (2024–present)

Website
- Home Page

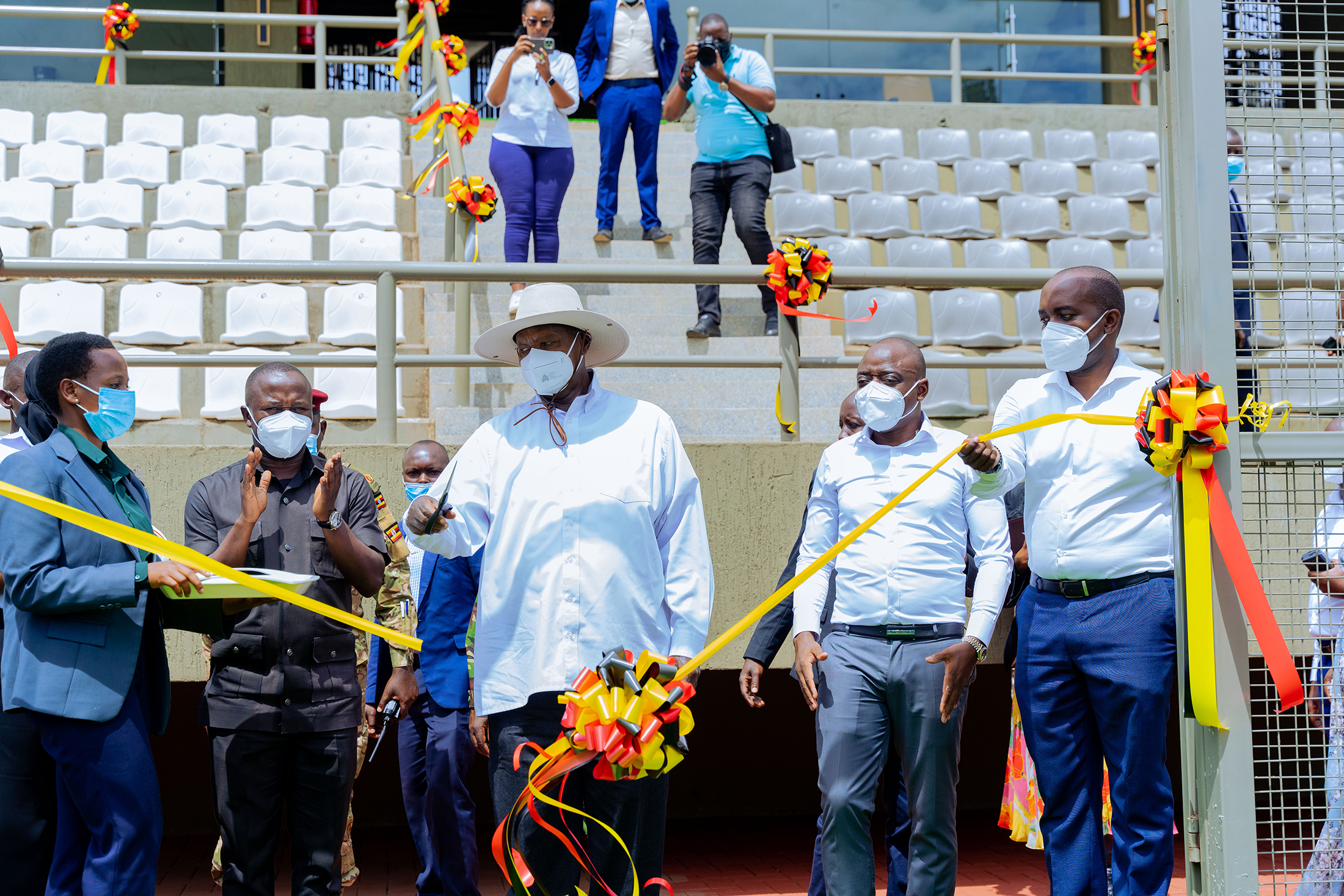
President Museveni Commissioning the Stadium on April 25, 2024

Hamz Stadium, Nakivubo War Memorial Grounds, formerly referred to as Nakivubo Stadium is a multi-purpose stadium in Kampala, Uganda. The Hamz Stadium is used mostly for association football and also sometimes for basketball.

Following extensive renovations led by businessman Haji Dr. Hamis Kiggundu in partnership with the Ugandan government, the stadium was upgraded to meet Confederation of African Football (CAF) requirements. The facility auditioned with significant events like CAF U17 and CHAN 2024 in December 2024 which were among the first major international fixtures hosted at the renovated stadium. It is slated to host the AFCON2027. As of December 2024; Two Uganda premier league clubs URA FC and Express FC use Hamz stadium as their home ground. The stadium was commissioned by President Museveni on 25 April 2024. It has a total seating capacity of 35000 people.

== Location ==
The stadium is located in the Central Business District of Kampala City at Nakivubo War Memorial Grounds, surrounded by Ham Shopping Grounds, within a walking distance from the New Taxi Park. It sits on two adjacent parcels of land measuring 11.62 acres (47,000 m^{2}) and 0.835 acres (3,380 m^{2}), totaling 12.455 acres (50,400 m^{2}).

== History ==
=== Early Development ===
Originally established in 1926 on land donated by the Kabaka of Buganda. It hosted its first match on 1 April 1926 between the Uganda National Team and the Under-18 National team of Uganda.

It became a central venue for football in Uganda, hosting various local and international matches.

In 1954, the stadium was renamed Nakivubo War Memorial Stadium to honor Ugandan soldiers who lost their lives during World War II. The renaming followed legislative action under the Nakivubo War Memorial Stadium Trust Act passed by the Parliament of Uganda. It was later renamed Nakivubo Stadium at Nakivubo War Memorial Grounds.

However, by the early 21st century, the stadium had fallen into disrepair, reflecting the broader challenges of maintaining public infrastructure in Kampala.

== Redevelopment ==
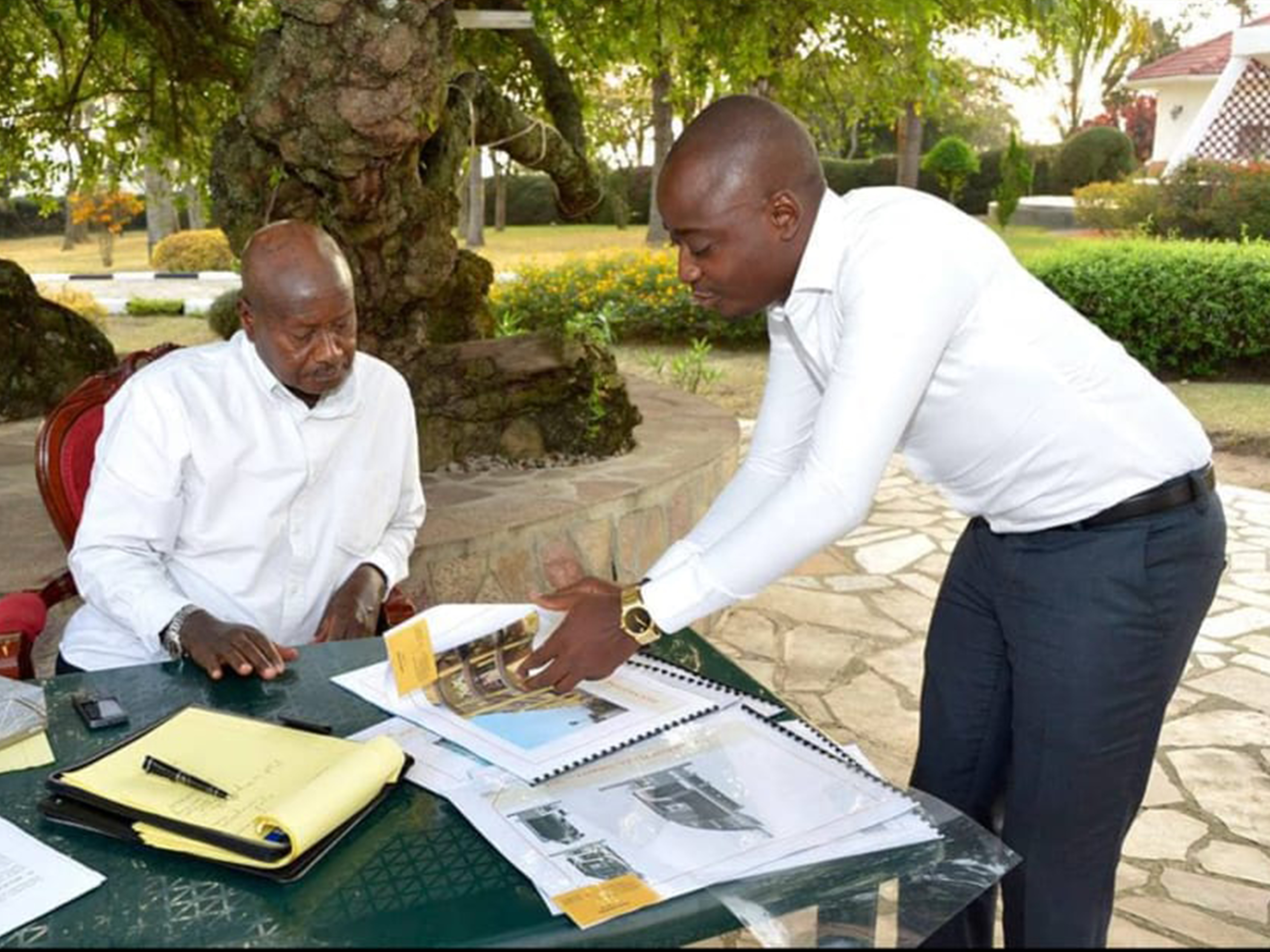
Dr. Hamis Kiggundu presents a redevelopment proposal to President Museveni in Dec 2014

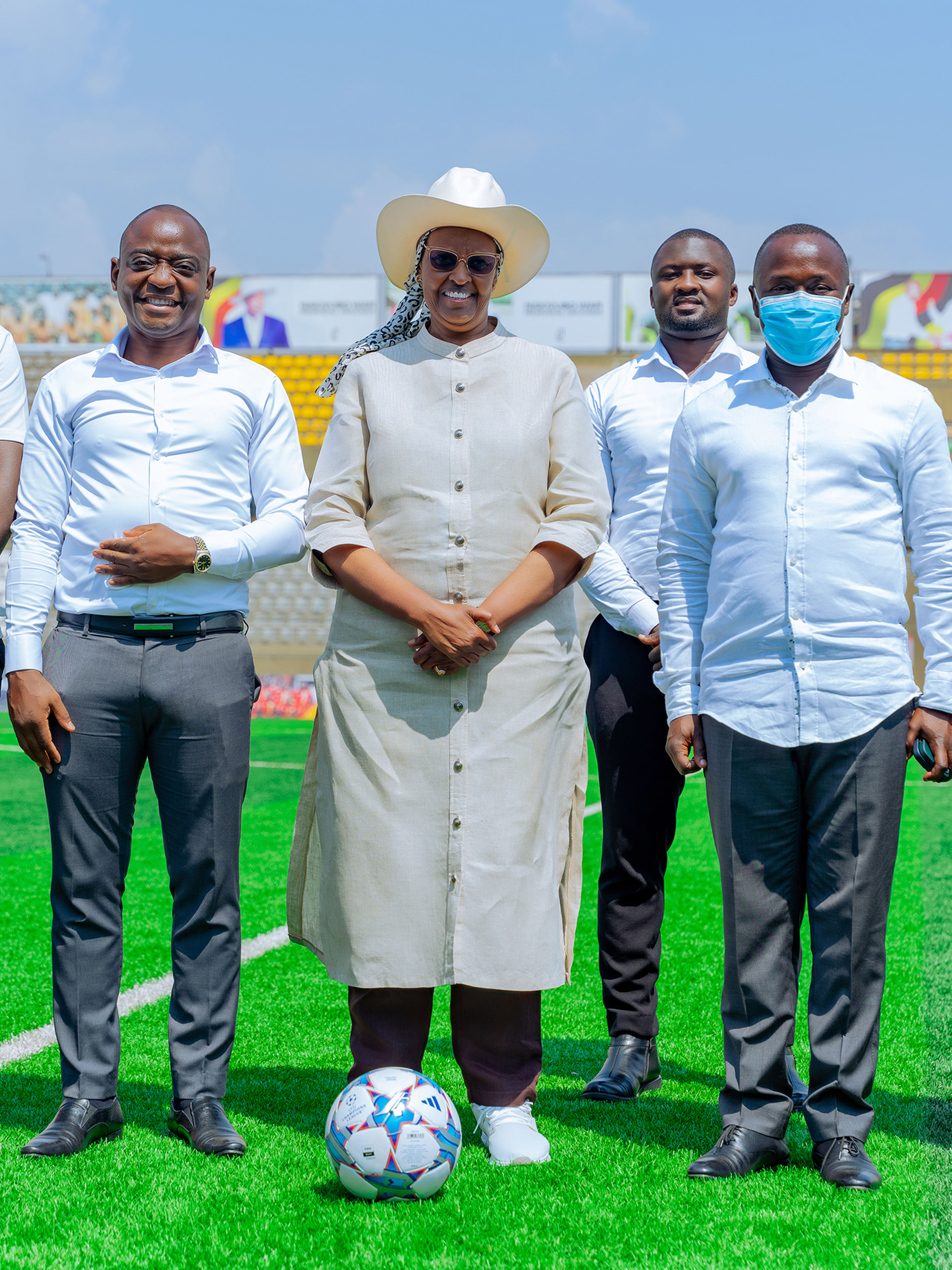
Hamis Kiggundu with the Ugandan First Lady and minister of Education and Sports during Stadium Inspection in February 2024

In 2015, Ham Enterprises, led by Haji Dr. Hamis Kiggundu, collaborated with the Ugandan government to renovate and upgrade the stadium. In 2017, all the deteriorated structures were completely demolished, followed by the commencement of new construction works. In December 2023, the Nile Post a Ugandan online publication, reported that after the ongoing renovations were completed the name of the stadium would be changed to Hamz Stadium Nakivubo. The renovated stadium was commissioned by Yoweri Museveni, the Ugandan Head of State on 25 April 2024. The renovated stadium has a seating capacity of 35,000, broken down as follows (i) 20,000 ordinary seats (ii) 10,000 VIP seats (iii) 5,000 VVIP seats and (iv) 40 executive boxes and other added modern facilities, with a total investment approximately US$200 million.

=== Features and Facilities ===
The new stadium includes a football pitch certified by FIFA, athletics tracks, a basketball court, and a boxing ring. It also includes VIP lounges, executive boxes, and health and emergency facilities. The artificial playing turf was certified by FIFA for the period 4 October 2024 to 3 October 2027.

== Opening ceremony ==
The stadium was officially opened on 1 June 2024 in Kampala. The ceremony began at 7:00 PM and included a 10-minute fireworks display. During the opening event URA FC defeated Kitara FC with a 3–0 in a football match. The ceremony also featured musical performances by Ugandan artists including Rema Namakula, Eddy Kenzo, Cindy, Bebe Cool, Alien Skin, among others. The event included football and boxing competitions. SC Villa won the football match, while Zahara Nandawula won in amateur boxing and Isaac Zebra Jr. won in professional boxing. Security for the event was provided by the Uganda People's Defence Forces (UPDF). During the ceremony, one spectator required medical attention and was treated on-site. The opening ceremony was attended by several public officials, including Vice Presidents: Gilbert Bukenya and Edward Kiwanuka Ssekandi, FUFA President Moses Magogo, and Vision Group CEO Don Wanyama. Attendees were provided with food and refreshments during the event. In remarks at the event, Dr. Hamis Kiggundu stated that the stadium was prepared to host future sports and cultural activities. The opening ceremony concluded at 5:30 AM following a series of sporting and entertainment activities.

== FIFA Certification ==
In October 2024, FIFA certified the artificial turf at Hamz Stadium. According to a certificate signed by FIFA President Gianni Infantino, the playing surface met the organisation's requirements for international matches. The certification allows the stadium to host international fixtures in accordance with FIFA regulations. It has been cited in relation to Uganda's preparations for the 2027 Africa Cup of Nations.

=== Socioeconomic Impact ===
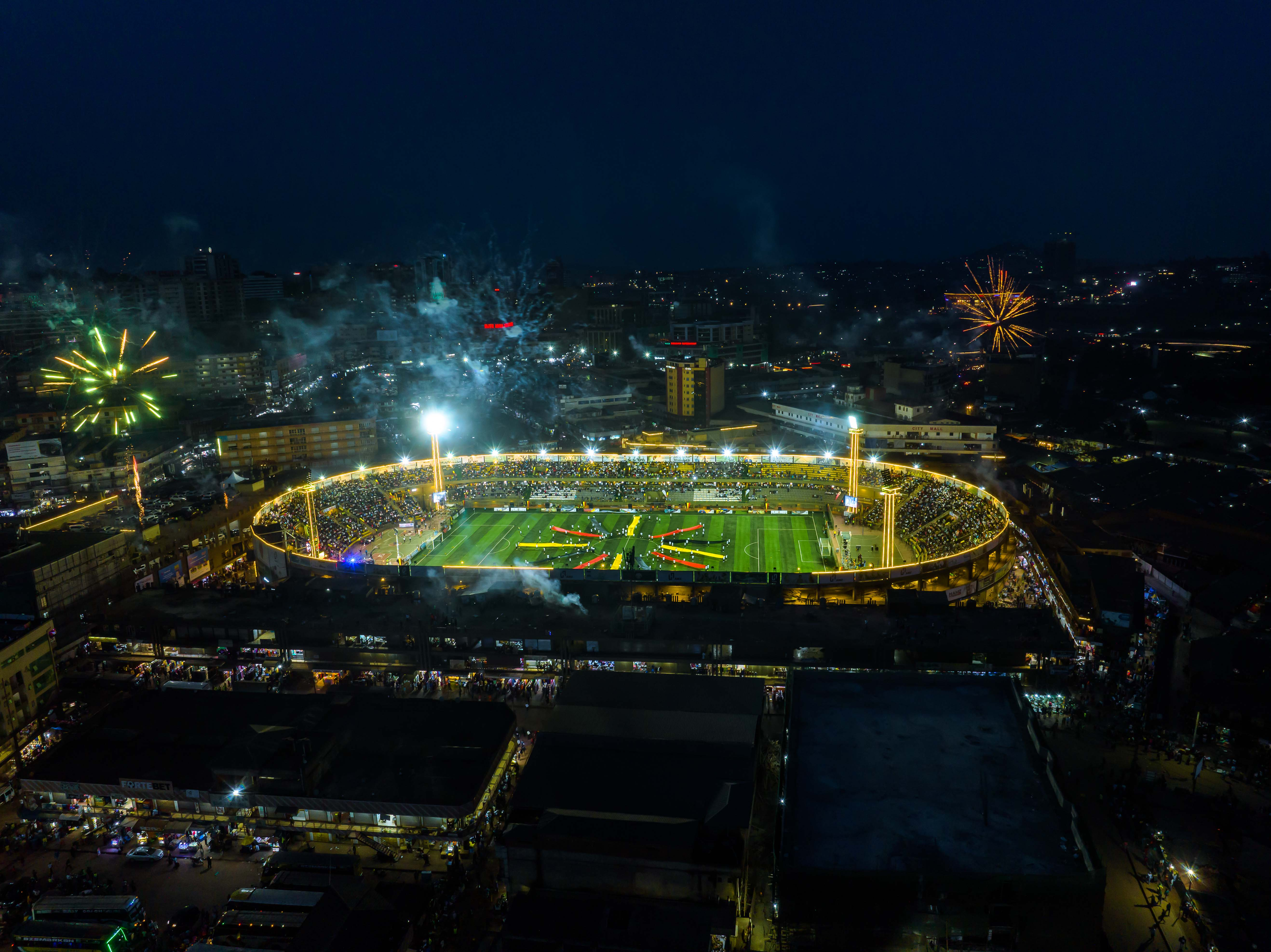
Stadium Grand Opening on June 1, 2024

According to The Spy Uganda and the New Vision, the redevelopment created temporary construction employment and increased commercial activity in the surrounding area. Officials stated that the stadium may host future international events.

== Football Events ==
The facility is set to host major sporting events, including AFCON 2027 and has already held the CHAN 2024 and CAF U-17 highlighting Uganda's capacity to organize international sports competitions.

== Controversies ==
The renovation project faced initial skepticism and resistance from local communities and market vendors, concerned about the potential loss of heritage and public space.

== Recognition ==
In January 2025, Hamz Stadium was included in the shortlist for StadiumDB.com's annual Stadium of the Year public poll, which recognizes football venues completed in the preceding calendar year. The award is decided by a global public vote organized by StadiumDB.com and its affiliated platforms.

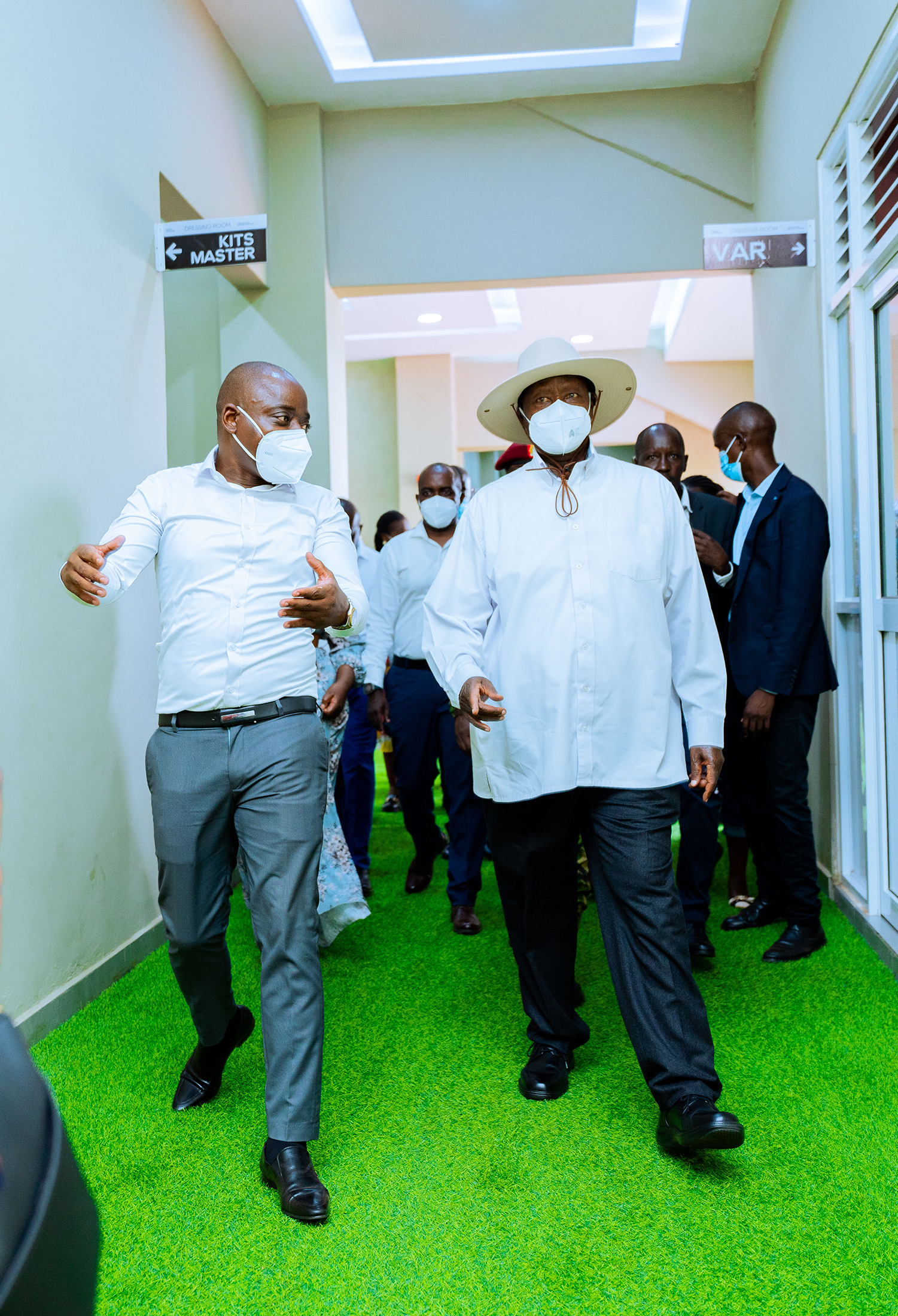
President Museveni Touring the Stadium Facilities With the developer Hamis Kiggundu
