= Yiga =

Yiga may refer to:

- Joseph Magandaazi Yiga (born 1957), Ugandan businessman and entrepreneur
- A clan of assassins who are characters of the Legend of Zelda series
- Yiga Choeling Monastery in Ghum, West Bengal, India
- -yiga, a semblative case suffix in the indigenous Australian Wagiman language
- The Yiga Clan, a group of evil, banana-loving ninjas in the Legend of Zelda
