= Mansour Matovu =

Ugandan businessman and real estate investor

- Born: Mansour Matovu; Masaka District, Uganda
- Other name: Yanga
- Occupations: Businessman, Real estate investor
- Years active: 1980s–present
- Known for: Major real estate developments in Kampala
- Notable work: MM Plaza, Nanganda Plaza, Zai Plaza, Soweto Plaza

Mansour Matovu, commonly known as Yanga, is a Ugandan businessman and real estate investor that owns and has developed various commercial buildings in the Central Business District of Kampala (CBD). According to Watchdog Uganda, he was listed as one of the top 10 Uganda's Billionaires in 2025 with a net worth of $785 million.

== Early life ==
Matovu was born in Masaka District where he attended school up to Senior Two (S.2) before dropping out to engage in small scale trading and vehicle repairs which he began at Kayondo Garage, Ndeeba, a Kampala suburb in the 1980s.

== Business career ==
He began his business career in the 1981 dealing in automobile repair, spare parts, and importation of second-hand motorcycles from Japan. In the 1990s, he shifted to real estate, purchasing land in downtown Kampala and constructing new commercial buildings to replace older structures.

By the early 2000s, Matovu was recognized as one of Kampala’s most prominent landlords. Mulengera News lists him among key figures who shaped the city’s modern property market through the development of shopping arcades and plazas.

== Properties and holdings ==
Matovu’s real estate portfolio includes several buildings across Kampala’s Central Business District, notably MM Plaza, Nanaganda Plaza, Zai Plaza, and Soweto Plaza. These properties are located along Wilson Road, Nakasero, and Kampala Road, areas considered to be prime commercial zones in Uganda’s capital.

== Controversies ==
In March 2019, Matovu was reported to locked up 17 commercial buildings, affecting approximately 7,000 tenants, citing rental disputes and planned renovations. He has also been associated with ownership disagreements related to Qualicel Bus Terminal and other properties in central Kampala. Matovu was involved in a legal battle with the late businessman Charles Muhangi and Drake Lubega over the ownership of Qualicel Bus Terminal and Nabukeera Plaza.

== See also ==
- Hamis Kiggundu
- Haruna Ssentongo
