= Anatoli Kamugisha =

Ugandan businessman and entrepreneur

- Born: 1963 (age 62–63); Uganda
- Citizenship: Uganda
- Education: Kyambogo University (did not graduate)
- Occupations: Investor & businessman
- Years active: 1989–present
- Known for: Real estate

Anatoli Kamugisha is a businessman, entrepreneur, and investor in Uganda, the third-largest economy in the East African Community. He is the managing director and chief executive officer of Akright Projects Limited, a Ugandan real estate development company. He also serves as the president of the Uganda Private Property Developers Association (UPDA). He has been reported to be one of the wealthiest individuals in the country, with an estimated net worth of approximately US$77million as of January 2017.

== Early life and education ==
Kamugisha was born in 1963 in Mitooma District, Western Region. He attended local schools and was admitted to Kyambogo Polytechnic, now part of Kyambogo University, to study for a civil engineering degree. However, he left the university before graduating when he ran out of tuition money.

== Work experience ==
In 1989, at age 26, Kamugisha founded his first company, Kanoblic Group Limited, a real estate construction enterprise. He borrowed money from friends to register his business. He won construction contracts from several reputable firms, including Sugar Corporation of Uganda Limited and the Norwegian Forestry Society.

In 1999, he closed down Kanoblic and started Akright Projects Limited, a company that plans, designs, and constructs organized residential communities (satellite cities) in or near urban centers in Uganda, as an alternative to the mushrooming slum problem in Uganda's cities and towns.

Akright has developed several residential estates, including:

- Akright Namanve Housing Estate – Namanve
- Akright Namugongo Housing Estate – Nsasa
- Akright Kirinnya Housing Estate – Kirinnya
- Akright Lubowa Housing Estate – Lubowa
- Akright City – Bwebajja

In a 2020 interview with the Daily Monitor, Kamugisha explained how borrowing from banks nearly destroyed his business empire. At that time, while most of his troubles were behind him, he was not totally out of the weeds yet.

== Kakungulu Housing Estate ==
In 2002, Akright acquired 2 square miles (1,300 acres) of land from the descendants of Badru Kakungulu for the development of the company's largest planned housing estate in the country, Akright Kakungulu Housing Estate, also referred to as Akright City. It is located at Bwebajja, approximately 18 kilometres (11 mi), by road southwest of Kampala, Uganda's capital, along the Kampala–Entebbe Road.
