= Haruna Ssentongo =

Ugandan businessman, real estate developer, entrepreneur, and philanthropist

- Born: Haruna Ssentongo; August 30, 1987 (age 39); Kalungu District, Uganda
- Citizenship: Ugandan
- Education: Kabojja International School; East High School Ntinda; Makerere University
- Occupations: Businessman, Real estate developer, entrepreneur, philanthropist
- Years active: 2011–present
- Known for: Founder of Haruna Enterprises U Ltd
- Notable work: Haruna Towers, Segawa Market (Kisenyi), real estate development in Kampala
- Relatives: Hamis Kiggundu (brother)

Haruna Ssentongo also written as Haruna Sentongo (born on August 30, 1987) is a Ugandan businessman, real estate developer, entrepreneur, and philanthropist. He is the founder of Haruna Enterprises (U) Ltd and as of 2023, his net worth was reported to be US$420 million.

== Early life and education ==
Haruna was born on 30 August 1987 to Haruna Segawa (father) and Nakayiza Jalia (mother) in Kalungu District formally Masaka District in central Uganda. Haruna is a young brother to Hamis Kiggundu a Ugandan businessman, lawyer and author.

Ssentongo had his primary education from Masaka and letter joined Kabojja international School for his O-Level education, and East high Ntinda for his A-Level education. He enrolled and attended at Makerere university during a time before venturing into real estate.

== Business career ==
Ssentongo incorporated Haruna Enterprises in 2011 and went ahead to build Haruna Towers in Wandegeya shortly after. He later diversified into additional commercial buildings and markets in Kampala. Properties and developments included are Haruna Towers, retail and market complexes in Kisenyi and in the city center. By 2022, it was reported that Ssentongo had more than 27 construction projects and owned about 24 acres of land within Kampala's central business and suburban zones.

During the COVID-19 pandemic, he reportedly waived rent for tenants at some of his markets and shopping malls to mitigate economic hardship.

== Notable projects ==
- Haruna Towers, Wandegeya. A commercial building and a business hub.
- Kisenyi developments. He acquired and redevelopment in Kisenyi, including a market complex sometimes referred to as Segawa Market.
- Haruna Mall, Ntinda. A commercial building and a business hub

== Legal disputes ==
In 2019, Orient Bank (now I&M Bank Uganda) sued him for recovery of USh 10.3 billion principal, interest, damages, and costs where the court ordered to pay Shs 10.3 billion, Shs 150 million as damages to I&M Bank, and 22% interest per annum from the date of first default until satisfaction. Ssentongo appealed against Justice Richard Wejuli Wabwire's December 2022 High Court Commercial Division judgment, alleging breach of contract, misrepresentation, negligence, undue influence, economic duress, unfair terms, and unjust enrichment in the shape of excessive interest and charges.

He asked for restitution of wrongful claims, special damages for lost business, permanent injunction of land in Kibuga Block 12 (Plots 250, 251, and 252), punitive damages, and 25% annual interest until payment. His contention arises from loans he took from I&M Bank, such as a May 2015 Shs 1.8 billion to facilitate Nakayiza Mall construction and working capital, an overdraft of Shs 150 million, and a later Shs 2 billion loan in September 2015, all backed by the same property, while he had a previous Shs 1.7 billion loan and overdraft that already incurred penalties.

The Supreme Court later issued a temporary injunction restraining I&M Bank from enforcing sale or seizure of Ssentongo's properties located on Kibuga Block 12, Plots 250, 251, and 252, pending determination of his appeal. Additionally, the Court of Appeal had earlier halted the sale of some of his properties tied to a USh 34 billion debt to Diamond Trust Bank (DTB) Uganda and DTB Kenya, pending resolution of legal appeals.

== See also ==
- Hamis Kiggundu
- Mansour Matovu
