= White House, Uganda =

Ugandan Replica of The White House

White House Uganda
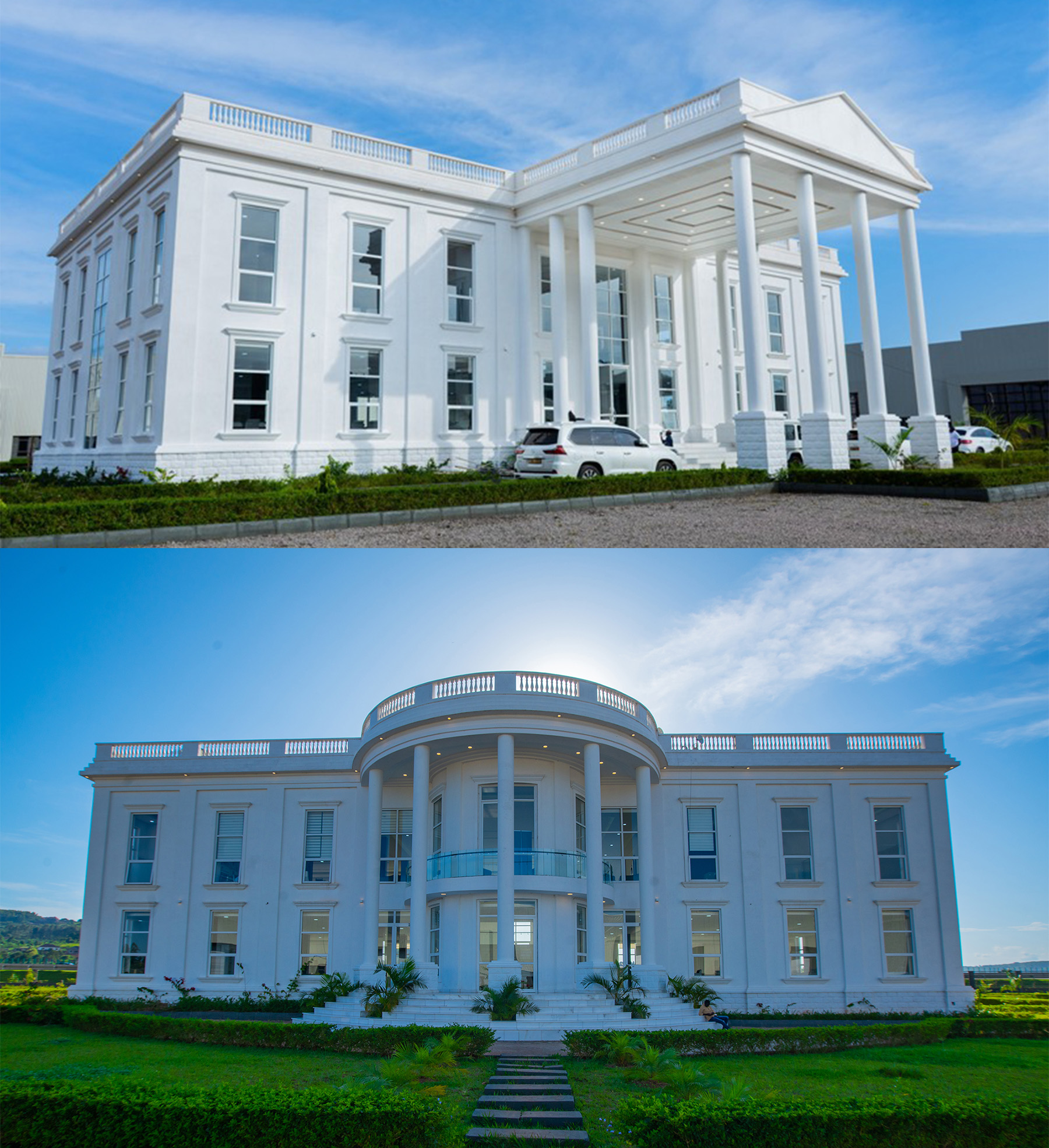
- Top: the front facade facing the Kampala-Entebbe Express Highway; Bottom: the rear facade facing the Ham Agro-Processing Industries in Akright City

- Map of Uganda showing the location of The White House

General information
- Location: Plot 1636 Block 405 Akright City, along Entebbe–Kampala Expressway; Uganda
- Coordinates: 0°10′0″N 32°30′52″E
- Current tenants: Ham Group of Companies, Ham Agro-Processing Industries
- Construction started: 13 December 2019; 6 years ago
- Completed: 21 September 2021; 4 years ago
- Owner: Hamis Kiggundu

Design and construction
- Architect: Christopher Omara
- Engineer: Ivan Ssewankambo (ISB Construction)

The White House Uganda is an architectural structure in Uganda. It is a Ugandan replica of the White House in Washington, D.C., the headquarters of Ham Group of Companies, Ham Agro Processing Industries and a private tourist destination for Uganda.

== Location ==
The building is located in Akright City along the Entebbe–Kampala Expressway and is bordered by Namugongo Road to the north, the community of Bwebajja and Kampala–Entebbe Road to the east, Namulanda to the southeast, Palm Valley Golf and Country Club to the south, and the community of Sekiwunga.

== History ==
Construction began in December 2019 drawing inspiration from the American presidential residence, Kiggundu's project aimed to create a landmark that combines cultural symbolism with functional business use. It was completed in September 2021.

This Ugandan White House is intended to symbolize the aspirations of modern Ugandan entrepreneurship and economic growth, reflecting both a global sensibility and local business acumen.
