= Success and Failure Based on Reason and Reality =

2018 self help book

Success and Failure Based On Reason and Reality
- Book Front Cover
- Author: Hamis Kiggundu
- Language: English, Luganda
- Genre: Personal-success, spirituality
- Published: 23 July 2018
- Publisher: Independently published
- Publication date: 2018
- Publication place: Uganda
- Media type: Paperback, e-book
- Pages: 154
- Awards: Business Motivation Book of the Year 2018, Uganda
- ISBN: 978-1-71986-954-6
- Followed by: Reason as the World Masterpiece
- Website: Home Page

Success and Failure Based on Reason and Reality is a 2018 self-improvement book authored by Ugandan businessman Hamis Kiggundu. It advises on financial success and the need to have a sense of purpose.

== Content ==
The 16-chapter book argues that many Ugandans are poor because they envy the rich and majority of them are saving but not investing because they fear risks. He highlights the fear of investing as a stumbling block to wealth. It also highlights the country's education system as another factor that has barred the majority of Ugandans, especially fresh graduates, from becoming rich. "The outdated education the country is offering our students is useless to the extent [that] it is inconsistent with the prevailing challenge With the outdated education, you cannot expect our children to become [the] bright future of the nation. It is like sending a soldier to war with [a] gun without bullets," he said at the launch of the book. Hamis also explains the sources of his money since he has been attacked by the public several times, with claims that powerful people in government have a hand in his success.

== Reception ==
After evaluation by the Uganda Ministry of Education and Sports through its National Curriculum Development Center, the book was found to be appropriate for the national curriculum. It is recommended for use at the Secondary School level and at institutions of higher learning. At its release, the author donated thousands of copies of the book to assorted schools and libraries in Uganda. The book was a national best seller. It won Book of the Year 2018 award in the category of Business Motivation by the Uganda Book Forum.

=== Uganda school curriculum ===
In June 2019 the book was reviewed and evaluated by the Uganda Ministry of Education and Sports through National Curriculum Development Center after they found it very relevant to be adopted in Uganda's curriculum and recommended it for use at Secondary School level and Higher Institutions of learning to inspire Ugandan students to begin investing.

== Translation ==
In May 2019, the author translated this book from English to Luganda. Luganda is a widely used native language in Uganda and throughout the Ugandan diaspora. Kiggundu believes distributing the book in a local language will bring his message to a larger audience. The Luganda version of his book is titled Obuwanguzi N'okulemererwa nga Nesigama ku Mazima N'okufumiitiriza.
