= Akright Projects Limited =

Ugandan property developer company

- Type: Private
- Industry: Real estate & construction
- Founded: 1999
- Headquarters: Kakungulu Housing Estate; Kampala-Entebbe Road; Bwebajja, Uganda
- Key people: Anatoli Kamugisha managing director & chief executive officer
- Products: Planned, organized residential housing estates
- Website: Homepage

Akright Projects Limited (APL) is a privately owned real estate development company in Uganda. APL is the largest indigenous property development company in Uganda.

== History ==
In 1990, Anatoli Kamugisha founded his first company Kanoblic Group Limited, a real estate construction business. He borrowed money from friends to register his business. He won construction contracts from several reputable firms, including Sugar Corporation of Uganda Limited and the Norwegian Forestry Society. In 1999, he closed down Kanoblic and started Akright Projects Limited, a company that plans, designs, and constructs organized residential communities (satellite cities) in or near urban centers in Uganda, as an alternative to the mushrooming slum problem in Uganda's cities and towns. The shares of stock of Akright are owned by Kamugisha and members of his family. The majority of senior managers in the company are also family members.

== Kakungulu Housing Estate ==
In 2002, Akright acquired 2 square miles (1,300 acres) of land from the descendants of Prince Badru Kakungulu for the development of the company's largest planned housing estate in the country to-date, Akright Kakungulu Housing Estate. It is located at Bwebajja, approximately 18 kilometres (11 mi), by road south-west of Kampala, Uganda's capital, along Kampala-Entebbe road.

== See also ==
- Association of Real Estate Agents Uganda
- Mortgage bank
- Wakiso District
- Anatoli Kamugisha
