= Ham Group =

Ugandan privately owned conglomerate

Ham Group of Companies
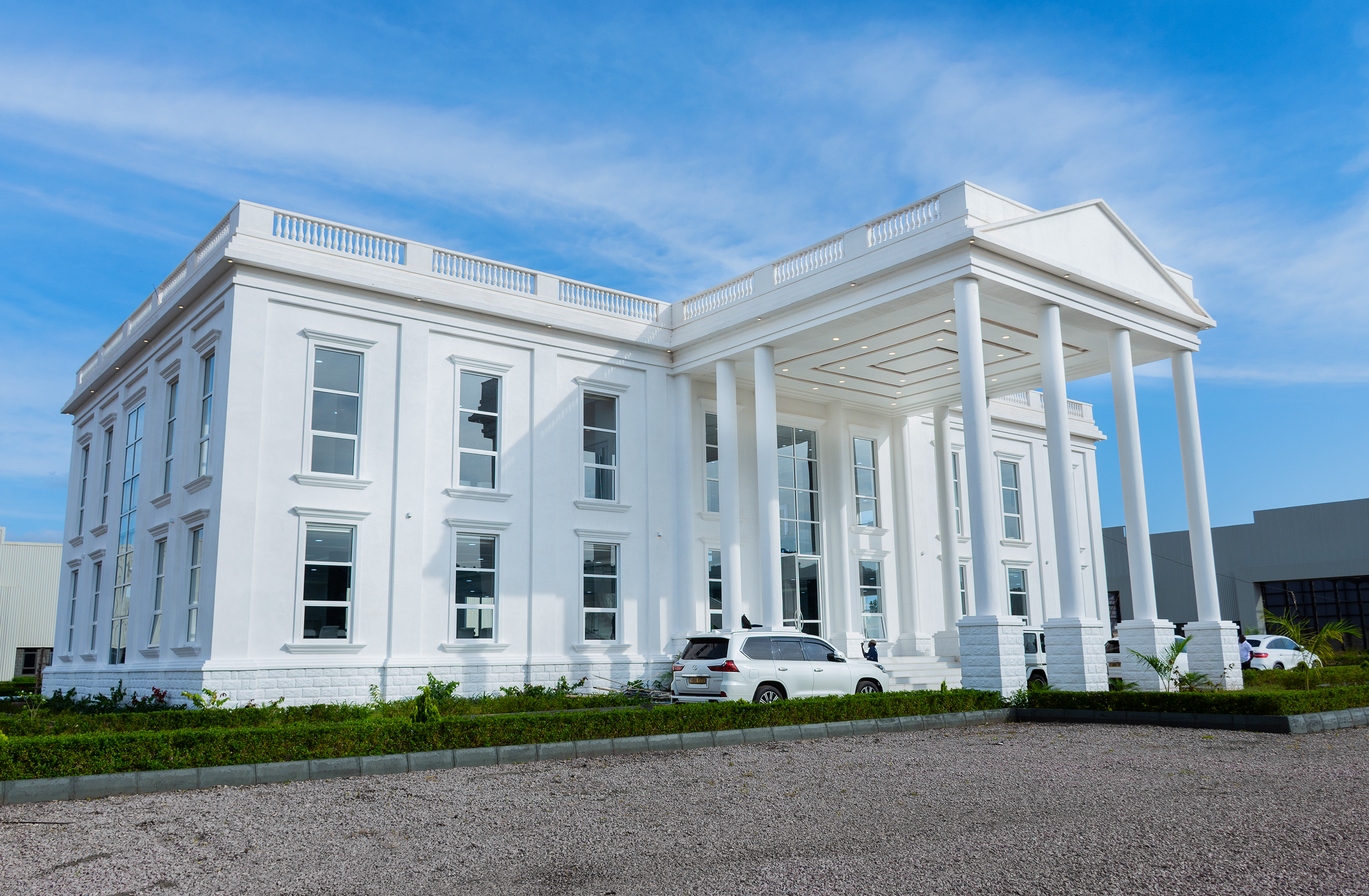
- Ham Group Headquarters in Uganda
- Type: Private Conglomerate
- Industry: Investments
- Founded: 2003; 23 years ago
- Headquarters: Kampala, Uganda
- Key people: Hamis Kiggundu; CEO
- Products: Real Estate, Agro-Processing, schools, Banking, hotels & resorts, Technology
- Number of employees: 7000
- Website: www.hamzgroup.com

The Ham Group of Companies is a Ugandan based privately owned multinational industrial conglomerate founded by Dr. Hamis Kiggundu. The White House is the Official headquarters of the Company. It is one of the largest conglomerates in East Africa employing more than 7,000 people.

== History ==
The Ham Group was founded in 2005 by Dr. Kiggundu, initially focusing on garment trading. Hamis learned business basics by helping his father, Hajji Segawa, in his textile shop and started his own business during school holidays with capital from his father. As his business grew, he moved into real estate, buying and selling land and properties. In 2009, he established Ham Enterprises (U) Ltd and began constructing commercial properties. His first major project was Ham Towers in Kampala, completed in 2010, followed by Ham Shopping Mall within 18 months, which boosted his rental income and enabled him to secure further bank financing.

By 2021, the Ham Group had diversified into large-scale industrialization, particularly in agro-processing. A pilot project was the US$156 million Integrated Agro-Processing Industrial Plant (IAIP) at Akright City, aimed at adding value to Uganda's agricultural products.

== Subsidiary companies ==
As of June 2024, the following companies are subsidiaries of Ham Group:

- Ham Enterprises Limited
- Ham Palm Villas, Entebbe–Kampala Expressway
- Ham International, Manchester
- Ham International Express Logistics, Texas, US
- Hamz Link, Kampala Uganda
- Ham Agro-Processing Industries
- Hana International School Limited, Nsangi
- Hamz International Real Estate LLC, Dubai
- Ham Agro Bank Limited Kampala
- Ham Cinemax-Kampala
- Kiggs International Uganda Ltd, Kampala
- Kiham Enterprises Ltd, Kampala

== See also ==
- List of conglomerates in Uganda
