= Godfrey Kirumira =

Ugandan businessman

- Born: October 9, 1962 (age 64); Uganda
- Occupation: Businessman
- Organization: Kwagalana Group

Godfrey Kirumira Kalule, (born 9 October 1962) is a Ugandan businessman. According to a 2012 published report, he is one of the wealthiest people in Uganda.

== Business interests ==
Kirumira's Baggery Trading Company Limited deals in fuel. It controls twelve petrol stations inside and outside Kampala under the brand name Gelp. He also has interests in real estate, general merchandise, import/export, and private security. Kirumira also owns is Nabugabo Updeal Venture Limited. His businesses are organized in the Godfrey Kirumira Kalule Group or GKK Group of Companies, of which Kirumira is the chairman.

== Other responsibilities ==
Kirumira is the chairman of Kwagalana Group, a club of the wealthiest tycoons in Uganda and founded in 2002.

== Net worth ==
According to New Vision, Kirumira had a net worth of about US$30 million in 2012.
