= Nakawa–Naguru Estates =

- Nickname: Nakawa–Naguru Satellite City
- Map of Uganda showing the location of Nakawa–Naguru Estates.
- Coordinates: 00°19′56″N 32°36′37″E
- Country: Uganda
- Region: Central Uganda
- District: Kampala District

Area
  - Total: 0.66 km^{2} (0.25 sq mi)
- Time zone: UTC+3 (EAT)

The Nakawa–Naguru Estates is a mixed, urban, commercial and residential real estate development, under construction in Uganda.

== Location ==
The development is located on 66 hectares (163 acres), of prime real estate in the Nakawa and Naguru neighborhoods in Kampala, the capital and largest city in the country. This is in Nakawa Division, one of the five administrative divisions of Kampala, about 5.5 kilometres (3 mi) north-east of the city center. The coordinates of the development are 0°19'56.0"N, 32°36'37.0"E (Latitude:0.332214; Longitude:32.610276).

== Overview ==
The development is a private-public partnership (PPP) project between the government of Uganda and OpecPrime Properties Uganda Limited (OPUL), a subsidiary of the Comer Group. The development is planned to include a club house, a swimming pool, a gymnasium, restaurants and retail shops. ROKO Construction was selected as the lead contractor. REMAX Uganda is the lead marketing firm for the project.

== History ==
The location of the present project was the location of the dilapidated Nakawa Housing Estate and Naguru Housing Estate, two low income residential housing neighborhoods built by the British in the 1950s to house domestic servants.

At Independence, in 1962, the two estates reverted to the central government and have been administered by the Kampala Capital City Authority (KCCA). Over the years the two housing estates became dilapidated and in 2001 were declared "unfit for human habitation". The government partnered with OpecPrime Properties Uganda, to develop the sites into a modern satellite city, with first consideration given to sitting tenants.

After many delays, including a lawsuit, construction finally began in February 2015. The project construction is planned to span ten years.

== See also ==
- Akright City
- Nakawa Division
