= StadiumDB.com =

Website about football stadiums

- Website type: Information site, stadium database
- Creator: Grzegorz Kaliciak
- Website: https://stadiumdb.com
- Launched: 2012
- Current status: Active

StadiumDB.com is a website about football stadiums, founded in 2012 on the basis of the Polish-language Stadiony.net website created in 2001. In September 2024, the Spanish-language website, EstadiosDB.com, was launched.

At the beginning of each year, the website organises the Stadium of the Year poll, a public vote to select the best football venue commissioned in the year preceding the competition. The award is the largest public vote of its kind in the world.

== History ==
The web portal was founded in 2012 on the basis of the Stadiony.net website edited in Polish. Stadiony.net was founded in August 2001 by Grzegorz Kaliciak. StadiumDB.com, EstadiosDB.com and Stadiony.net share an identical layout and have similar editorial content.

== Description ==
The main feature of the website is a news section about football facilities from all over the world. It regularly publishes content on ongoing or planned construction, important sporting and stadium-related events, as well as football fans’ issues like safe standing and groundhopping.

The website also has an international database (with descriptions and photos) of stadiums, including historic and tournament arenas, as well as the world's largest database of football stadium designs. In addition, there is also a section on stadiums under construction, where updates from football venues construction sites can be found.

The site is also active on Facebook, Twitter and Instagram, and has its own YouTube channel.

The themes of the website are strictly limited to football-specific stadiums or multi-purpose arenas where football matches can be organised. The service is created with the active participation of readers and others who share information, comments and photos.

== Stadium of the Year ==
At the beginning of each year, the website conducts the Stadium of the Year poll, the aim of which is to determine, through a public vote, the best football venue commissioned in the year preceding the competition, in the opinion of its readers.

The competition is an open, online vote in which readers of the website can participate by awarding points to five stadiums of their choice (scores of 5, 4, 3, 2 and 1). The award ranks among the most prestigious honours in sports architecture and is also the largest public vote of its kind in the world. In the record-breaking 2014 edition, nearly 100,000 votes were submitted.

In the 2014–2020 editions, in addition to the public poll, a Jury Vote was also organised separately. Architects specialising in stadium design were invited to join the panel of Juries.

The competition was first held in 2011 on the Polish language website Stadiony.net. Since the 3rd edition, following the creation of StadiumDB.com, the contest has been organised jointly in both language versions. Since the 2024 edition, the contest will also be organised on the newly launched EstadiosDB.com site, edited in Spanish.
