= Association of Real Estate Agents Uganda =

Ugandan real estate umbrella organization

- Abbreviation: AREA Uganda
- Formation: 2008
- Type: Real Estate Association
- Location: Kampala, Uganda
- Region served: Uganda
- Members: 270+ (2014)
- Official language: English
- President: Kongai Shirley
- Key people: Vincent Agaba; Founder; Victoria Nannozi; CEO; Julius Sebbale; Board Member; Luzarus Mugabi; Board Member; Sabiti Bagaine; Board Member; Lillian Kaddu; Board Member; Phiona Lwanga; Board Member
- Website: Homepage

The Association of Real Estate Agents Uganda (AREA Uganda), is an umbrella organization of real estate agents, managers, organizations and other real estate professionals in Uganda, the third-largest economy in the East African Community.

== Overview ==
It is Uganda's leading professional body for real estate agents. Its members practice across all aspects of property, both in Uganda and abroad. Activities that its members engage in, include residential and commercial sales and leasing, property management, business transfers and auctioneering. Headquartered in Kampala, Uganda's capital and largest city, AREA Uganda is governed by a Board of Directors. The Association continuously accepts new members.

== Funding and sponsorship ==
AREA Uganda receives financial and other support from civil society and corporate organizations, including the following:

- International Finance Corporation through Uganda's Primary Mortgage Market Initiative
- Private Sector Foundation Uganda
- United States Agency for International Development (USAID) through International Real Property Foundation
- DFCU Bank
- Stanbic Bank (Uganda) Limited
- Housing Finance Bank
- Akright Projects Limited
- Nationwide Properties Limited - A division of the Mukwano Group
- Kensington Africa Limited
- Uganda Ministry of Lands, Housing and Urban Development
- Property Services Limited

== Significant events ==
- 2008: AREA Uganda is founded
- 2009: The first real estate brokerage management and sales skills training course in Uganda is held in collaboration with the International Real Property Foundation.
- 2010: The Eastern Africa Real Estate Training Center is formulated in cooperation with the Institution of Surveyors of Kenya and the Real Estate Association of Rwanda. Sponsored by IRPF.
- 2010: The Makerere University Business School Real Estate Students Association (MURESA) is formed to help link students with the business community through Internships and job linkages.
- 2011: AREA-Uganda’s western and northern regional chapters are created with offices in Hoima and Gulu respectively.
- 2012: The first AREA-Uganda Women’s Committee Conference is held in association with the Women’s Council of REALTORS® and Counselors of Real Estate.
- 2013: The first stakeholders’ workshop on national real estate agents Code of Conduct is undertaken in collaboration with Uganda's Ministry of Lands, Housing & Urban Development, in collaboration with the IFC's Uganda Primary Mortgage Market Initiative (UPMMI).
- 2013: The first conference and expo on Unblocking Uganda’s Real Estate Potential is held. This attracts key players including Uganda Investment Authority (UIA), Women’s Council of REALTORS®, and IRPF.
- 2014: A project to establish a Multiple Listing Service (MLS) is initiated in collaboration with Uganda Primary Market Mortgage Initiative, under the International Finance Corporation (IFC).
- 2015: Launched the Real Estate Institute of East Africa (REIEA), a professional training arm for all agents in the region, the institute is affiliated to IHC Global USA.
- 2016: Played are key role in lobbying the Landlord Tenant Bill with the Ministry of Land, Housing and Urban Development (MLHUD), Private Sector Foundation Uganda (PSFU) and the Real Estate Management Bill through the World Bank and IMF.
- 2017: Launched the AREA investment Club and Shirley Kongai become the first woman President of the Association.

== Function ==
Objectives The main objectives of AREA Uganda are to:

- Lobby and advocate
- Promote real estate education
- Ensure business best practices
- Carryout research and development
- Encourage collaboration and networking

Trainings and courses AREA Uganda is engaged in several trainings which include; mortgage training, valuation training, brokerage management training and Instructors’ training at the East Africa Regional Real Estate Training Center in Nairobi.

The association offers the following courses:

- Real Estate brokerage and Management & Sales
- Property Management and Maintenance
- Real Estate Advanced Practices
- Certified International Property Specialist
- Real Estate Investment
- Housing Finance

Lobbying and advocacy The Association is the lobbying arm of the real estate sector in Uganda and does so, on behalf of its members. The body has lobbied on tax issues in Parliament, regulatory environment with the Ministry of Lands, Housing and Urban Development and does make presentations on housing forums representing the real estate industry.

Managing the Ugandan Women Access and Ownership of Land Project This project was designed to increase women's awareness and knowledge of land and property rights in the real estate sector so that they can act as leaders and advocates on such issues.

Support to students' Real Estate Associations AREA-Uganda in effort to promote the profession through academic institutions is committed to working with students through their associations like the Makerere University Business School Real Estate Students Association (MURESA) which works closely with AREA-Uganda to link students to the business community through Internships and job linkages.

== Membership ==
As of January 2014, the Association had nearly 300 members and more than 1,500 affiliations and connections nationally and Internationally.

=== Categories ===
AREA Uganda consists of four Membership Categories, that is: (a) Corporate Membership for all real estate agencies and management companies; (b) Individual Membership for all persons practicing or interested in real estate at an individual level; (c) Associate Membership for real estate developers, mortgage practitioners, architects, appraisers, academic institutions plus all other related professions and (d) Student Membership for persons pursuing real estate education.

=== Representation ===
The association is represented at the board of Private Sector Foundation Uganda, where the AREAU chief executive officer sits on the audit committee. The association is also represented on some of the committees at the Uganda Ministry of Lands, Housing and Urban Planning where the association’s President and Publicity Secretary are representatives.

The association is also represented at the Property Price Index Survey, conducted by Uganda Bureau of Statistics and the Bank of Uganda.

== See also ==
- Economy of Uganda
- Mortgage bank
