= Joseph Magandaazi Yiga =

Ugandan businessman

- Born: Magandaazi; 1957 (age 68–69); Uganda
- Occupations: Entrepreneur and business executive
- Years active: 1997 – present
- Title: Managing director & CEO; Jomayi Property Consultants

Joseph Magandaazi Yiga (born 1957) is a Ugandan businessman and entrepreneur. He is the managing director and chief executive officer of Jomayi Property Consultants Limited, a leading real estate and development company based in Kampala, Uganda's capital and largest city. Yiga is reported to be one of the wealthiest individuals in Uganda, with net assets of approximately US$10 million as of January 2012.

== Background ==
He was born in the Central Region of Uganda, sometime in the mid to late 1950s.

== Career ==
After several odd jobs, including as a telephone booth operator, Yiga founded Jomayi in 1997, naming the company from the first two letters of each of his three names. Jomayi Property Consultants Limited maintains its headquarters in a building that the company wholly owns, at 20 Old Kampala Road, on Kampala Hill, in Uganda's capital, Kampala.

As of December 2013, Jomayi has developed nearly 100 residential housing estates, where it buys acreage in bulk, brings utilities (electricity, water and sewerage) to the location, subdivides the land into plots, and sells those to interested end-users. As the property development function has prospered, Jomayi has formed other businesses to complement its business; in the process, forming the Jomayi Group of Companies. Companies in the Group include the following:

1. Jomayi Construction Company – Founded in 2007 to construct houses for clients who were finding it hard to engage honest, reputable builders.
2. Jomayi Stones & Concrete Limited – Founded in 2008, it owns a stone quarry on 300 acres (0.47 mi^{2}), in Mukono District.
3. Jomayi Water Company Limited – A water supply company in Mukono District.
4. Jomayi Hardware Centre Limited – Founded in 2011.
5. Jomayi Paints Limited – Supplier of locally made and imported house paints. Founded in 2012.
6. St. Josephat Secondary School – Located at Kabaga, Kitagobwa in Mpererwe.

== See also ==
- AREAU
- African Millionaires
