= Stadium of the Year =

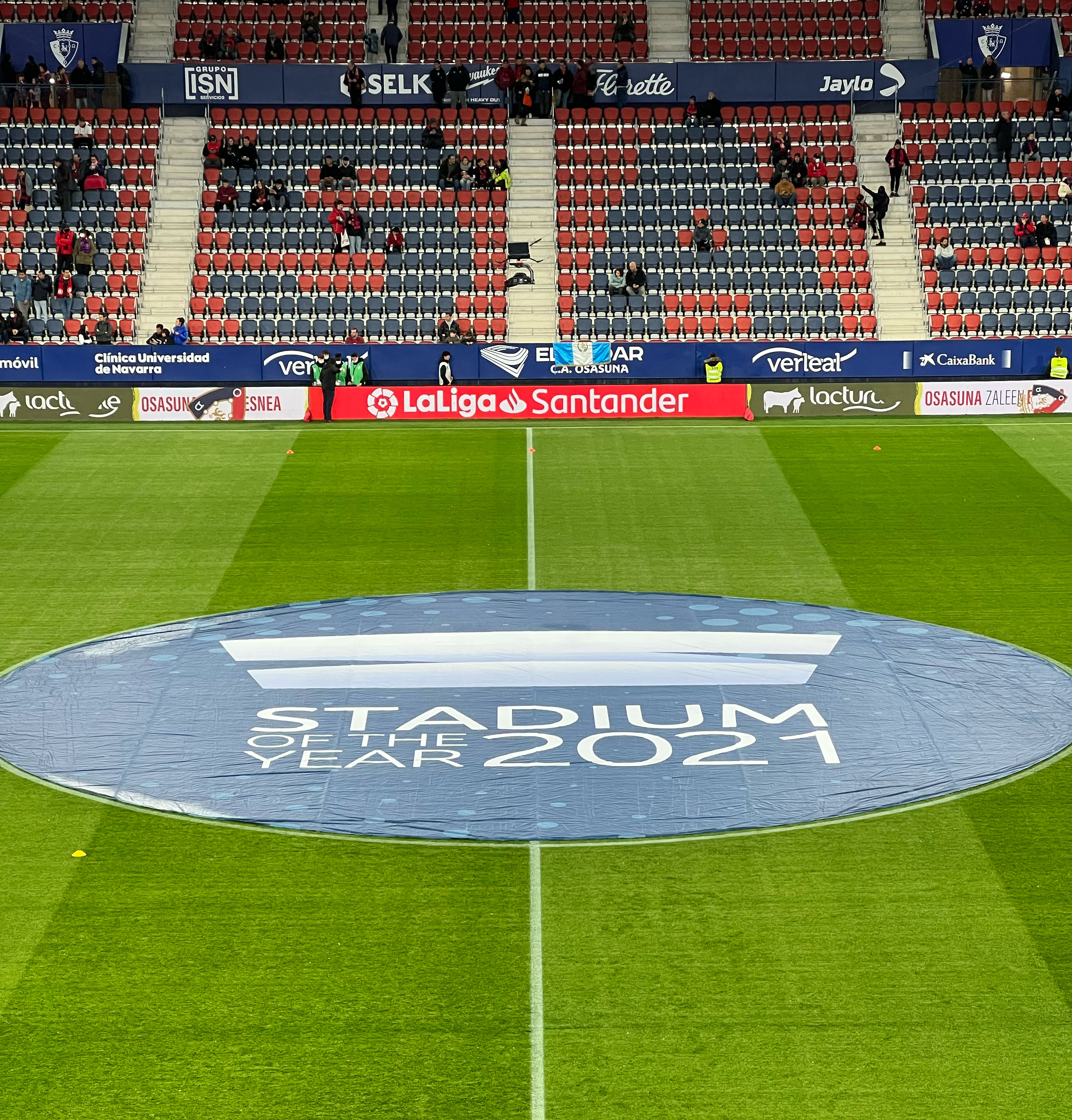
- Awarded for: best football stadium completed in the year preceding the contest
- Presented by: StadiumDB.com
- First award: 2011

Stadium of the Year is an annual public poll organised by StadiumDB.com website, to select, through a public vote, the best football stadium completed in the year preceding the contest. The award is the largest public vote of its kind in the world.

The contest is organised by StadiumDB.com and its twin site Stadiony.net, edited in Polish. In the 2014–2020 editions, jury voting was held separately, in addition to public polls. Since the 2024 edition, the contest will also be organised on the newly launched EstadiosDB.com site, edited in Spanish.

== Description ==
In 2011 Stadiony.net web portal for the first time organised a competition in which readers could vote for the best football arena in their opinion, commissioned in 2010. The contest has been held annually since then.

Initially, the competition was organised only in the Polish language version of the website. Since the 3rd edition, following the creation of the English version of the site, StadiumDB.com, the contest has been held jointly in both language versions. Since the 15th edition (Stadium of the Year 2024), the competition will also be organized in the launched in 2024 Spanish version of the website, EstadiosDB.com.

The voting each year is preceded by a nomination phase, during which readers can submit their suggestions and comments, influencing the final list of stadiums considered for the competition. Facilities that meet the following criteria are eligible to participate in the poll:

- were commissioned in the year prior to the vote
- are completely new or substantially redeveloped
- are suitable for hosting football matches
- have a capacity of at least 10,000 spectators

The competition takes the form of an open, online vote in which readers of the website can take part, awarding points to five stadiums of their choice (scores of 5, 4, 3, 2 and 1). The award is the largest public vote of its kind in the world. In the record-breaking 2014 edition, nearly 100,000 votes were cast.

In the 2014–2020 editions, in addition to the public vote, a jury vote was also organised separately. Architects specialising in stadium design, were invited to join the panel of jurors.

The statue for winning the 2021 edition (in which El Sadar Stadium in Pamplona was selected as the best) was presented by the owner of the site to the president of the CA Osasuna club, Luis Sabalza. The brief ceremony took place on April 20, 2022 at the winning stadium, just before Osasuna's high-profile encounter with Real Madrid, and was broadcast live on the official La Liga coverage worldwide.

== List of winners ==
List of past winners of the Stadium of the Year contest:

| Edition | Year | Nominations | Votes | Public Award | Jury Vote |
|---|---|---|---|---|---|
| 1 ( (Poland) Stadiony.net only) | 2010 | 22 | 1809 | (Republic of Ireland) Aviva Stadium (Dublin) | – |
| 2 ( (Poland) Stadiony.net only) | 2011 | 27 | 11 859 | (Poland) Stadion Gdańsk (Gdańsk) | – |
| 3 | 2012 | 16 | 14 439 | (Brazil) Arena do Grêmio (Porto Alegre) | – |
| 4 | 2013 | 18 | 27 851 | (Belgium) Ghelamco Arena (Ghent) | – |
| 5 | 2014 | 32 | 96 772 | (Brazil) Allianz Parque (São Paulo) | (United Arab Emirates) Hazza bin Zayed Stadium (Al Ain) |
| 6 | 2015 | 22 | 37 677 | (Mexico) Estadio BBVA (Guadalupe) | (France) Nouveau Stade de Bordeaux (Bordeaux) |
| 7 | 2016 | 29 | 82 826 | (Turkey) Vodafone Park (Istanbul) | (United Kingdom) London Stadium (London) |
| 8 | 2017 | 27 | 53 083 | (Paraguay) Estadio General Pablo Rojas (Asunción) | (Russia) Luzhniki Stadium (Moscow) |
| 9 | 2018 | 27 | 35 330 | (Russia) Volgograd Arena (Volgograd) | (Hungary) Diósgyőri Stadion (Miskolc) |
| 10 | 2019 | 21 | 30 632 | (Hungary) Puskás Aréna (Budapest) | Japan National Stadium (Tokyo) |
| 11 | 2020 | 20 | 21 821 | (Malaysia) Sultan Ibrahim Stadium (Iskandar Puteri) | (United States) SoFi Stadium (Inglewood) |
| 12 | 2021 | 23 | 12 873 | (Spain) El Sadar Stadium (Pamplona) | – |
| 13 | 2022 | 36 | 24 524 | (Greece) OPAP Arena (Athens) | – |
| 14 | 2023 | 35 | 12 073 | (Brazil) Arena MRV (Belo Horizonte) | – |
| 15 | 2024 | 23 | 9 750 | (Germany) Ernst-Abbe-Sportfeld (Jena) | – |
| 16 | 2025 | 28 | 7 451 | (Morocco) Prince Moulay Abdellah Stadium (Rabat) | – |
