= Norwegian Forestry Society =

Organization

Logo.

The Norwegian Forestry Society (Norwegian: Det norske Skogselskap, often shortened to Skogselskapet) is an interest organisation in Norway.

It was established as Det norske Skogselskab in 1898, with Axel Heiberg as its first chairman. Its purpose is to promote forestry interests. It issues the magazine Norsk Skogbruk. Chairman of the board is Johan C. Løken, and the organizational headquarters are in Oslo.
