= Akright City =

Community in Wakiso District of the Central Region of Uganda

- Nickname: Akright Kakungulu Housing Estate
- Map of Uganda showing the location of Akright City.
- Coordinates: 00°10′21″N 32°31′06″E
- Country: Uganda
- Region: Central
- District: Wakiso District

Area
  - Total: 5.2 km^{2} (2.0 sq mi)
- Elevation: 1,300 m (4,300 ft)
- Time zone: UTC+3 (EAT)

Akright City is a residential community in Wakiso District of the Central Region of Uganda.

== Location ==
Akright City is bordered by Namugongo Road to the north, the community of Bwebajja and Kampala–Entebbe Road to the east, Namulanda to the southeast, Palm Valley Golf and Country Club to the south, and the community of Sekiwunga and Entebbe–Kampala Expressway to the west. The coordinates of the neighborhood are:0°10'21.0"N, 32°31'06.0"E (Latitude:0.172504; Longitude:32.518333).

The neighborhood is located about 21 kilometres (13 mi), northeast of the town of Entebbe, the nearest large town. This is approximately 20 kilometres (12 mi), southwest of Kampala, the capital and largest city in the country.

== Overview ==
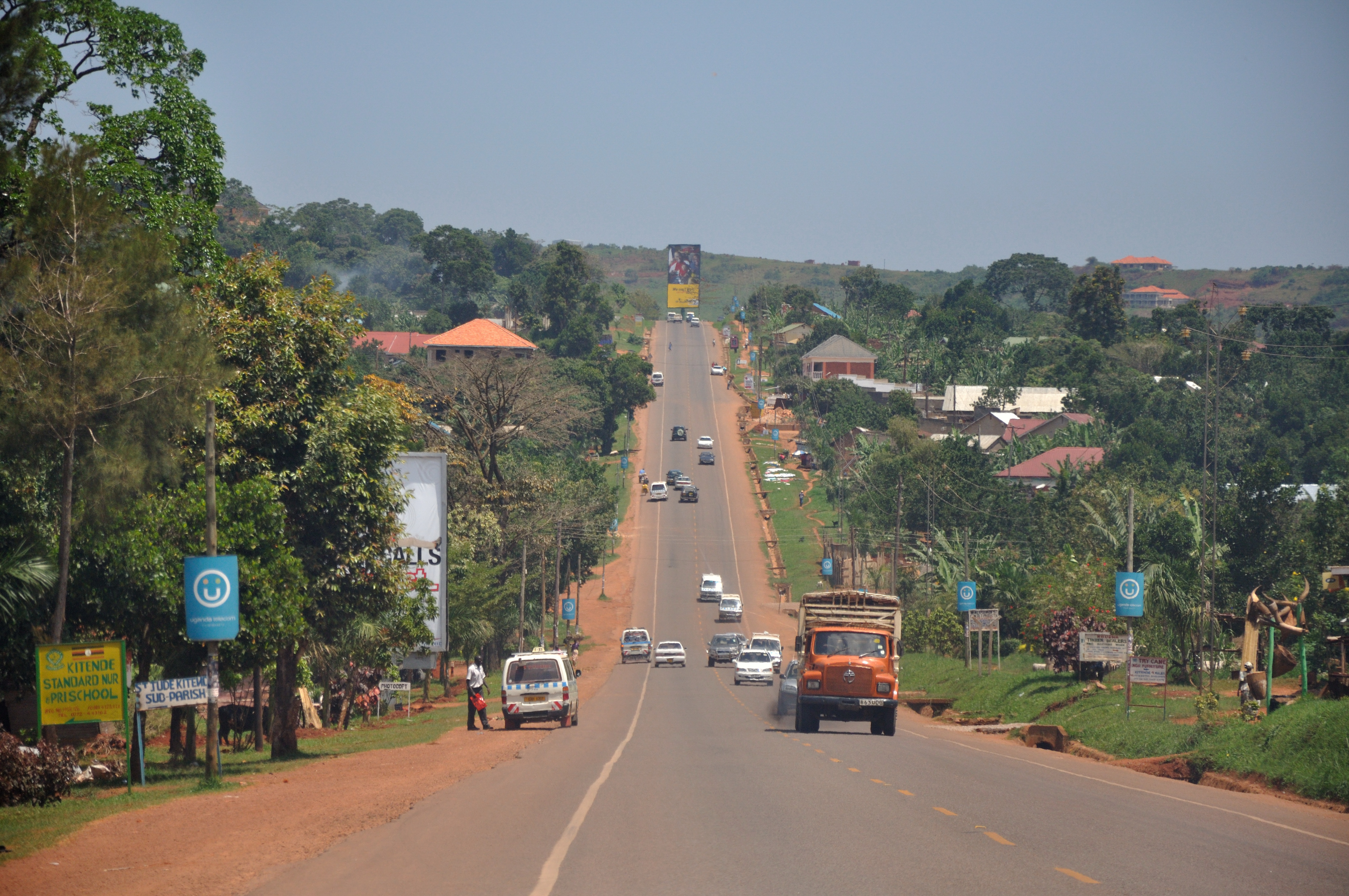
Road to Akright City

In 2002, Anatoli Kamugisha, the proprietor of Akright Projects Limited, acquired 2 square miles (1,300 acres), formerly belonging to the family of the late Badru Kakunglu. Akright then designed a self-sustaining community of twelve smaller neighborhoods, grouped based on the price of the housing in each neighborhood. The development includes schools, shopping malls, a hospital, supermarkets, a golf club and a golf course. The estate is continually being expanded, with final development planned or 2022.

== See also ==
- List of roads in Uganda
- Nakawa–Naguru Estates

== Diagrams ==
- Partial rendering of Akright City
