= Hamis Kiggundu =

Ugandan businessman and author

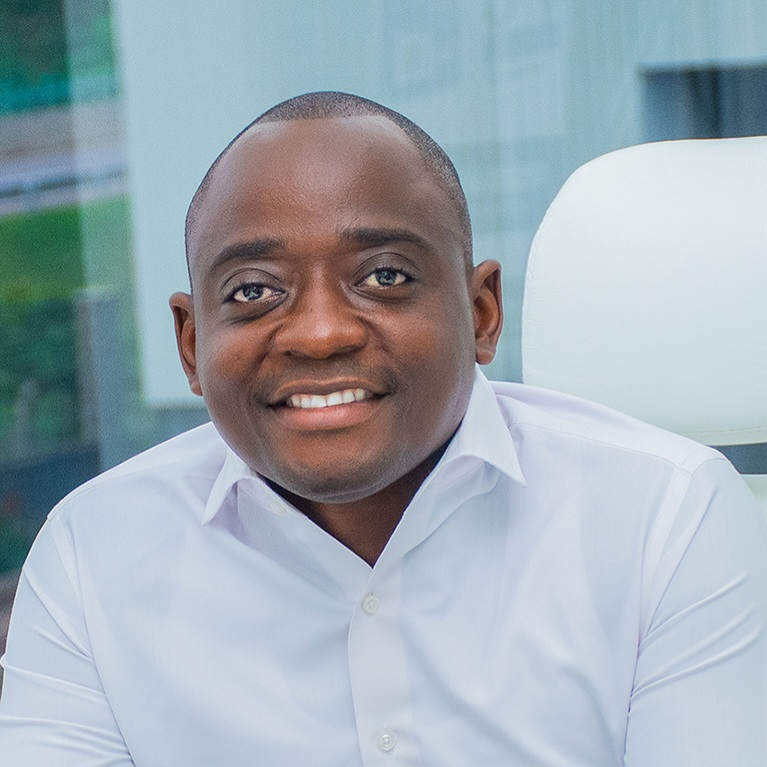
- Born: February 10, 1984 (age 42); Masaka, Uganda
- Education: Kabojja International School, Munyonyo
- Alma mater: School of Law, Makerere University, Kampala (Bachelor of Laws)
- Occupations: Businessman, entrepreneur, investor, lawyer
- Years active: 2003–present
- Notable work: Hamz Stadium
- Awards: Business Motivation Book of the Year 2018, Uganda
- Website: Home Page

Hamis Kiggundu (born 10 February 1984), commonly known as Ham, is a Ugandan businessman, lawyer, and author. He is the CEO of the Ham Group of Companies and has written two books: Success and Failure Based on Reason and Reality (2018) and Reason as the World Masterpiece (2021).

According to The Independent 2026 wealth ranking, Kiggundu was listed as Uganda's richest individual, with an estimated net worth of approximately US$1.35 billion.

In March 2020, Kiggundu was featured prominently in Ugandan media for his court battle against Diamond Trust Bank. He alleged that the bank defrauded him over $30 million over the course of 10 years. He won the case in October 2020 and the Ugandan High Court ordered Diamond Trust Bank to refund all the unlawfully withdrawn monies totalling to USh 34.29 billion and US$23.4 million, with an additional 8% interest for legal costs. The court additionally ordered the bank to unconditionally release/discharge all mortgages allegedly created over all Kiggundu's properties and all corporate and personal guarantees issued by Kiggundu. The court also issued a permanent injunction to prevent DTB from enforcing the mortgages over Kiggundu's properties. DTB Bank later appealed the decision in the High Court and were issued an injunction halting payment of the monies. In November 2023, this legal dispute was peacefully settled outside court. Ham and Nasim Devji, the group CEO of Diamond Trust Bank Group reached a mutual agreement in a private meeting to drop all court cases.

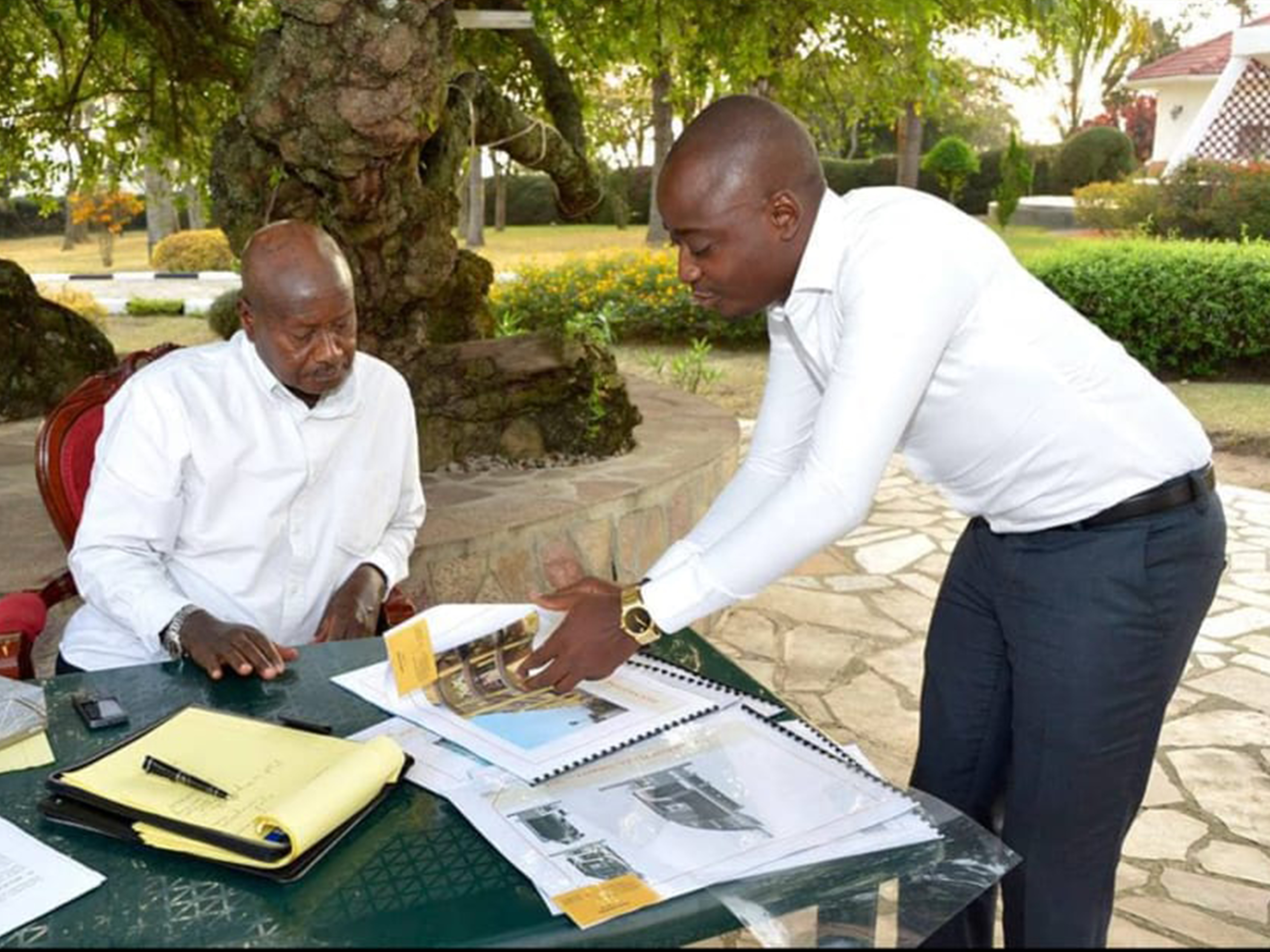
Kiggundu present Nakivubo Stadium Re-development Proposal to President Museveni in 2015

Kiggundu received a presidential directive in 2015 to redevelop and upgrade Nakivubo Stadium under a public-private partnership with the Ugandan government. Construction works began in 2017 following the demolition of the old structures. The project expanded the stadium's seating capacity from 30,000 to 35,000 and introduced modern facilities including floodlights, seating, digital screens, and parking. The new upgraded stadium was officially commissioned by President Museveni in April 2024.

== Early life ==
Kiggundu was born on 10 February 1984 in the Masaka District of Central Uganda region. He is a son of Haruna Segawa (father) and Nakayiza Jalia (mother) who are part of a family with extensive property investments in Kampala.

Kiggundu attended his elementary education in Masaka, joined Kabojja International School in Kampala District for his high school education, and later graduated from Makerere University with a Bachelors of Laws.

Kiggundu was born and raised in a Muslim family. He talks about Islam as "the highest achievement of a lifetime."

== Business career ==
Kiggundu started his business journey in 2005 as a garments trader. He used to support his father Hajji Segawa in his textile shop from where he learnt basic business principles and during middle school holidays his father gave him capital to start his own venture. As his business grew, he started buying and selling land and properties and in 2009, he incorporated Ham Enterprises (U) Ltd and advanced to constructing and owning commercial properties. In 2010, Kiggundu started constructing Ham Towers, his first commercial property at the Makerere suburb of Kampala city. According to billionaires.africa, having mastered the commercial real estate trifles with reference to lessons learnt from his first project, Kiggundu was able to move a bit faster and within 18 months, he built his second commercial property, Ham Shopping Mall. With combined rental income coming from both properties, he was able to easily secure more financing with the banks, for other projects given his reasonable collateral.

By 2021, Kiggundu had diversified his investments into multiple sectors, including real estate, finance, banking, IT, and social media platforms and large-scale industrialization, with the various ventures administered and managed through the Ham Group of Companies.According to the Forbes report on Uganda by Penresa, he embarked on a US$156 million project in the central region where a pilot advanced Integrated Agro-Processing Industrial Plant (IAIP) was set up at Akright City to process and add value to Uganda's agro produce.

== Nakivubo Channel redevelopment ==
From 2024, Kiggundu became a central figure in debates over the redevelopment of Nakivubo Channel, Kampala's main stormwater conduit. The channel, which drains much of the central city, had long suffered from siltation, waste dumping and encroachment, contributing to recurrent flooding in adjacent commercial areas. After the redevelopment of Nakivubo War Memorial Stadium by Kiggundu's companies, inspections by the Confederation of African Football and other football bodies highlighted the poor state of the surrounding open drainage and recommended improvements as part of Uganda's preparations for hosting the 2027 Africa Cup of Nations.

In response, Kiggundu's firms undertook desilting and unclogging works around the stadium and later submitted a proposal to Kampala Capital City Authority (KCCA) to cover and upgrade sections of Nakivubo Channel and construct commercial structures above a reinforced slab. The initiative prompted disputes between KCCA's political leadership and the developer over approvals and procedure, while technical assessments by KCCA engineers reported that earlier clearance works had improved water flow. In April 2025, KCCA Council adopted a resolution supporting the involvement of private investors in upgrading key open drainages under Authority supervision, and in September 2025 KCCA formally approved Kiggundu's redevelopment application subject to planning and technical conditions.

The project subsequently received a presidential directive endorsing the concept of a privately funded upgrade and an Environmental and Social Impact Assessment approval from the National Environment Management Authority with mitigation requirements. It has attracted both support and criticism from politicians, planners, environmental groups and traders, with proponents citing potential reductions in flooding and improved urban conditions, and critics raising concerns about governance, ecological impacts and the long-term management of public drainage infrastructure. As of late 2025, the works on Nakivubo Channel remained ongoing.

=== Replica of the White House in Uganda ===
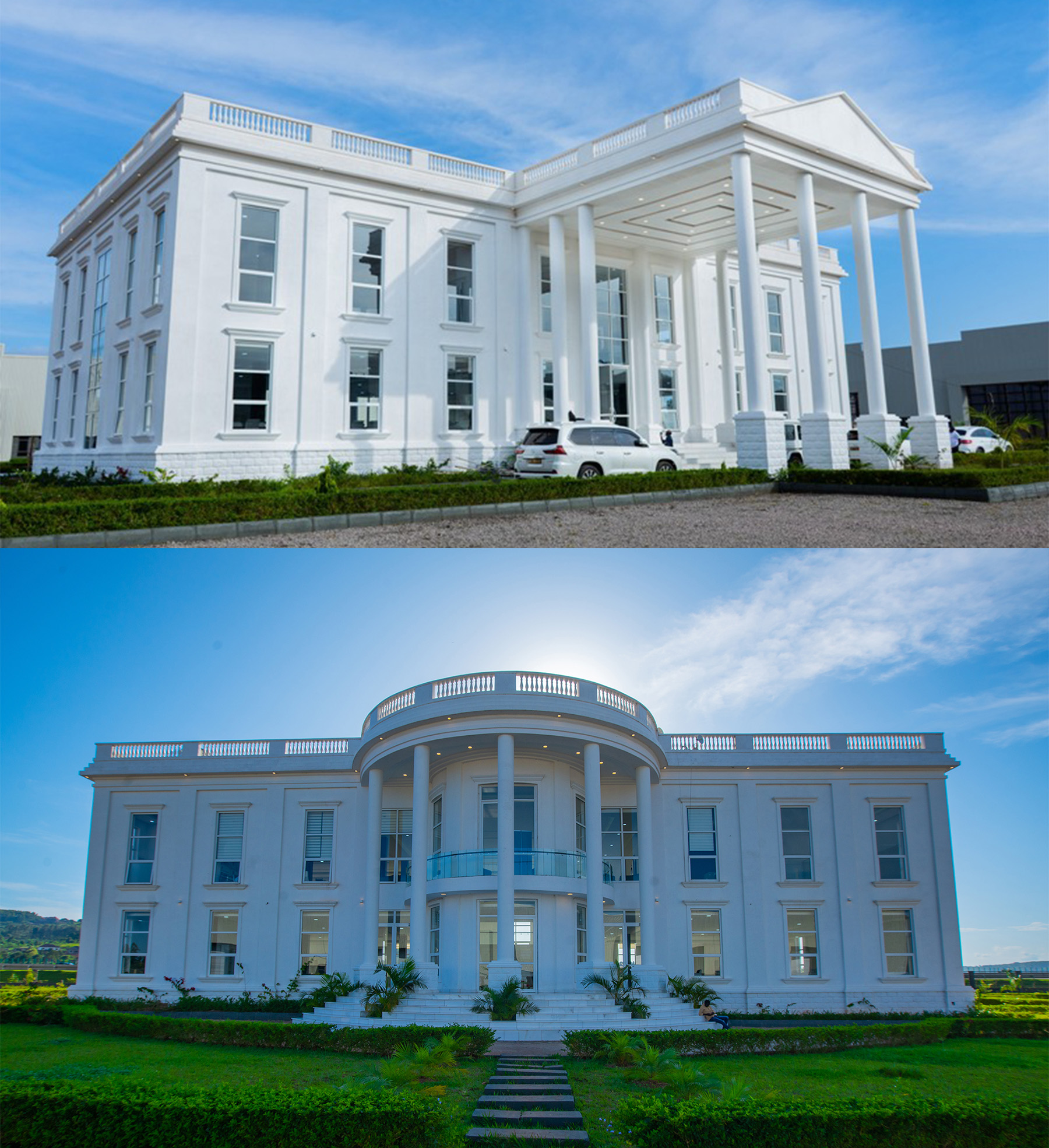
Kiggundu's Ugandan Replica of the White house

Kiggundu built a replica of the White House in Akright City, Entebbe, which serves as the headquarters for his Ham Integrated Agro Processing Industries. He stated in a 2023 interview with Wode Maya that the project aimed to encourage local ambition and highlight opportunities within Africa.

=== Ham Palm Villas ===
Kiggundu initiated a large-scale residential estate on the outskirts of Kampala in 2019. The project was designed as a modern housing environment within Uganda's rapidly urbanizing landscape. This development comprises several residential units, including 500 detached homes, villas and 625 apartments, laid out to accommodate middle- and upper-income residents. Located in Akright City within Kajjansi Town Council, the estate benefits from proximity to major transport corridors, including the Entebbe Expressway, providing access between Kampala and Entebbe International Airport.

Kiggundu has stated that the project was influenced by the increasing number of Ugandans emigrating in search of improved living standards abroad, with the estate intended to demonstrate how high-quality housing can be developed locally. The initiative has also been presented as part of a broader approach to raising residential standards, supporting infrastructure expansion, and encouraging sustainable urban growth around the capital.

=== Hamz ===
In 2021, Kiggundu launched the Hamz brand, which encompasses ventures in fashion, sports, digital innovation, and community engagement in Uganda. Its fashion line includes retail outlets offering items such as T-shirts, caps, and stationery. In the sports sector, the brand oversees Hamz Sports Club, which focuses on youth participation in sport, education, and health, and incorporates Hamz Stadium, formerly Nakivubo Stadium before its renovation, as well as facilities in Kigo, Wakiso District. The brand also operates a digital innovation venture providing services in e-commerce and online payments through platforms including Hamz App and Hamz Pay, among others trading through Hamz Limited.

== Philanthropy ==
In 2017, Kiggundu, through the Kampala General Better Traders Association, donated UGX 100 million to support vendors displaced following the demolition of Nakivubo Park Yard market. The funds were intended to assist affected traders in restarting their businesses. He also provided a six-month rent-free period for vendors who relocated to Ham Shopping Ground.

In April 2020, Kiggundu donated food relief during the COVID-19 pandemic through Uganda's national task force. He also contributed food supplies distributed to journalists through the Uganda Journalists Association. Some media reports also noted criticism regarding cash distributions to journalists.

In July 2021, he donated UGX 530 million to the Government of Uganda to support COVID-19 vaccine procurement.

In January 2024, Kiggundu donated 100,000 royal palm trees to the Kampala Capital City Authority as part of the city greening programme. Staff from his organisation assisted with tree planting activities in Kampala.

== Awards and recognition ==
In 2018, Kiggundu was given an award as an acknowledgement for his book, Success and Failure Based on Reason and Reality. It was nominated the best book of the year in the category of Business Motivation at an event held by the Book Forum of Uganda in Kampala.

In 2023, Kiggundu was awarded the African Renaissance & Iconic Development Entrepreneur Award by the Pan-African Pyramid Global Awards for his significant contributions to Africa's economic development and his influential entrepreneurial efforts in Africa.

In February 2024, Kiggundu received the Special Presidential Recognition Award from the Minister for Kampala Capital City Authority and Metropolitan Affairs. This award, presented by the Office of the President, honored his dedicated service and significant contributions to the social and economic development of Kampala, particularly benefiting disadvantaged communities.

In June 2024, Kiggundu received a Professional Doctorate in Global Leadership and Management from the European International University. This recognition honored his dedication, hard work, and significant contributions to social, economic, and corporate sectors, as well as his efforts in expanding his organization internationally.

== Personal life ==
Kiggundu resides in Kampala, Uganda, in a residence constructed in 2014 and reported to cover approximately 479,160 square feet. The property, sometimes referred to as "Ham's Residence," has been profiled in various media features and interviews. Kiggundu has expressed a preference for a consistent; shades of grey, black, and white design, which is reflected in both his personal wardrobe, the architectural style of his residence and commercial buildings.

In April 2024, Kiggundu publicly shared photographs of his family on social media, including images with his wives and their children, accompanied by a caption expressing gratitude to Allah for what he described as a blessing. The post drew significant attention online, with responses ranging from expressions of congratulation to broader commentary on his personal life.

Kiggundu has also positioned himself as an advocate for African prosperity, frequently emphasizing the importance of reason, cultural values, and mindset in achieving development. In his public statements and writings, he has argued that Africa's progress depends on rethinking education systems, reducing dependence on foreign consumption, and fostering locally driven innovation and value addition.

== Impersonation scams ==
In the 2020s, Ugandan authorities reported several cases of individuals impersonating Kiggundu on social media platforms. The fraudulent accounts used his name, photographs and publicly available content to falsely claim affiliation with his businesses while soliciting money from members of the public for purported loans, investment opportunities or employment programs.

Several suspects were arrested and arraigned before Buganda Road Court on charges related to impersonation and obtaining money by false pretenses.

Media reports indicated that the suspects allegedly used social media messaging and promotional posts to request payments from victims while claiming connections to Kiggundu.

According to media reports, the incidents prompted warnings from Ham Group of Companies cautioning the public about fraudulent social media accounts using Kiggundu's identity.

== See also ==
- Ham Group
- List of conglomerates in Uganda
- Sudhir Ruparelia
