= Caminos del Inca Shopping Centre =

Shopping centre in Lima, Peru

Centro Comercial Caminos del Inca
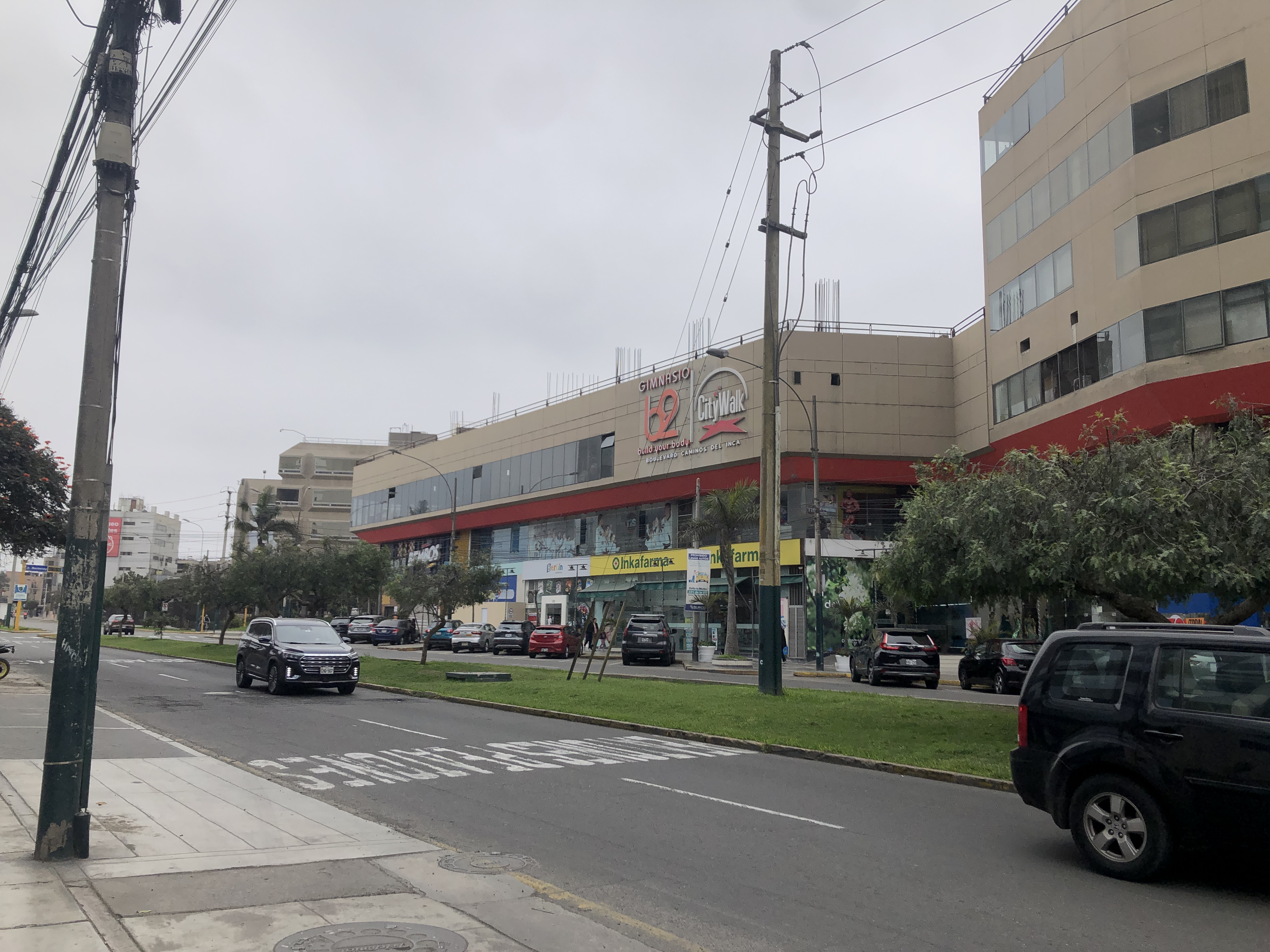
- Location: Chacarilla del Estanque
- Address: Avenida Caminos del Inca & Jirón Monterrey
- Opened: 1988
- Renovated: 2001
- Previous names: Fashion Mall Caminos del Inca (1988–?)
- Num. of stores: ≈200
- Floors: 4
- Public transit: Angamos (Lima and Callao Metro)
- Website: Official website

Centro Comercial Caminos del Inca, formerly known as Fashion Mall Caminos del Inca, is a shopping centre located between Caminos del Inca Avenue and Monterrey Street in Chacarilla del Estanque, Lima, Peru. Named after the adjacent avenue, it is the first such establishment of Santiago de Surco.

== History ==
Following the urbanisation of the Chacarilla del Estanque hacienda in the 1970s, the Izaga family, who had sold the terrain, built a shopping centre to promote new housing projects. It opened in 1988, originally known as Fashion Mall Caminos del Inca. The new establishment replaced a convent originally destined to become a hospital, and was expanded in 2001.

In 2011, a grey Peugeot fell from the fourth floor's car park, falling into the mall's interior, with only the driver injured.

On March 18, 2019, the mall's movie theatre, UVK Multicines, shut down its operations after almost 20 years, being replaced by rival chain Cineplanet, who eventually closed without explanation in February 2025.

On April 22, 2025, the mall was temporarily closed due to mechanical failures regarding its elevators and escalators.

== Retail tenants ==
Notable tenants include:

- Adidas Kids
- Banco Bilbao Vizcaya Argentaria
- Bancom
- Banco de Crédito del Perú
- Banco de la Nación
- Bembos
- Cineplanet
- Crisol
- GlobalNet
- Hush Puppies
- Ibero Librerías
- Inkafarma
- Jacinta Fernández
- Kayser
- Kids Made Here
- Latam Perú
- Plaza Vea
- Scotiabank
- Starbucks
- Tai Loy
- Tommy Hilfiger

The mall also once featured a number of stores, including: TACA Airlines, Pizza Nova, Soho Style, Do It, Dunkelvolk, Green Is Better, Koketa, Phantom, Renzo Costa, McDonald's, Rip Curl, UVK Multicines, among others.

== See also ==
- Chacarilla del Estanque
- Jockey Plaza, located in the same district
