= Nexus Group =

Private equity fund in Peru

Nexus Group (NG) is a leading private equity fund in Peru. It was founded in 1998 by Carlos Rodríguez-Pastor, Jose Antonio Rosas, Rafael Dasso and Alejandro Ponce. It is currently one of the biggest private equity funds in Peru, with secured capital contributions of over US$1 billion from a diverse pool of foreign and local investors, including institutional investors and family offices. Nexus’ funds invest primarily in buyout and growth capital transactions, with a clear goal to contribute on the development of enterprises in Peru and the region.

Nexus currently manages two funds: NGCP I, which closed commitments on 2011, and NGCP II, on 2013. Both funds focus on investing in companies that tailor their products and services to the emerging middle class while generating high returns through operational excellence. The group has made over 23 acquisitions throughout the years, and currently manages 13 companies, all headquartered in Peru.

== History ==
In the following years to the foundation, NG aimed mainly to secure "club deals", which are investment opportunities where several parties are involved in the acquisition of the asset. The standout acquisitions made throughout these years were; Cineplanet[es] in 1999, a leading movie theatre chain in Peru; Casa Andina[es] in 2003, the largest Peruvian hotel chain, and; Peruplast in 2007, a flexible packaging company with operations in the entire Andean region.

=== NGCP I ===
In 2011, Nexus Group secured commitments of US$321 million for their first institutional fund: Nexus Group Capital Partners I, L.P. With these commitments, Nexus acquired Oeschle[es] in 2008, Innova Schools in 2010, Inkafarma in 2011, Promart in 2011, proprietary university Universidad Tecnológica del Perú/Grupo UTP in 2012, credit card service Financiera Uno (now Financiera Oh!) in 2013, and NGR (NG Restaurants, which include Don Belisario, Dunkin Donuts, Papa Johns, China Wok, Bembos and Popeyes) from 2011 to 2014. In 2011, NGCP I traded their share on Inkafarma for a share on InRetail Peru, thus becoming shareholder of the company that owns, Supermercados Peruanos (operating under Plaza Vea and Vivanda names), Inkafarma and the largest mall operator in the country, Real Plaza[es].

=== NGCP II ===
In 2013, Nexus Group secured commitments of US$600 million for their second institutional fund, Nexus Group Capital Partners II, L.P., after the quick success of the first one. With the commitments secured, the fund made substantial contributions and capital injections to previous fund corporations such as Financiera Uno and Grupo UTP, and acquired San Miguel Industrias PET in 2013, a preform and bottle manufacturer with regional presence, Zegel IPAE in 2014, Intralot de Peru in 2016, and Quicorp and Sinea in 2018. The Quicorp acquisition later became a merge with Inkafarma under a singular entity named InRetail Pharma. Nexus Group also invested in several schools and universities.
