= Carlos Rodríguez-Pastor =

Peruvian businessman (born 1959)

- Born: Carlos Tomás Rodríguez-Pastor Persivale; 11 April 1959 (age 67); Lima, Peru
- Education: University of California, Berkeley; Dartmouth College
- Occupation: Businessman
- Known for: Owner of 71% of Intergroup Financial
- Title: Chairman and CEO of Intercorp; Managing general partner of Nexus Group; Chairman of Interbank
- Board member of: Supermercados Peruanos
- Spouse: Gabriela Perez Rocchietti
- Children: 2
- Parent(s): Carlos Rodríguez-Pastor Sr. Haydee Rodríguez-Pastor

Carlos Tomás Rodríguez-Pastor Persivale (born 11 April 1959) is a Peruvian billionaire businessman, and the owner of 71% of Intergroup Financial Services, a Peruvian banking and retail group. He is chairman and CEO of Intercorp, managing general partner of Nexus Group, and chairman of Interbank. He is one of the wealthiest individuals in Peru; As of 2023 Forbes estimates his net worth to be US$1.5 billion.

== Early life ==
Carlos Rodríguez-Pastor was born in Peru on 11 April 1959. In 1968, after a coup, he fled with his family to Ecuador and later California. His father Carlos Rodríguez-Pastor Sr. was Peru's Minister of Economy from 1982 to 1984. In 1994, his father bought Banco Internacional del Peru, but died the following year.

He was educated at the Immaculate Heart College in Lima, Peru.

In 1983, he received a bachelor's degree from the University of California, Berkeley, and in 1988, an MBA from Tuck School of Business.

== Career ==
From 1990–93, he was a vice-president at Citibank, New York City, and from 1993–95, a managing director at Banco Santander, New York.

Since 1995, he has been chairman and CEO of Intercorp; managing general partner of Nexus Group; chairman of Interbank, and a director of Royalty Pharma, Casa Andina, Interseguro, Supermercados Peruanos, Inteligo Bank, InRetail, Innova Schools, and NG Restaurants.

Rodríguez-Pastor has stated he does not care for everyone to know how rich he is, saying: "I don't see what the big deal is".

In August 2011, Bloomberg considered him one of the 8 "hidden billionaires" in the world, until, in March 2012, Forbes magazine placed him on the list of the richest. That same year he founded InRetail, a holding company which manages supermarkets (Supermercados Peruanos), shopping centers (Real Plaza) and pharmacies (InkaFarma).

== Personal life ==
He is married to Gabriela Perez Rocchietti, they have two children, and live mainly in New York City. He is the cousin of journalist Carlos Lozada.

== See also ==
- List of Peruvian billionaires by net worth
