= Sonic Ranch =

American recording studio complex

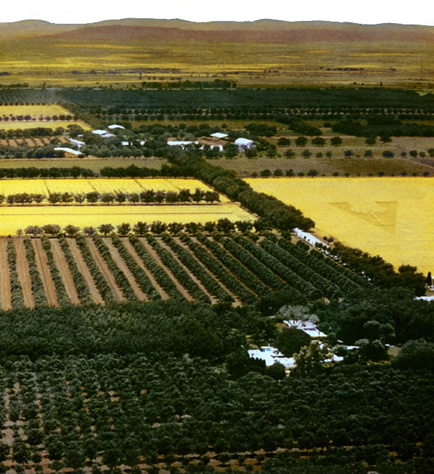
Pecan orchards at the studio complex

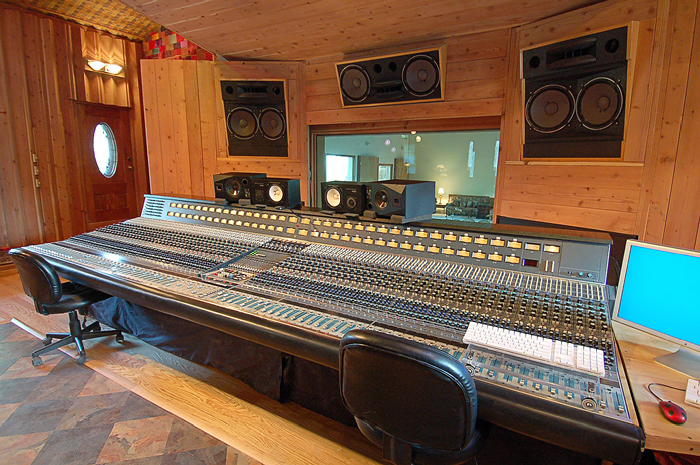
Neve console featuring an original Motown board.

Sonic Ranch, in the border town of Tornillo, Texas, is the world's largest residential recording studio complex. There are five studios designed by Vincent Van Haaff on a 1,700-acre (690 ha) pecan orchard, which borders the Rio Grande and Mexico. Located 30 miles (48 km) east of El Paso, Texas, in the border town of Tornillo, there are five houses on the property where artists stay while recording. The studio was founded in 1989 by the current owner/director Tony Rancich around a large traditional Spanish hacienda, which is an adobe structure that was built in the late 1930s, with pine-tree vigas as the ceiling structure. Some rock bands have noted the calm, rural wilderness and easy access to Ciudad Juárez across the border.

== Studio complex ==
The Neve Control Room (designed by Vincent Van Haaff) features an 80-channel vintage Neve 8078 Console with 31105 mic pre/EQs. The left side of this console was the original West Coast Motown board which was used to record many Motown artists, including Diana Ross, The Temptations, Gladys Knight, Bubba Knight, G. C. Cameron, James Jamerson, Marvin Gaye, and The Jackson 5. Madonna purchased the console and had it in her studio Brooklyn in Hollywood in the early 1990s, where Japanese musician Yoshiki purchased and put it together with another 8078 into its present form by Pat Schnider and Wess Dolly. Sonic Ranch acquired this console in 2006. The Big Tracking Room that is connected to this control room is 36 by 47 feet (11.0 m × 14.3 m) and has 22-foot-high (6.7 m) ceilings. There are two isolation booths in the Big Tracking Room and two isolation booths in the large 36-by-31-foot (11.0 m × 9.4 m) Control Room.

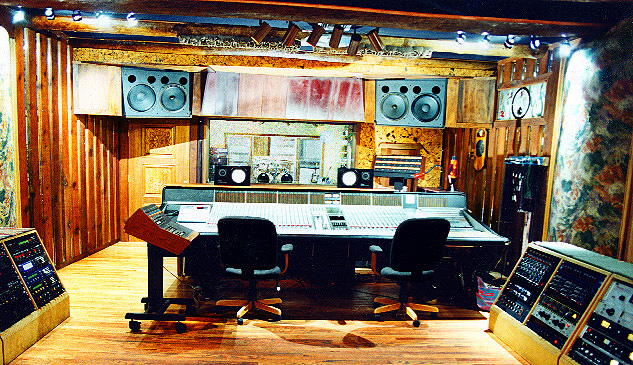
The A Studio Control Room

The A Studio, which was the first studio to be established at Sonic Ranch, is partially subterranean and features a 40-channel E/G SSL console with vintage Neve outboard mic pre/EQs and has four tracking rooms with differing acoustics and dimensions.

The Stone Room is a five-sided room made of travertine stone, with a slanted latia ceiling which optimizes acoustic diffusion. When stripped of baffles and carpets, it serves as an echo chamber during mixdown. The center tracking room, leading to the Drum Room, has carpets and absorbable material between the traditional vigas in the ceiling structure which shortens the decay time in the room and makes it suitable for vocals and electric guitar tracking.

The Drum Room has a wood floor, a slanted wood ceiling and wooden doors which can be opened or closed to adjust the ambiance of the room. The top room, which descends into the control room, contains a 6 ft 11 in (2.11 m) 1978 K. Kawai piano and a 1961 Hammond B3 with a Leslie speaker.

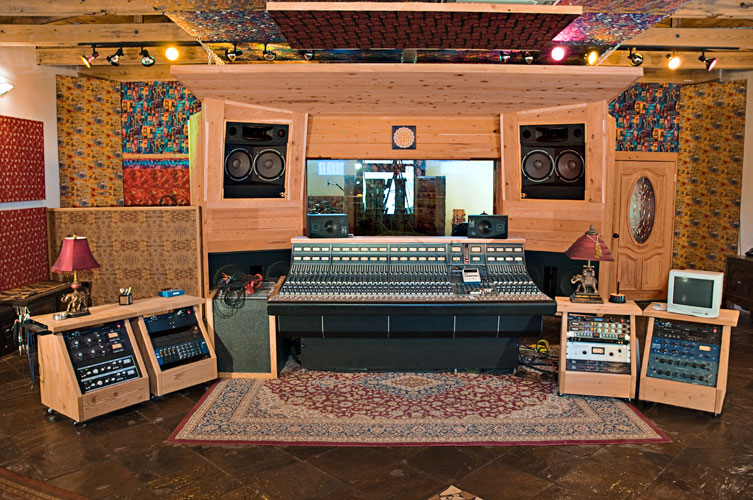
The Adobe Control Room at Sonic Ranch

The Adobe Studio was designed by Vincent Van Haaff within a hundred-year-old adobe structure with a vaulted wooden ceiling. It contains a vintage Neve 8088 console with Class A 31102 mic pre/EQs which were designed by Rupert Neve in 1977. The Adobe Tracking Room is 30 × 28 × 16 feet (9.1 × 8.5 × 4.9 m) and has geometric ceiling panels, corner and half rounds, and massive ceiling trusses to enhance acoustic diffusion. This studio is on a property that contained one of the original "Custom House" crossing points from Mexico into the United States.

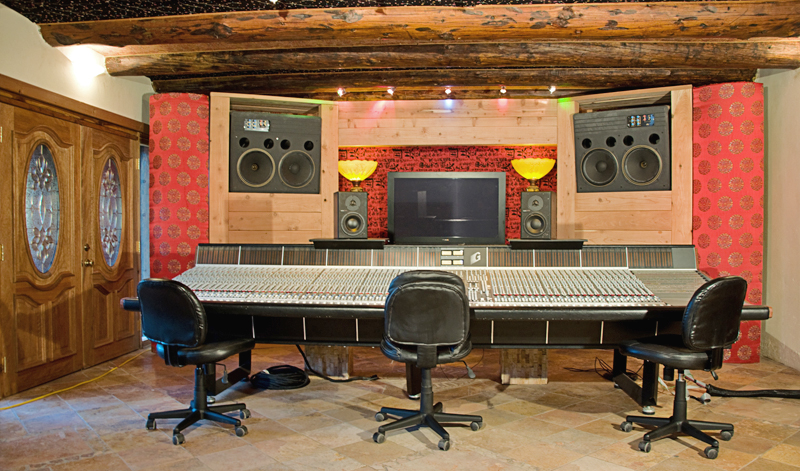
The Mix Room 64 Channel SSL G/G+

The Mix Room was designed by Vincent Van Haaff and is in the left wing of the original Spanish hacienda. It is 20 feet (6 m) wide and 40 feet (12 m) deep and contains a 64-channel SSL G/G+ console. It resides next to the swimming pool in the hacienda patio.

The Mastering Room is in the center section of the Spanish hacienda and is 18 ft (5.5 m) wide and 27 ft (8.2 m) deep. It features a Rupert Neve-designed Masterpiece. The Mastering room has wooden panels and colorful fabrics from Brussels and Paris woven into its acoustical design.

== Equipment ==
Sonic Ranch has a collection of over 55 vintage and modern guitars, 50 vintage and mod amps, 4 modern and 3 vintage drum kits, 54 guitar pedals, 1927 Steinway and 1978 K. Kawai grand pianos, and a 1961 B3 organ with 147 Leslie. The mic collection includes 3 Neumann U47 Long Body Chrome Tops, 2 Neumann M249s, 2 Neumann KM 53s and 54s, 2 Steven Paul Audio Modified Neumann U67s, 2 Neumann M269s which are the European version of U67s, 3 Neumann U87s, 3 Telefunken ELAM 251s, 2 Telefunken ELAM 250s, 2 AKG C12s, and 2 Coles 4038s.

== List of artists recorded ==
Following is a list of some of the artists who have recorded songs at Sonic Ranch:

- A Silent Film
- Akron Family
- Alex Campos
- ...And You Will Know Us by the Trail of Dead
- Aneeka
- Animal Collective
- Arion
- At The Drive-In
- Ballyhoo!
- Bandalos Chinos
- Band of Horses
- Barbara Carr
- Benny Ibarra
- Beach House
- Big Thief
- Billy Gibbons
- The Black Angels
- Blacklite District
- The Blackout
- Bon Iver
- Brand New
- Broncho
- Bullet for My Valentine
- The Burning of Rome
- Camera Can't Lie
- Cannibal Corpse
- The Chamanas
- Cloud Nothings
- Cody Jinks and the Tone Deaf Hippies
- Conor Oberst and the Mystic Valley Band
- Conociendo Rusia
- Damageplan
- David Garza
- Deep Blue Something
- Dead Sara
- DevilDriver
- The Devil Makes Three
- The Dirty Heads
- Dirty Karma
- División Minúscula
- El Cuarteto de Nos
- El Mató Un Policía Motorizado
- Elefante
- Ely Guerra
- Enrique Bunbury
- Erik Rubin
- Explosions in the Sky
- Fiona Apple
- Flotsam and Jetsam
- Flogging Molly
- Girl in a Coma
- Gogol Bordello
- Gregg Rolie
- Grouplove
- Gungor
- Hanson
- Hello Seahorse!
- Into the Presence
- Intocable
- J.R.C.G.
- James Vincent McMorrow
- Jello Biafra
- Jenny Lewis
- Jesus Adrian Romero
- Johnny Manchild and the Poor Bastards
- Johnny Rawls
- Juanes
- Jumbo
- Kalimba
- Keyland
- Kids in Glass Houses
- Kids These Days
- Koe Wetzel
- Lasso
- The Lawrence Arms
- Lennon Murphy
- Lil Yachty
- The London
- Los Bunkers
- The Maine
- The Madden Brothers
- McFly
- MercyMe
- Midland
- Ministry
- Moderatto
- Motel
- The Mountain Goats
- Mudvayne
- N17
- Natalia Lafourcade
- Nathaniel Rateliff & The Night Sweats
- The New Mastersounds
- Nevermore
- Nico Vega
- Oh Sees
- Okills
- Old 97's
- Otis Clay
- OV7
- of Montreal
- Parquet Courts
- Passafire
- Plastilina Mosh
- Poliça
- Portugal. The Man
- Prehab
- Prong
- Purple
- Radius
- Reik
- Red Sun Rising
- Rey Pila
- Rorschach Test
- Shadow Academy
- Shearwater
- Skinlab
- Sleepercar
- The Sloppy Boys
- Sparta
- Smith Westerns
- Snarky Puppy
- Starbomb
- Sublime with Rome
- Swans
- Tainy
- Taking Back Sunday
- Tesla
- This World Fair
- Turnpike Troubadours
- Ultima Victima
- Upchuck
- The Warning (Mexican band)
- Waxahatchee
- Whiskey Myers
- Whitey Morgan and the 78's
- Yeah Yeah Yeahs
- Your Vegas
- Yuridia
- Zoé

== List of producers / engineers ==
Following is a list of some of the producers and/or engineers who have recorded and/or mixed songs at Sonic Ranch:

- Alvaro Lopez
- Andrew Scheps
- Isac Esquivel
- Andy LeMaster
- Aureo Baquerio
- Bill Reynolds
- Camilo Froideval
- Chris "Frenchie" Smith
- Chad Copelin
- Charles Godfrey
- Colin Richardson
- Craig Alvin
- Dan Carey
- Dave Sitek
- Eduardo Bergaillo
- Mike Major
- Evan Peters
- Jarrod Evans
- Jason Kingsland
- Stephen Short
- Jason Perry
- Chuy Flores
- Stefano Vieni
- Alejandro Ponce
- Chris Coady
- John Congleton
- James Laughery
- Jim Gaines
- Joe Chiccarelli
- John Hill
- John Travis
- Kiko Cibrian
- Mark Lewis
- Mario Caldato Jr.
- Manuel Calderon
- Nick Launay
- Noah Shane
- Peter Walsh
- Rob Halverson
- Ryan Hewitt
- Randall Dunn
- Reid Shippen
- Stewart Sullivan
- Fabrizio Simoncioni
- Ettore Grenci
- Christopher Schoemann
- Marco Ramirez
- Tony Battaglia
- Tom Zutaut
- Jeffrey Pringle
- Phil Vinall
- Jason Suecof
- Justin Leeah
- Paul Leary
- Erik Rutan
- Robert Manning
- Justin Morris
