= Edificio Interbank =

Office building in Lima, Peru

Interbank Building
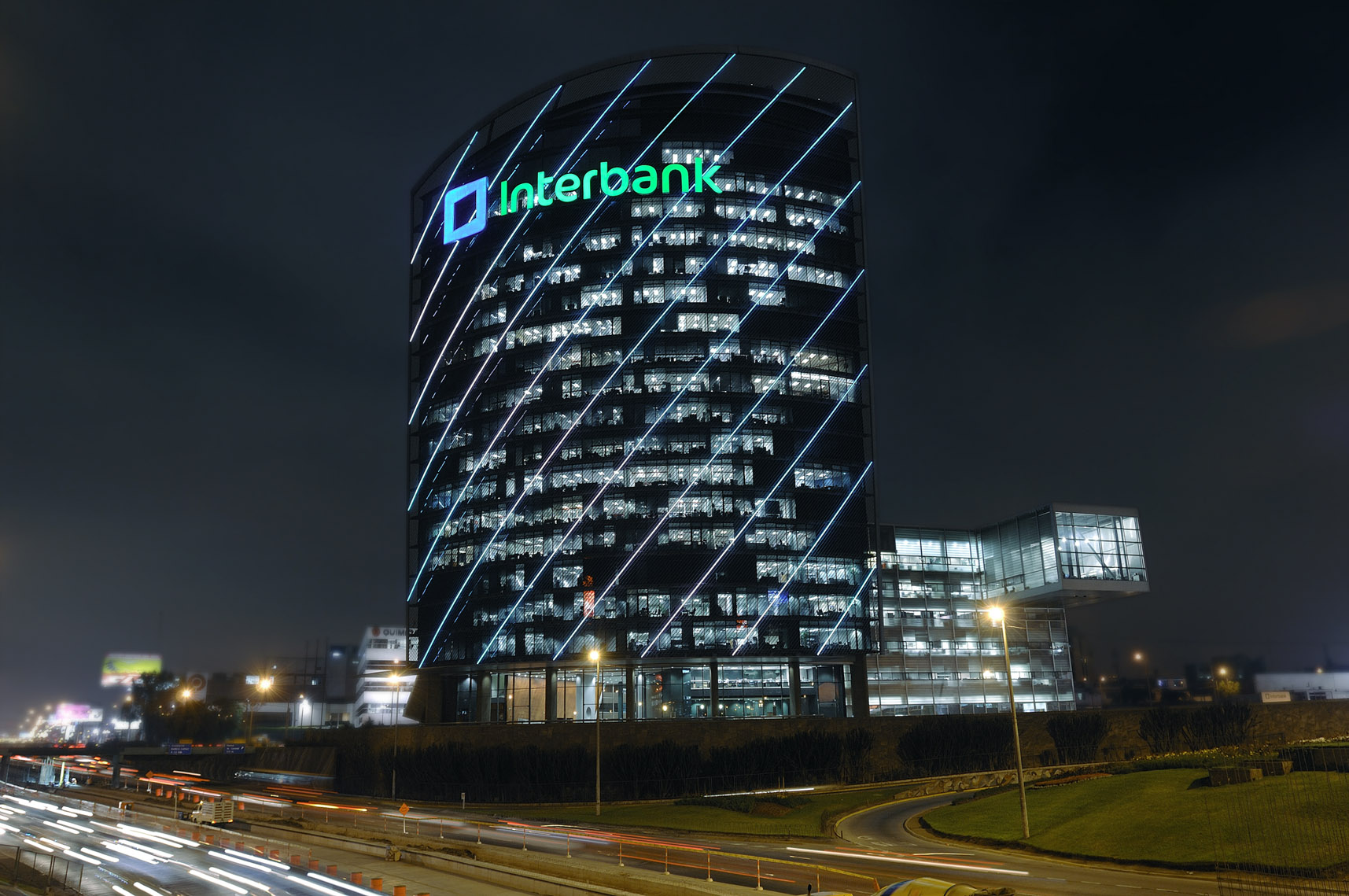
- The building at night
- Interactive map of the Interbank Building area

General information
- Location: Carlos Villarán 140
- Year built: 1996–2001
- Inaugurated: February 2001
- Cost: US$ 40,948,900
- Owner: Intercorp
- Height: 88 m

Technical details
- Floor count: 20
- Floor area: 43,500 m²

Design and construction
- Architect: Hans Hollein
- Structural engineer: Carlos Casabonne Rasselet
- Services engineer: José Tavera
- Main contractor: Cosapi

The Interbank Building is a building located in the neighbourhood of Santa Catalina, La Victoria District, Lima. It serves as the main headquarters of Interbank, a Peruvian financial entity and was inaugurated in February 2001. It is located at the intersection of Luis Bedoya Reyes and Javier Prado Este avenues. It has a total construction area of 45,300 m^{2} and a maximum height of 88 metres.

== History ==
The building's predecessor was located at the Plazoleta de la Merced in the Jirón de la Unión.

The construction was in charge of the Peruvian company Cosapi S.A. and the design by the Austrian architect Hans Hollein. This marked the end of a period of inactivity for the architect since the 1980s. This building was inaugurated at the same time as the Media Tower in Vienna. Both projects were designed in parallel. The construction period was between 1996 and 2000. The building was inaugurated in 2001.

== Overview ==
The building consists of two distinct and interlinked blocks. The first of them is the tower (Tower A) and the second (Tower B) is the six-story rectangular building with white glass exterior walls where offices and the cafeteria are located. An appendage protrudes from this block from the fourth floor. Tower A is slightly inclined, adopting the figure of a "sail in the wind" whose front is reinforced by a titanium mesh that serves both as decoration (it has a set of lights that change from the color of the institution to the characteristic colors of some special festivity) as protection from sunlight. The tower has 20 floors and reaches a maximum height of 88 metres topped with a helipad.

The inclination of the tower not only has an aesthetic function but also an anti-seismic one developed by the specialist Carlos Casabonne Rasselet. In the same way, the plinth facing the street has been made with volcanic stone from the Andes, according to ancient tradition of the Inca architecture of Peru.

== See also ==
- List of tallest buildings in Peru
- Torre Banco de la Nación
- Banco Comercial
