= Huaca Santa Catalina =

Archaeological site in Peru

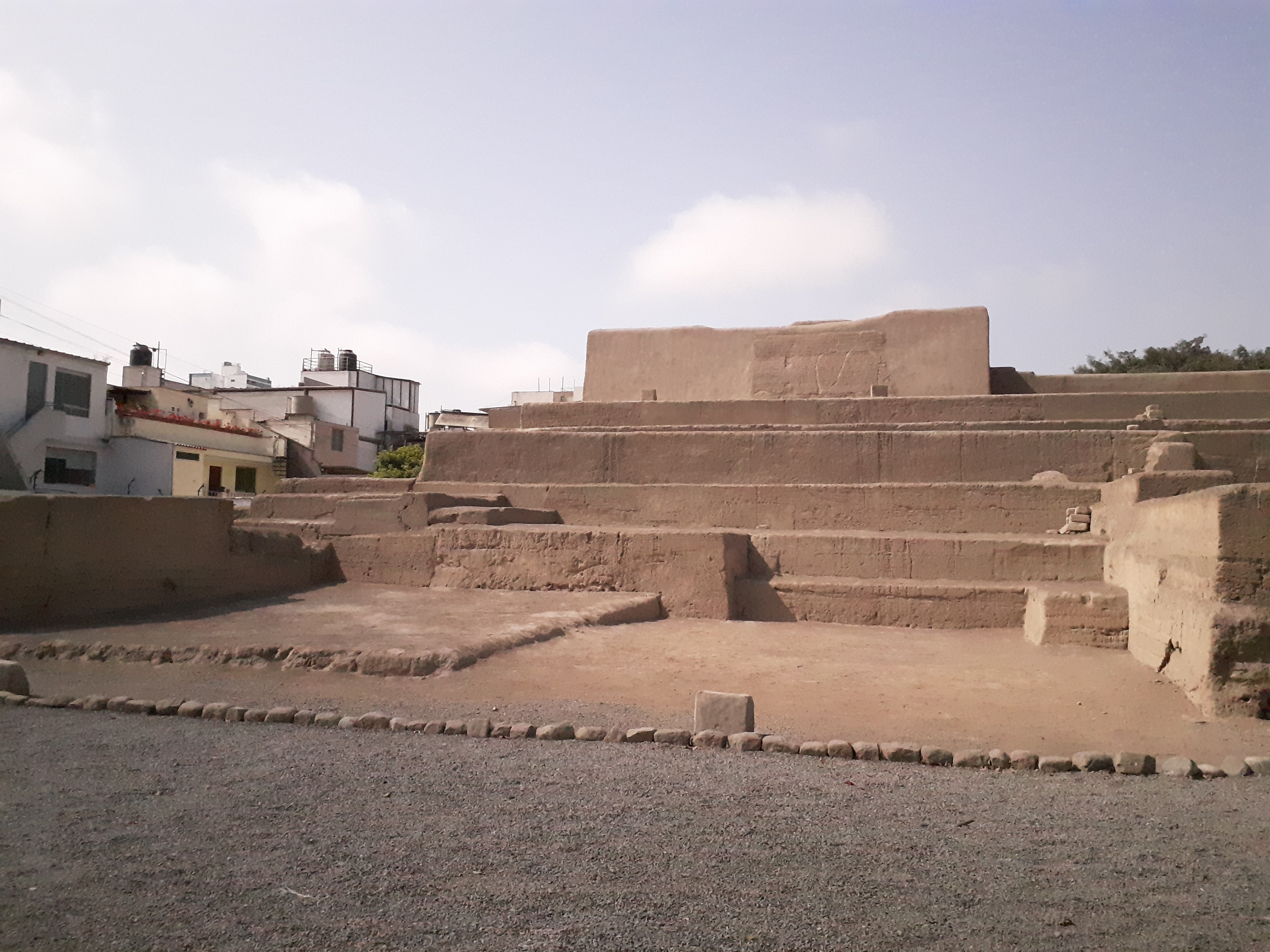
- Interactive map of Huaca Santa Catalina
- Cultures: Ichma, Inca
- Location: Santa Catalina, Lima

Huaca Santa Catalina is an archaeological site located at Jirón Pascual Saco Oliveros 875, between Miguel Checa and Pascual Saco streets, in the neighbourhood of Santa Catalina, in La Victoria District, Lima, Peru. It's one of the few remains of the Qhapaq Ñan (the Inca road system) that exist in the city.

It was an important meeting point for the two cultures that inhabited it, the Ychsmas and the Incas. For three centuries, these cultures settled in the Lurín and Rímac valleys, being expert farmers, and developing large-scale fishing and trade. It was also an important place of worship and exploration.

== See also ==
- Ichma culture
- Inca Empire
