= Prehab =

American band

Prehab, previously known as the Bedspins, is an American band that formed in 1992 in Tempe, Arizona.

== History ==
In the 1990s the band was known as the Bedspins and were a popular fixture on the Tempe music scene. Tempe was referred to as "The Next Seattle" by the music industry during this time. The band played along Tempe Arizona's Mill Avenue for many years and also played shows in New Mexico, Texas, and Oklahoma. During this time the band opened shows for bands such as Blood Hound Gang and Def Leppard. The Bedspins began working with producer Andy Barrett who had worked with Gin Blossoms and Stevie Nicks on an album of original material. The band played an average of 200 shows a year between 1993 and 1996. During this time the Bedspins were approached by Virgin Records and Island Records. Nothing materialized with either label and the band disbanded in 1997.

The death of a mutual friend brought all four members together at a funeral service in 2007. The four bandmates Chris Kay, Jason Kay, Chris Cantu and Jeff Bourne decided to reunite. This new band was called Prehab. The band had planned to record some of Chris Kay's new songs in the hopes of getting a publishing deal. The demos were eventually re-recorded at Tall Cat Studios and released as One Is Too Many (A Thousand Is Never Enough) in 2009. The band played several shows in Arizona to promote the new music. In 2011, the band began recording at Ardent Studios with producer John Hampton. I Haven't Been Completely Honest was released in 2012.

Drummer Jeff Bourne left Prehab in 2013. The band then added Phillip Rhodes (Gin Blossoms). Prehab began writing songs with Rhodes and playing shows in Arizona. In 2014 band went to Sonic Ranch in El Paso with producer Owen Morris. Prehab released Light Up The Sky in 2015. The album was added to Pandora Radio and played on college radio.
