= Dirty Karma =

Indie rock band in Mexico City (2005-2011)

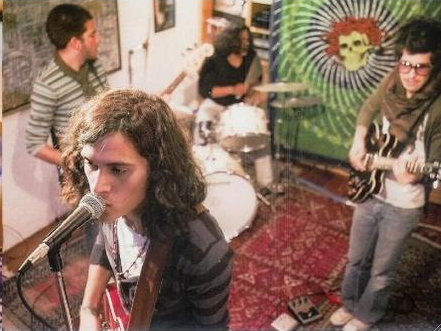

Background information
- Origin: Mexico City, Mexico
- Genres: Indie, psychedelic, blues rock
- Years active: 2005–2011
- Members: Mauricio "Mau" García (2005-2011); Gerardo Gabilondo (2005-2010); Hugo Barreto (fl. 2005-2010); Rodrigo Blanco (2005-2011)
- Website: www.dirtykarma.com.mx

Dirty Karma was an indie rock band from Mexico City, Mexico. Performing in Spanish and English, they were active from 2005 to 2011.

In 2005, the band was formed by lead singer and guitarist Mauricio "Mau" García, drummer Hugo Barreto, bassist Gerardo Gabilondo, and guitarist Rodrigo Blanco. In 2008, they recorded a self-titled, 5-song EP in TOPETITUD Studios (owned by Paco Ayala and Tito Fuentes of Molotov) that was mastered by Chris Geringer (who had worked with Madonna, Rihanna, Molotov, and The Dandy Warhols). Considered blues and psychedelic rock, their influences included Devendra Banhart's "Inaniel" (2005), Mescalito, Aliados, and The Mars Volta's "Wax Simulacra" (2007).

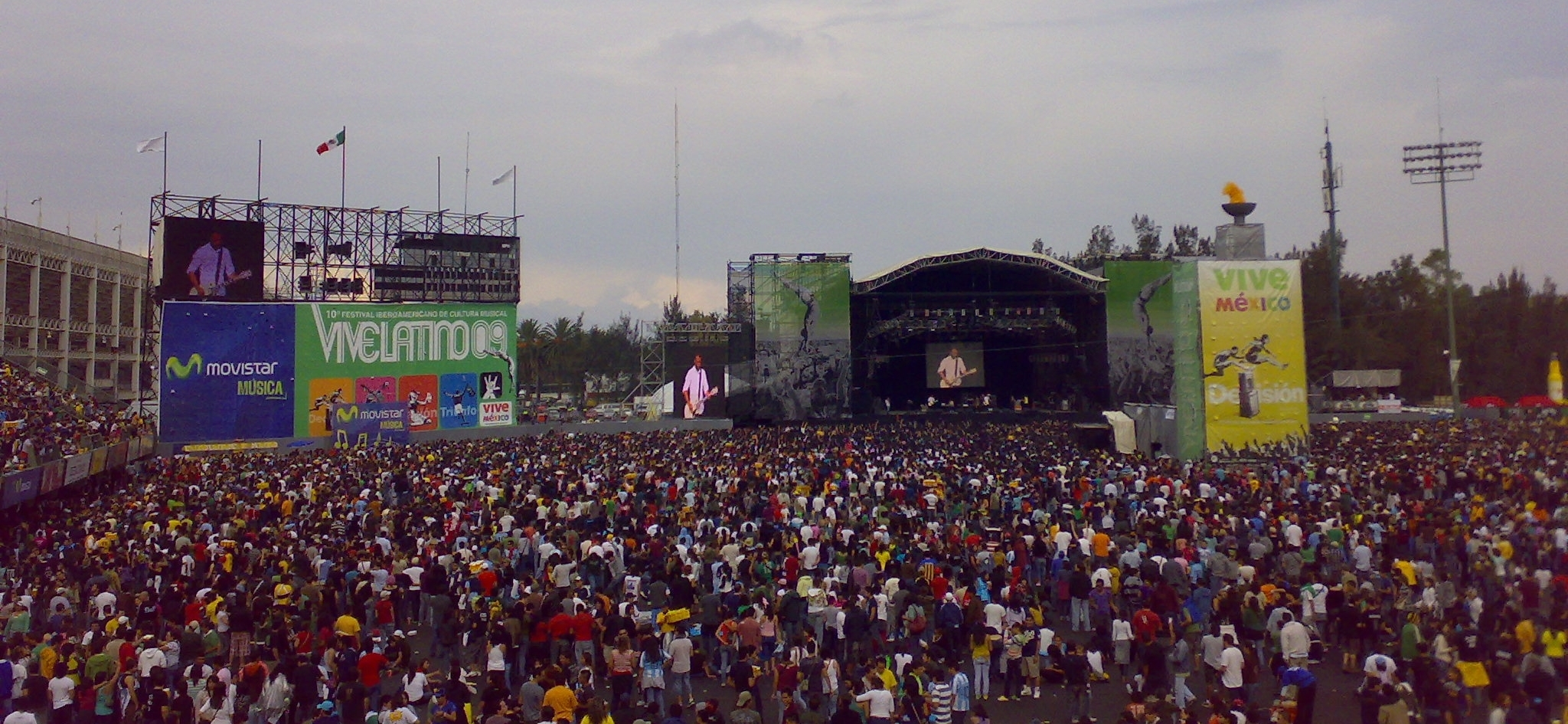
Vive Latino 2009 crowd

In 2009, the band were invited to the Vive Latino festival, an annual rock music festival held in Mexico City. They played in the blue section with Mongol Gol Gol, Enjambre, Monocordio, and Ximena Sariñana. During the year's activism for higher education reform, they also played at the "Rock por la Educación" festival, held by the Alianza Joven por la Democracia Participativa A.C., alongside other small bands. In 2010, Gerardo Gabilondo left Dirty Karma to join The Y's. The same year, Dirty Karma released their debut album Four Elephants, recorded in Tornillo, Texas at Sonic Ranch Studios. In an interview, García explained much of the content was inspired by their experience at Vive Latino 2009. During the first Corona Capital, they performed with artists that influenced them like the Pixies and Interpol.

In 2011, Rodrigo Blanco joined Rey Pila. Their largest annual performance was at the indie rock ITLAFest 2011 in Pachuca, Hidalgo. That same year, Dirty Karma disbanded and García's second band Le Barón disintegrated. Accordingly, while performing for Disco Ruido and Zoé, among others, he began forming Costera, which released its first album in March 2017. Zoé singer León Larregui, Zoé bassist Rodrigo Guardiola, and Gabilondo aided in the album's production.

== Discography ==
=== Album ===
- Four Elephants - (2010)

=== EP ===
- Dirty Karma - (2008)
