= Santa Catalina, Lima =

Neighbourhood in Peru

Santa Catalina
- Neighbourhood
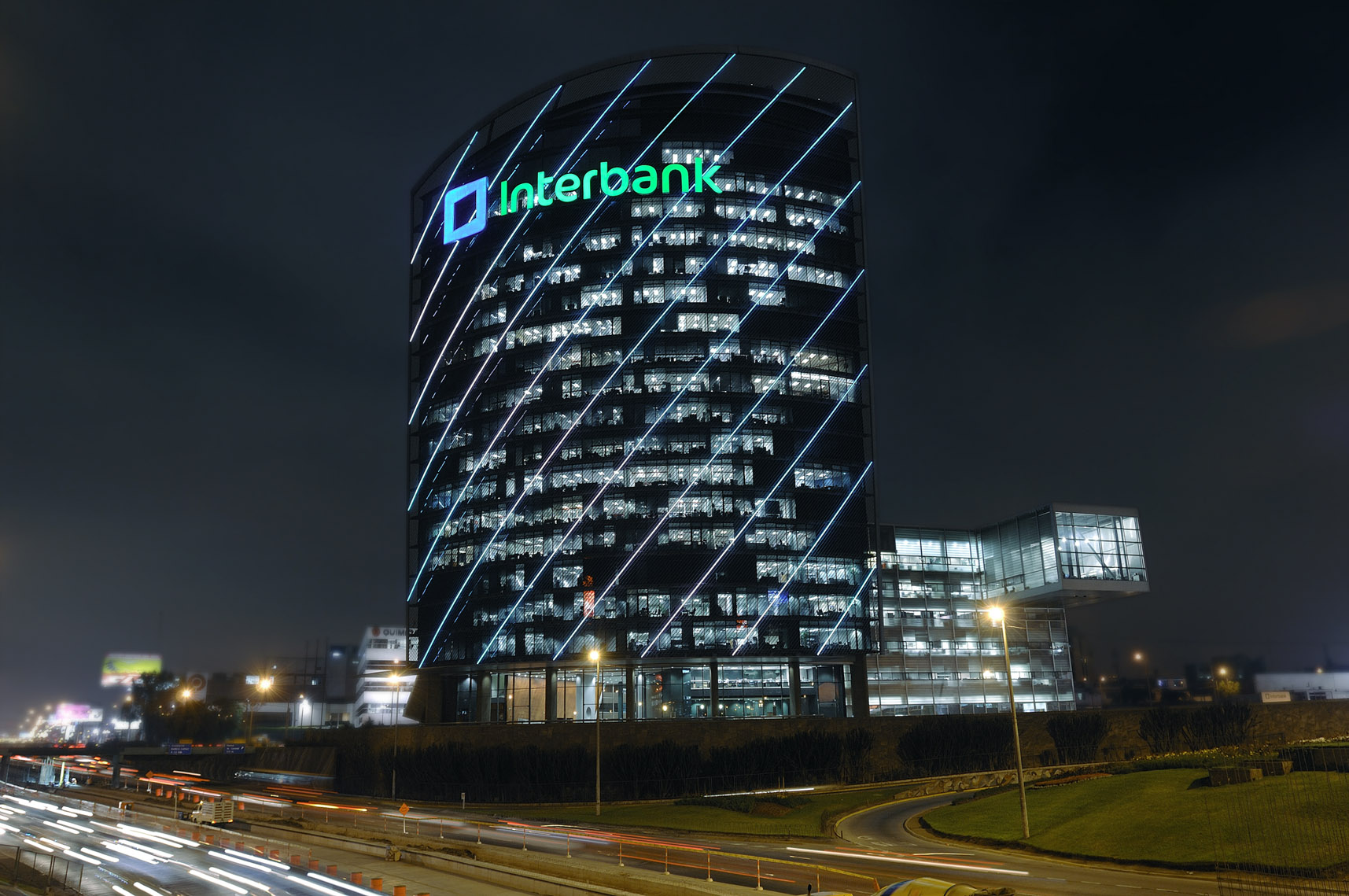
- Interbank Building
- Interactive map of Santa Catalina
- Country: Peru
- Department: Lima
- Province: Lima
- District: La Victoria
- Established: 1906
- Time zone: UTC-5 (PET)

Santa Catalina is a neighbourhood in La Victoria District, Lima, Peru. Originally an Ichma settlement, it is currently an area inhabited by upper middle class families, making it the best consolidated area of the district, where it is the epicenter of construction for many real estate companies. Likewise, it is where the tallest residential buildings in Lima are located. It is considered the safest and best looking area in the district.

== History ==
In its beginnings, Santa Catalina was mostly corn fields, and along with neighbouring Balconcillo, it belonged to the Miraflores District. In 1906, after these two areas were founded as an urbanisation, they were annexed to the Lima District. However, in 1920, when the La Victoria District was created, both urbanisations ended up being annexed to this new district. Throughout the 20th century, Santa Catalina housed houses of a medium-high socioeconomic level, which continues to this day.

Some time later, in the year 2000, it was proposed in Congress that Santa Catalina would be separated from La Victoria, and together with the urbanisations of Balconcillo, Monte Carmelo, La Pólvora, Túpac Amaru and Apolo they would form a new district. Where, from north to south, it would start from México Avenue to Javier Prado Avenue. And from west to east, from Paseo de la República avenue to San Luis, Nicolás Arriola, Aviación and Luis Aldana avenues. However, the project was shelved after the presidential vacancy process against Alberto Fujimori, that same year.

Currently, the urbanisation has had a change in zoning, going from two or three-storey houses to residential buildings of 7 to 37 floors. Likewise, new business buildings have been located. Which led to a large part of the area being modernised and assimilated to its surrounding districts such as San Borja and San Isidro.

In 2025, Intercorp acquired the former Química Suiza building, located immediately behind it. Built during the 1960s, it was meant to be demolished and replaced by the Torre Abril, a planned residential skyscraper to be built by the construction company of the same name as the city's tallest building, with 45 floors and a height of over 150 metres (490 ft), and a total of around 1,750 apartments.

== See also ==
- La Victoria District, Lima
- Huaca Santa Catalina
