= Intercorp Financial Services =

Intercorp Financial Services Inc.
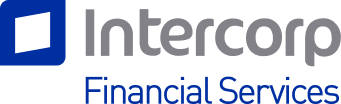
- Formerly: Intergroup Financial Services Corp.
- Company type: Holding
- Traded as: Nasdaq: IFS; BVL: IFS
- Industry: Financial services
- Founded: 2006; 20 years ago
- Headquarters: Panama City, Panama
- Area served: Peru
- Key people: Carlos Rodríguez-Pastor (chairman); Luis Felipe Castellanos López (CEO)
- Products: Banking services, insurance, wealth management
- Revenue: ▼US$317.27 million (2023)
- Net income: ▼US$276.29 million (2023)
- Total assets: ▲US$2.85 billion (2023)
- Owners: Intercorp (70.64%); Public float (29.36%)
- Subsidiaries: Interbank; Interseguro; Inteligo
- Website: www.ifs.com.pe

Intercorp Financial Services (IFS) is a Peruvian financial holding company based in Panama that is the controller of Interbank, Interseguro, and Inteligo. It is headquartered in Panama City, but its subsidiaries are based in Lima, Peru.

IFS group holds the assets in which the Group operates in the financial industry in Peru with its subsidiaries Interbank and Interseguro.

== History ==
IFS was created in 2006 after a corporate restructuring of IFH (Intercorp) to simplify its participation in Peru's financial services industry. Initially incorporated in Panama as Intergroup Financial Services Corp., it was renamed Intercorp Financial Services Inc. in 2012. Despite its incorporation in Panama, IFS conducts its business activities exclusively in Peru.

== See also ==
- Intercorp
