= Alejandro Ponce =

Peruvian economist

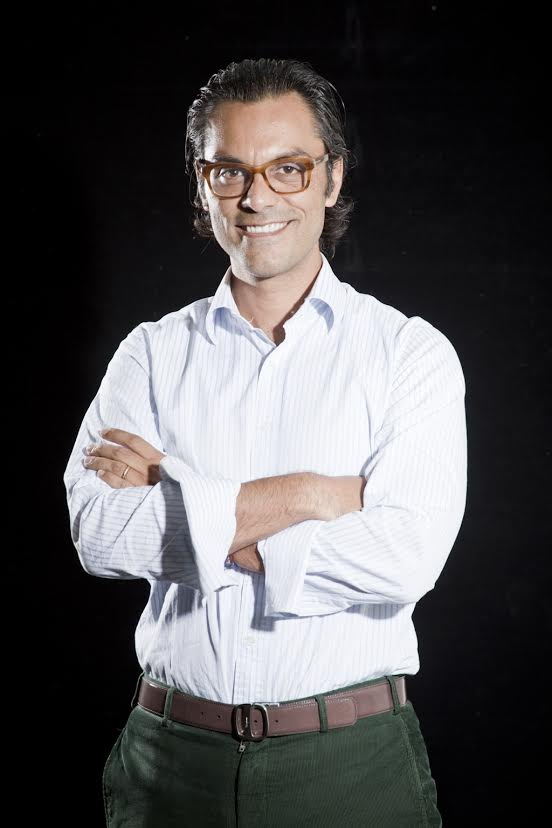

Alejandro Ponce (born May 3, 1970) is a Peruvian economist, global investor, and entrepreneur. He is one of the founders of Nexus Group (founded 1998), the largest Peruvian private equity firm with total commitments of about 1 billion. For 17 years, Alejandro acted as Managing Partner, and was responsible for creating and sourcing new ventures and investment opportunities, as well as strategic monitoring of the portfolio companies. In 2015, Alejandro decided to leave Nexus Group, expanding his investment scope and founding ToN Ventures, an angel investment fund with 25 minority stake investments in innovative technology ventures, mainly based in Israel and the Silicon Valley.

In 2016, after attending Singularity University's Global Solutions Program, Alejandro founded 01Labs and 01Ventures. 01Labs is a venture builder, to launch in Latin American companies that leverage the rise of exponential technologies and incorporate human-centered design. 01Ventures is an early stage fund that offers Latin American investors and corporations access to technology startups in Israel and Silicon Valley. 01Ventures co-invests alongside top venture capital firms and accelerators, eager to offer their portfolio companies access to the Latin American market.

His areas of expertise and experience lie within startups, turnaround and growth investment, and back in 2013, he was also named one of the Top 50 most influential people in Latin American private equity by Private Equity World.

The most important companies he has founded includes Nexus Group, Cineplanet, Casa Andina, Innova Schools, Oechsle, Promart, and ToN Ventures, the newest and most important in the future being 01_Labs and 01_Ventures.

== Early life and education ==
Alejandro Ponce graduated with Honors from University of the Pacific in Lima, Peru. He was recognized as one of the highest achievers at Pacifico, being honored with the Robert Maes Award, given each year to students who succeed in gaining first place in academic performance in the various programs offered by the university. He then moved to the United States, in order to study there, and finally gain an MBA from Wharton School of the University of Pennsylvania.

In 2016, Ponce received a full scholarship from Google to attend Singularity University’s Global Solutions Program, deepening his expertise in exponential technologies.

== Career ==
Ponce began his professional career as an Analyst at Interinvest (Investment Bank in Peru) and during his MBA he worked for Salomon Smith Barney, a Wall Street investment bank that went on to become the investment banking operations of Citigroup after a merger in 1998.

In 1998, at age 28, he founded Nexus Group with Rafael Dasso, Carlos Rodríguez Pastor, and Jose Antonio Rosas. As a managing partner he has been responsible for sourcing new ventures and investment opportunities as well as strategic monitoring of the portfolio companies. Since the beginning of his professional career in Nexus Group, he has been responsible for the acquisition or creation of companies such as Cineplanet, Casa Andina, Innova Schools, Oechsle, Promart, Supermercados Peruanos, Inkafarma, Peruplast, Bembos, UTP, Chinawok, Dunkin Donuts, Don Belisario, Popeyes, Papa John's, SMI and Ipae.

In 2011, he led Nexus Group to raise its first institutional private equity fund NGCP I (Nexus Capital Partners I) with total commitments of $320 million.

In 2012, Ponce participated in IPO (Initial Public offering) of Inretail, one of the Nexus's portfolio of $460 million.

In 2013, he led Nexus Group to raise its second institutional private equity fund NGCP II (Nexus Capital Partners II) with total commitments of $600 million.

In 2015, Ponce decided to leave Nexus Group, expanding his investment scope, and founding ToN Ventures.

In 2016, after attending Singularity University's Global Solutions Program, Ponce founded 01Labs and 01Ventures.

== Other duties ==
He is a member of the council of the EMPEA (Emerging Markets Private Equity Association), a global industry, independent non-profit organization for private capital in emerging markets.

He climbed, but did not summit, Mount Everest.

== Awards and recognition ==
- 1993: Robert Maes Especial Award from Universidad del Pacifico in 1993. Best student in his 5 years of university studies.
- 2010: Appointed as “one of the Top 25 best young person that would transform the Peruvian economy” by Semana Económica for its 25 Anniversary.
- 2013: Appointed as “one of the Top 50 most influential people in Latin American private equity today” by Private Equity World.
