= What Were We Thinking =

2020 book by Carlos Lozada

- Author: Carlos Lozada
- Original title: What Were We Thinking: A Brief Intellectual History of the Trump Era
- Language: English
- Subject: Politics
- Genre: Non Fiction, Political
- Publisher: Simon & Schuster
- Publication date: July 21, 2020
- Publication place: United States
- Media type: Print (paperback and eBook)
- Pages: 272 pages
- ISBN: 978-1-9821-4562-0
- OCLC: 1197751331

What Were We Thinking: A Brief Intellectual History of the Trump Era is a non-fiction book by Carlos Lozada, published in 2020. In the work, Lozada critically examines over 150 books written about Donald Trump and the political, social, and cultural dynamics of his first presidency. The book explores the range of debates, ideas, and anxieties that have emerged during the Trump era, with a focus on how the American public and intellectual class have processed and responded to his presidency.

== Reception ==
The book received positive reviews from critics, who commended Lozada's ability to analyze and synthesize a large body of literature. Reviewers appreciated the balanced critique of both liberal and conservative perspectives on the Trump presidency. Additionally, Lozada's examination of broader themes, such as political polarization and institutional failures, was noted as a significant contribution to understanding the intellectual and cultural responses to Trump's time in office.

== See also ==
- Carlos Lozada (journalist)
- Bibliography of Donald Trump
