= Carlos Lozada (journalist) =

Peruvian-American journalist (born 1971)

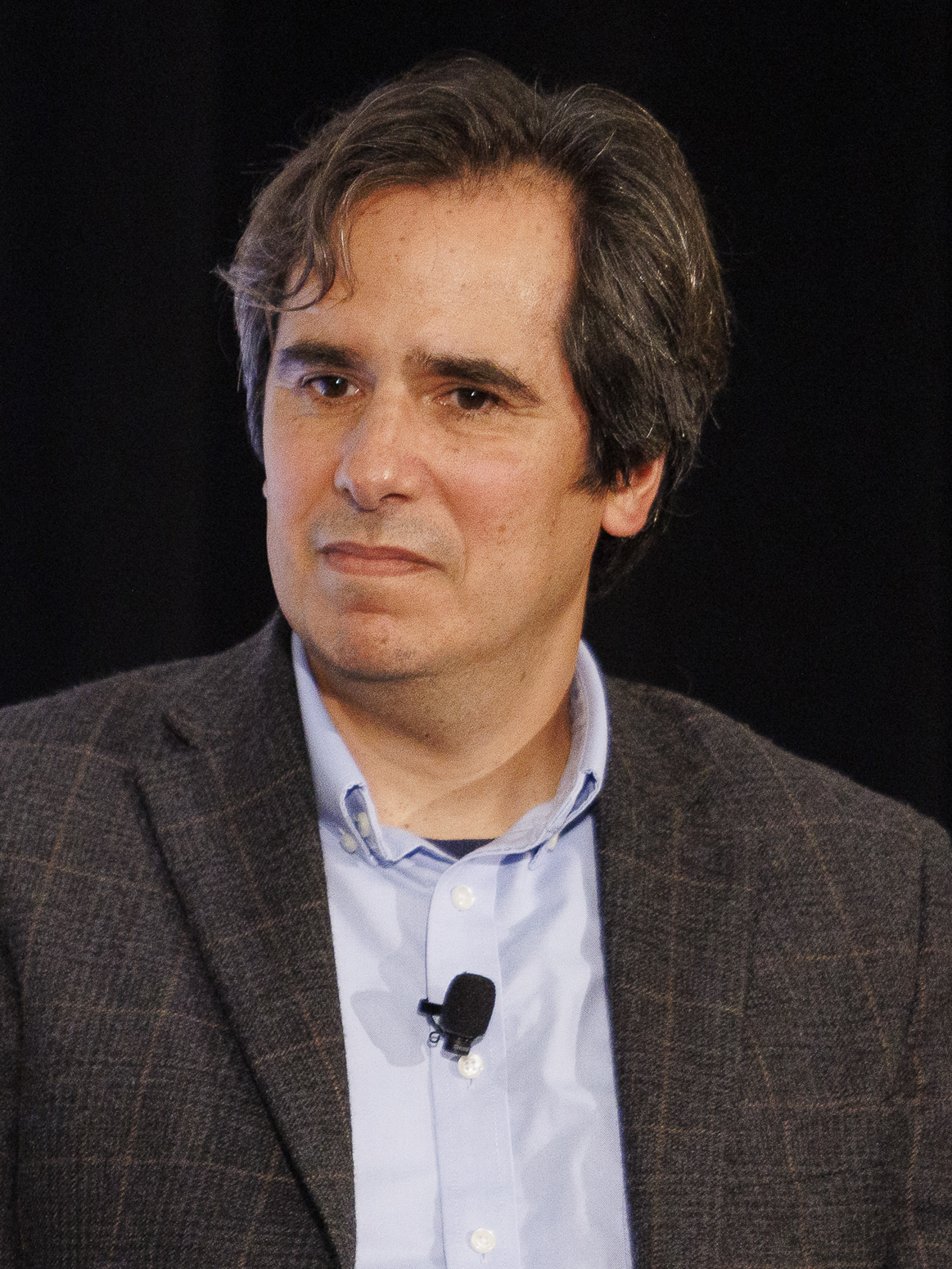
- Lozada in 2024
- Born: Carlos Eduardo Francisco Lozada Rodríguez-Pastor; November 1, 1971 (age 54); Lima, Peru
- Education: University of Notre Dame (BA); Princeton University (MPA)
- Occupation: Journalist
- Awards: Pulitzer Prize for Criticism (2019); NBCC's Nona Balakian Citation for Excellence in Reviewing (2015)

Carlos Eduardo Lozada (born November 1, 1971) is a Peruvian-American journalist and author. He joined New York Times Opinion as a columnist in 2022, after 17-years with the The Washington Post, where he began in 2005 and worked his way through the editorial ranks to become the paper's nonfiction book critic in 2015.

Among other awards, Lozada was recognized with a National Book Critics Circle Award, the Nona Balakian Citation for Excellence in Reviewing, in 2015, the Pulitzer Prize for Criticism in 2019. and a Washington Monthly Kukula Award for Excellence in Nonfiction Book Reviewing his piece on a Robin DiAngelo work in 2021.

Lozada was an adjunct professor of political science and journalism with the University of Notre Dame's Washington Program, teaching in that program from 2009 to 2021. He is the author of What Were We Thinking: A Brief Intellectual History of the Trump Era (2020), and The Washington Book: How to Read Politics and Politicians (2024), both published by Simon & Schuster.

== Early life and education ==
Carlos Eduardo Lozada was born on November 1, 1971, in Lima, Peru, to two prominent families on both his mother's and his father's side. (He is a nephew of businessman and politician Carlos Rodríguez-Pastor Sr. and cousin of billionaire businessman Carlos Rodríguez-Pastor, both on his mother's side, while he belongs to the Lozada family on his father's side.)

By his description in interview, Lozada's family immigrated to Northern California when he was three years old, from Lima, Peru; he goes on to say that he later returned to Peru at age 10, where he lived until completing high school. He went on to earn a bachelor's degree in economics and political science from the University of Notre Dame in 1993. In 1997, he graduated from the Woodrow Wilson School of Public and International Affairs at Princeton University, with a master's degree in public administration.

== Career ==
=== Writing ===
After graduating in 1997, Lozada worked as an economic analyst at the Federal Reserve Bank of Atlanta in Atlanta, Georgia. Lozada joined the magazine Foreign Policy, in Washington, D.C., as an associate editor in 1999, and, eventually, the magazine's managing editor. He joined the staff of The Washington Post in 2005 and serving in turn as economics editor, national security editor, and Sunday Outlook editor, becoming the paper's nonfiction book critic in 2015.

He joined New York Times Opinion as a columnist in September 2022, where he was also cohost of the weekly "Matter of Opinion" podcast from 2023 to 2025.

=== Teaching ===
Lozada joined the University of Notre Dame Faculty in 2009 as an adjunct professor for the Washington Program, a position he held at least until January 2021, where he taught a course on American political journalism. In 2024, he was appointed a visiting professor of the practice for public discourse at the University of Notre Dame's Institute for Ethics and the Common Good.

Lozada has also been a visiting scholar at the Carnegie Endowment for International Peace, and a practitioner in residence at the University of Notre Dame's Institute for Advanced Study.

== Published works ==
Lozada was, as of 2024, the author of two book-length works, What Were We Thinking (2020), and The Washington Book (2024), both from Simon & Schuster:

- Lozada, Carlos (6 October 2020). What Were We Thinking: A Brief Intellectual History of the Trump Era (1st ed.). New York, NY: Simon & Schuster. ISBN 9781982145620. OCLC 1197751331. Note, corroboration for this as the first edition is found at this other site.
- —, — (27 February 2024). The Washington Book: How to Read Politics and Politicians (1st ed.). New York, NY: Simon & Schuster. ISBN 9781668050736. OCLC 1422897918. See also Simon & Schuster's site for the book. Note, corroboration for this as the first edition and for its OCLC is found at this other site.

== Awards and recognition ==
In an early career recognition, Lozada was named a 2004–2005 Knight-Bagehot Fellow in Business and Economics Journalism at Columbia University in New York. In 2015, Lozada received a National Book Critics Circle Award, the Nona Balakian Citation for Excellence in Reviewing,

Lozada was named a finalist for the Pulitzer Prize in the Criticism category, in 2018, for 10 works appearing in The Washington Post from February through December 2017. and he won that Prize for Criticism in 2019. with the Pulitzer Prize Board citing his "trenchant and searching reviews and essays that joined warm emotion and careful analysis in examining a broad range of books addressing government and the American experience." Lozada was also elected to serve as a judge on that Board in November 2019.

In 2021, Lozada was one of two recipients of Washington Monthly magazine's 2021 Kukula Award for Excellence in Nonfiction Book Reviewing, an award "highlighting ... high-quality reviews of serious, public affairs-focused books", given in memory of that magazine's books editor, Kukula Kapoor Glastris; Lozada won in their "larger publications category", for his review of White Fragility: Why It’s So Hard for White People to Talk About Racism, by Robin DiAngelo. Also in 2021, Lozada was named by Carnegie Corporation of New York as an honoree of the Great Immigrants Award, and in 2024, elected a fellow of the American Academy of Arts and Sciences.

== Personal life ==
On his being named to the Pulitzer Prize Board in November 2019, Lozada was described as having a wife and three children, which he had also stated in November 2017, in interview, referring to the children as young at that time. As of November 2019, Lozada was described as residing with his family in New York, while as of April 2024, Lozada was described as residing in Bethesda, Maryland.
