= Carlos Rodríguez-Pastor Sr. =

Peruvian politician and businessman

- Born: Carlos Rodríguez-Pastor Mendoza; 1934; Lima, Peru
- Died: 5 August 1995 (aged 60–61); Detroit, Michigan, U.S.
- Occupations: Businessman and politician
- Known for: Minister of Economy and Finance (1983-1984)
- Spouse: Haydée Persivale Serrano
- Children: Carlos Rodríguez-Pastor

Carlos Rodríguez-Pastor Mendoza (1934 - 5 August 1995) was a Peruvian businessman and politician.

He was Peru's Minister of Economy and Finance from 1983 to 1984. In 1994, he bought Banco Internacional del Peru, but died the following year.

He is the father of the billionaire businessman Carlos Rodríguez-Pastor, and uncle of journalist Carlos Lozada.
