= Dunkelvolk =

Peruvian clothing company

- Founded: 1996
- Headquarters: Lima, Peru
- Products: apparel
- Website: www.dunkelvolk.com

Dunkelvolk is a Peruvian company manufacturing clothes for surfing, skateboarding, BMX and snowboarding.

The word Dunkelvolk is German and means Dark Nation.

The company was created in 1996 by its founders Dieter Zúñiga and Jano Sayán, both sought extreme sports. In 1996, when the skateboarding became in vogue they saw an opportunity in making baggy pants especially for skaters. The pants were soon sold out and the founders called their brothers, Micky Zúñiga and Pablo Sayán, to manufacture additionally 300 pants which were also sold. They followed with t-shirts, jeans and then clothes for skaters and surfers.

Until 2003, Dunkelvolk was a brand mostly for skaters. In 2003 the company expanded its product line and hosted the Peruvian surfer Javier Swayne.

Today the Pride Corporation S.R.L.(Lima), owner of the brand Dunkelvolk, manufactures and markets in Peru, but also exports to other countries as United States, Spain, Venezuela, Ecuador, Brazil, Austria and Australia.
