= Bembos =

Peruvian fast food chain

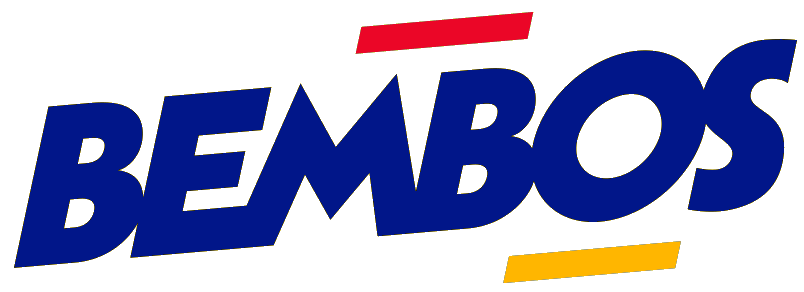
- Type: Public
- Industry: Fast Food
- Founded: 11 June 1988; 38 years ago in Lima, Peru
- Headquarters: Lima, Peru
- Products: Fast Food (including hamburgers, chicken products, french fries, milkshakes, salads, desserts, and children's meal ensembles)
- Parent: Bembos S.A.C.
- Website: bembos.com.pe

Bembos is a Peruvian fast food restaurant chain. Founded in 1988 by Carlos Camino and Mirko Cermak, it is one of the country's main fast food chains, known for its menu and its restaurants' unusual architecture. It offers hamburgers, often with Peruvian-influenced variations.

Bembos operates several restaurants nationwide. It mixes spices into their meat, giving a distinct taste and appearance and, like other restaurants in the country, they serve ají (a pepper-based sauce) on the side.

== History ==
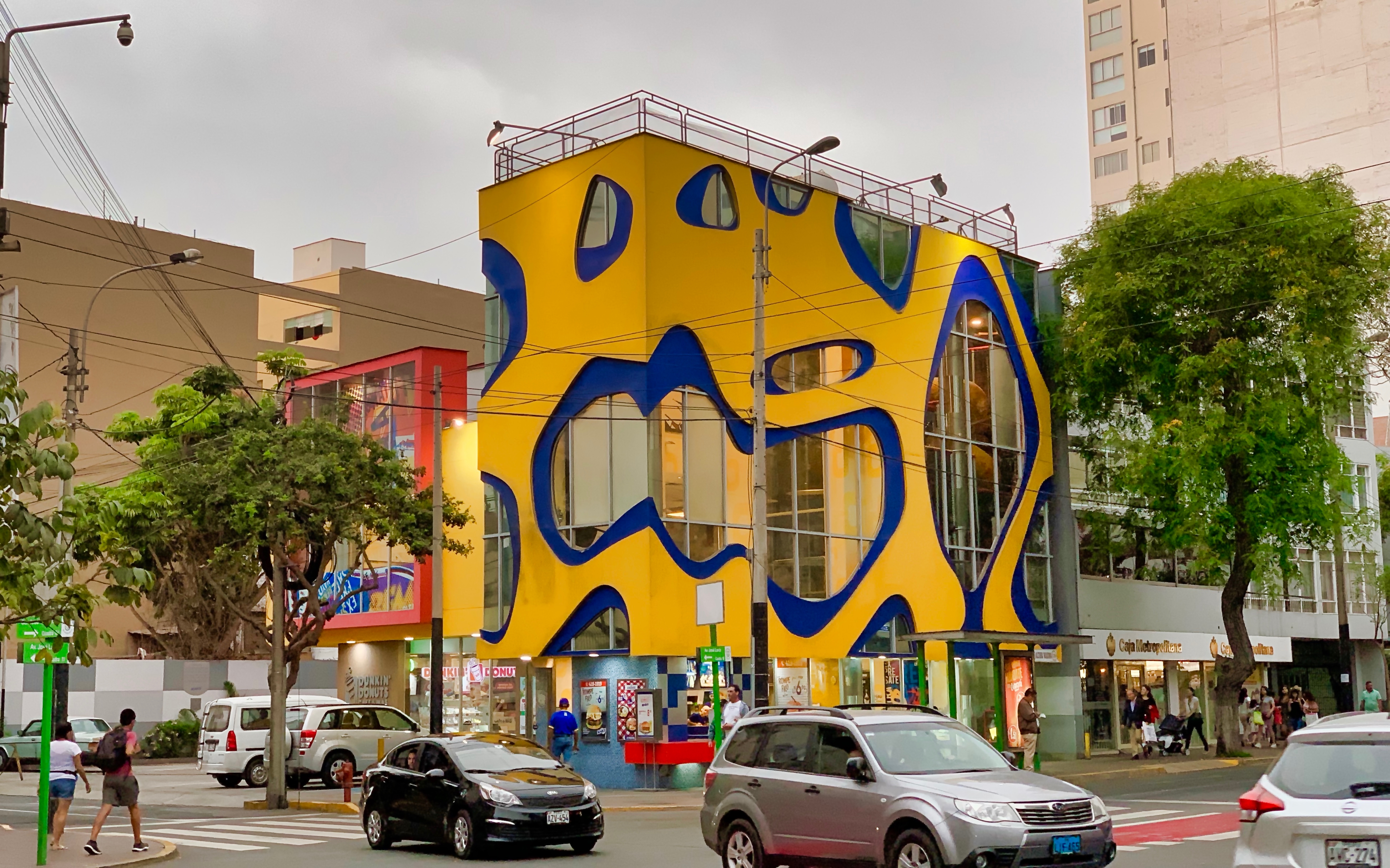
A Bembos restaurant in Miraflores.

Bembos was established in 1988 by friends and business partners Carlos Camino and Mirko Cermak in response to a lack of fast food chains in the country. At the time, the country was in the middle of an economic crisis and the only chain of its type was Océano Azul. The duo rented a commercial space at Benavides 454, located in central Miraflores, an upper-class district of Lima.

The aforementioned restaurant began operations on June 11, and was succeeded by a second location at San Isidro. This was followed by the opening of rival brands Burger King (1994) and McDonald's (1996), after which a delivery service, the first in the country, was implemented by the year 2000. By the time the aforementioned brands had reached the country, Bembos already operated 12 restaurants.

Following a deal with Arun Kumar Kapur, an Indian businessman based in Peru, Bembos opened its first restaurant in Mumbai in 2005. In 2007, it opened another branch in the same city. This was followed by the opening of restaurants in Noida and New Delhi. In July 2007, a restaurant opened in Cusco, becoming the first national or international establishment of its type in the city. By 2008, another restaurant opened in Panama City, followed by another location in Guatemala City, inaugurated in May 2009. The company also planned to enter the Chilean market.

In March 2011, Bembos was acquired by Intercorp, owner of Interbank. The purchase did not include the overseas franchises outside of Peru. The Indian franchises in Mumbai and Delhi were close down later that year, and the Guatemalan franchise also ceased operations.

As of 2023, Bembos operates over 100 restaurants in the country. These restaurants are located in Lima, Arequipa, Cajamarca, Chiclayo, Cuzco, Ica, Piura, Puno, Tacna, and Trujillo. Throughout its history, it has used several slogans, such as La mejor hamburguesa y más (lit. 'The best burger, and more'), Como Bembos no hay otra (lit. 'There's nothing like Bembos'), and Definitivamente vas a volver (lit. 'You'll definitely return').

== See also ==
- Peruvian cuisine
