= GlobalNet =

- Operating area: Peru
- ATMs: 1403
- Owner: Interbank
- Website: www.globalnet.com.pe

Global Net is an interbank network in Peru operated by Peruvian bank "Interbank".

ATMs are available all over Peru. GlobalNet ATMs work with any Cirrus, PLUS, American Express, Diners Club, MasterCard, or Visa card. Every bank's ATMs are on the GlobalNet system including Falabella's CMR and Ripley's credit card.

On this ATM, users also have the possibility of making deposits, or paying their credit card bills.
