= Cineplanet =

Peruvian cinema company

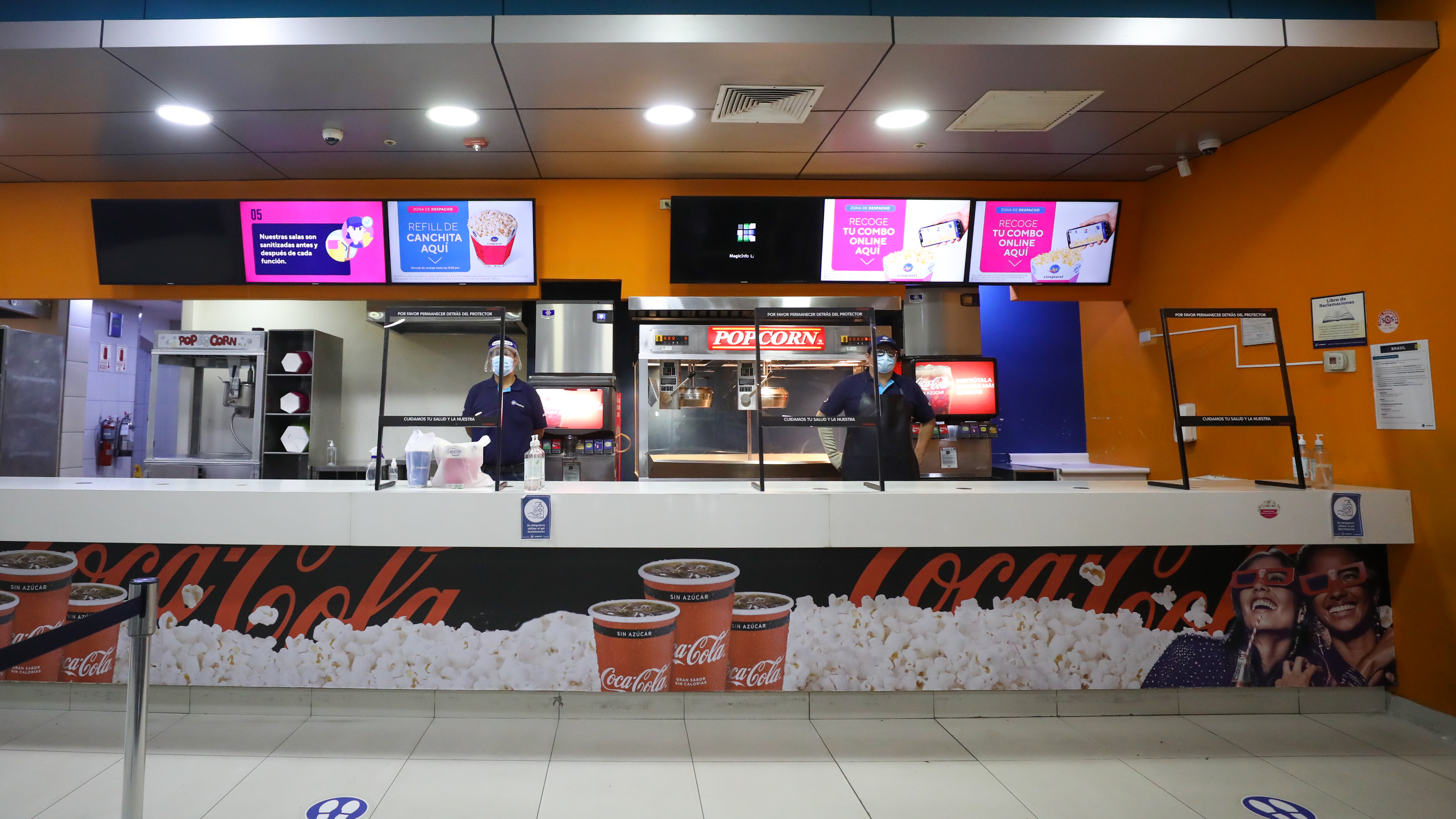
- Trade name: Cineplanet
- Industry: Entertainment
- Founded: 1998; 28 years ago
- Headquarters: Lima, Peru
- Website: www.cineplanet.com.pe

Cineplanet is a Peruvian movie theater chain owned by Intercorp. It is the largest domestic movie theater chain in Peru.

== History ==
The chain originally started as Cineplex in 1998. The first multiplex cinema opened in the Plaza San Miguel shopping center in the San Miguel district of Lima. In 1999, Intercorp (through its subsidiary Nexus Group) acquired Cineplex. Two more locations were opened in 2000.

In 2002, the company expanded is presence outside of Lima by opening a location in the city of Arequipa, in the south of the country, and a year later, in the city of Piura located on the north coast. In May 2005, as part of its regional expansion strategy, Cineplex S.A. entered the Chilean market under the Movieland brand. It built locations the cities of Santiago, Valdivia, and Temuco. In 2012, the company was renamed as Cineplanet, unifying both brands between both countries.
