= Technological University of Peru =

University in Peru

- Universidad Tecnológica del Perú
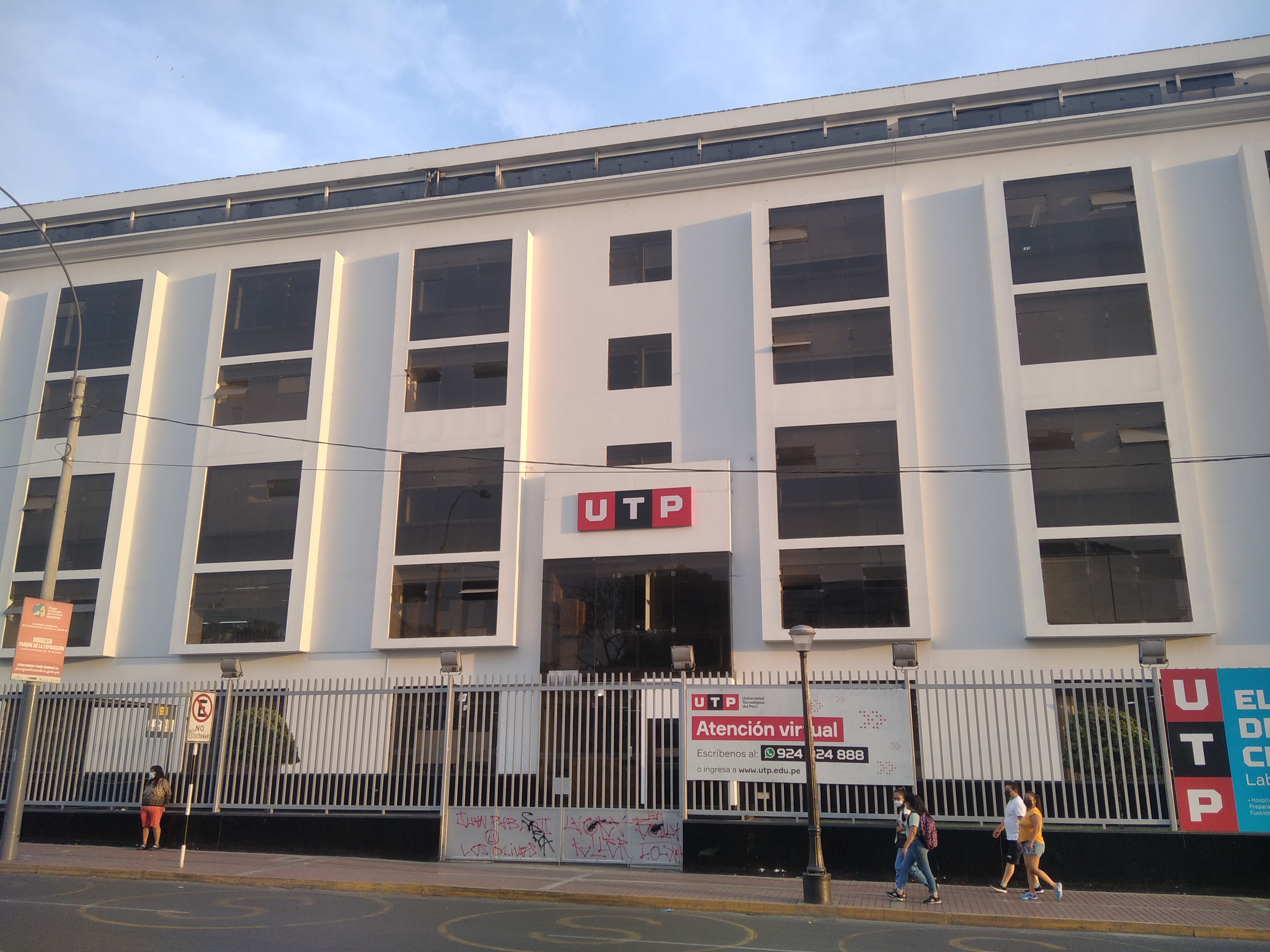
- Motto: En la UTP todo es posible
- Motto in English: At the UTP all is possible
- Established: September 8, 1997
- Founders: Roger Amuruz
- Parent institution: Intercorp
- Rector: Jonathan Golergant Niego
- Students: 156,000+ (2022)
- Location: Av. Petit Thouars 116, Lima, Peru
- Colours: Maroon White Black (Sports)
- Website: www.utp.edu.pe

The Technological University of Peru (Spanish: Universidad Tecnológica del Perú) is a private university in Lima, Peru. It has five offices in the city of Lima, located in the districts of Ate, Los Olivos, Lima, San Juan de Lurigancho and Villa El Salvador. At the national level, it has subsidiaries in Nuevo Chimbote, Arequipa, Chiclayo, Huancayo, Ica, Piura and Trujillo.

== History ==
The UTP was founded on September 8, 1997, by Roger Amuruz Gallegos and began its operation in November of the same year when the National Council for Authorization and Operation of Universities (CONAFU) provisionally authorized its operation.

In July 2012, the university was acquired by the Intercorp group, which entered into a purchase and sale contract with the IDAT Group of the shares of the UTP and the Private University of Chiclayo (UPCH), which made it the majority shareholder of both study centers. The business group acquired 72,874,213 shares of the existing 145,748,424 shares.

On June 13, 2019, after 1 year of evaluations, the National Superintendency of Higher University Education (SUNEDU) granted institutional licensing to the university after verifying that it complied with the Basic Quality Conditions established in the University Law. The license is valid for six years. According to Sunedu, UTP chose to abandon five undergraduate programs and four postgraduate programs (three master's degrees and one doctorate). Additionally, it increased the percentage of full-time teachers from 4% to 26.6%. They indicated that they also increased their research budget to S/. 5.7 million in 2019.

== See also ==
- Intercorp
