= Intercorp =

Peruvian conglomerate

Intercorp Perú Ltd.

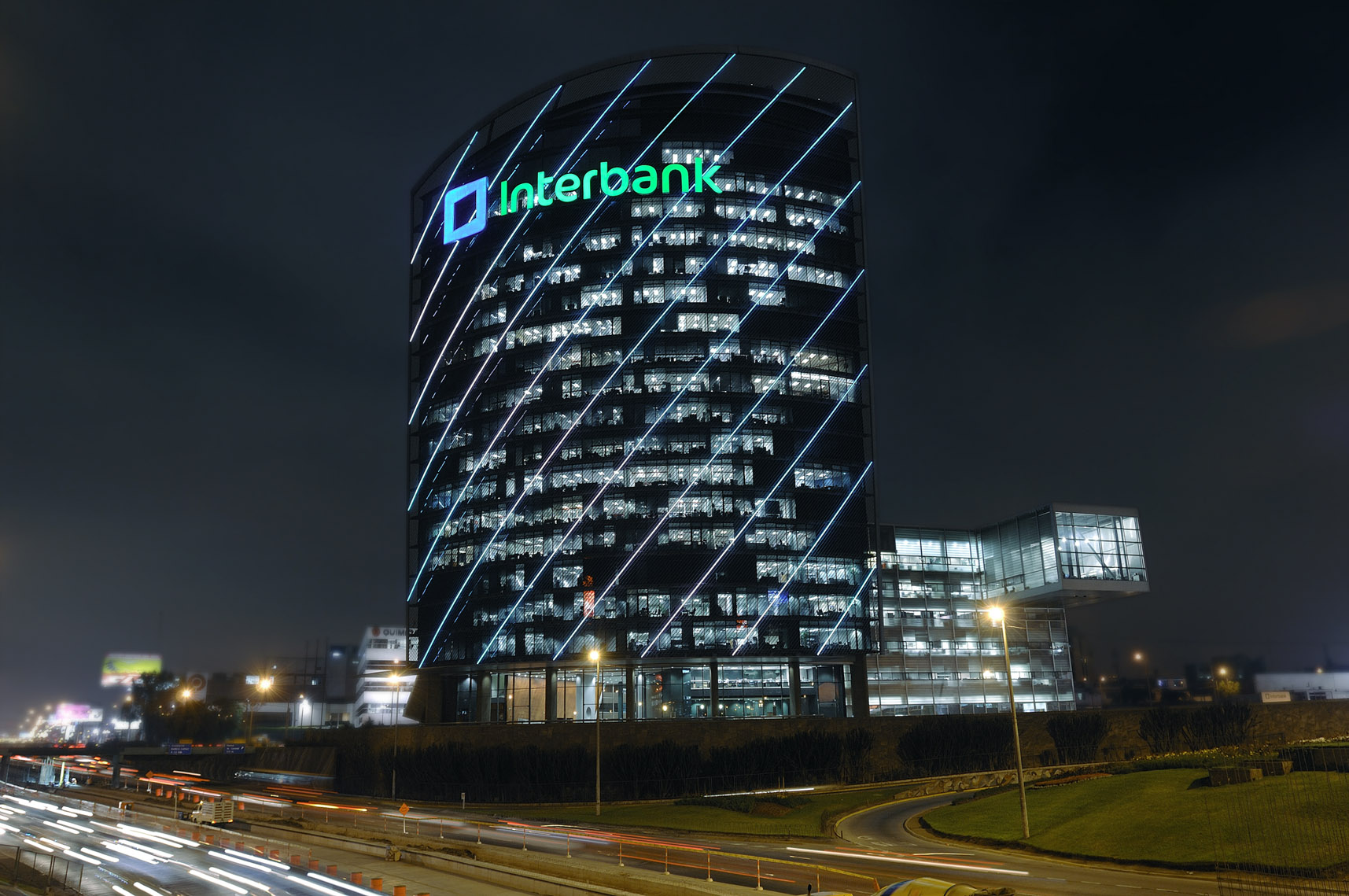
- Edificio Interbank in La Victoria District, Lima
- Formerly: IFH Peru Ltd.
- Type: Private
- Founded: 1994; 32 years ago
- Headquarters: Lima, Peru
- Areas served: Peru; Chile; China; Ecuador; Mexico; Panama
- Key people: Carlos Rodríguez-Pastor (chairman); Anne Marie See Pastor (director)
- Revenue: ▲ S/ 10.22 billion PEN (2023)
- Net income: ▼ S/ 1.63 billion PEN (2023)
- Total assets: ▲ S/ 118.95 billion PEN (2023)
- Owners: Bank of New York - ADR Programs (39.8%); International Financial Holdings Inc. (29.5%); Shetland Securities Inc. (16.4%); Southern Hill Corp. (11.4%); Others (2.9%)
- Subsidiaries: Intercorp Financial Services; Intercorp Retail
- Website: intercorp.com.pe/en

Intercorp Perú Ltd. is a Peruvian business conglomerate and multinational corporation chaired by Carlos Rodríguez-Pastor. Founded in 1994, it owns numerous well-known brands across different sectors of the Peruvian market. Intercorp primarily operates through two holding companies: Intercorp Financial Services and Intercorp Retail. Its headquarters are in the same building as its subsidiary Interbank, in Santa Catalina, Lima.

== History ==
The company dates back to 1994, when businessman Carlos Rodríguez-Pastor Mendoza bought the Banco Internacional del Perú (Interbanc before 1997), then owned by the Peruvian State. After his death a year later, his son, Carlos Rodríguez-Pastor, acquired the bank, creating the conglomerate. The first entity it created was the real estate company Urbi Propiedades, later renamed Interproperties.

In 2022, the company expressed its interest in acquiring the Banco del Pacífico, one of the main banks in Ecuador.

In 2025, Intercorp acquired the former Química Suiza building, located immediately behind its building. The building, dating back to the 1960s, was meant to be demolished and replaced by the Torre Abril, a planned residential skyscraper to be built by the construction company of the same name as the city's tallest building, with 45 floors and a height of over 150 metres (490 ft), and a total of around 1,750 apartments.

In February 2025, the Real Plaza Trujillo roof collapse occurred, resulting in 8 dead and at least 84 injured. Following investigations, Intercorp, the owner of the shopping center, was fined millions of soles for not complying with security standards.

== Subsidiaries ==
The company owns a number of subsidiaries in different sectors of the Peruvian market, including:

- Retail: Supermercados Peruanos (plazaVea, Vivanda, Mass and Makro Perú), Promart Homecenter, Oechsle, Real Plaza, Agora, Shopstar, JOKR, Inkafarma, Mifarma.
- Healthcare: Clínica Aviva, Química Suiza, Quicorp; Farmacias Peruanas and Droguería Inretail Pharma.
- Financial: Interbank, Express Net, Inteligo SAB, Interfondos SAF, Inteligo Bank LTD, Interseguro, Intertitulos, Financiera Oh!, Tebca, Izipay.
- Education: Technological University of Peru, Innova Schools, IDAT, Zegel Ipae, Escuela Corriente Alterna, Centro de la Imagen, Colectivo23.
- Restaurants: Bembos, Papa John's, Chinawok, Wang & Hnos, Dunkin' Donuts, Don Belisario, Popeyes, Servicios Compartidos de Restaurantes.
- Entertainment: Cineplanet, La Tinka, Olimpo Bet, Betsoffice
- Hotels: Casa Andina, Urbi Propiedades, Domus

== See also ==
- Edificio Interbank
- Intergroup Financial Services
