= Banco de Comercio =

Peruvian bank

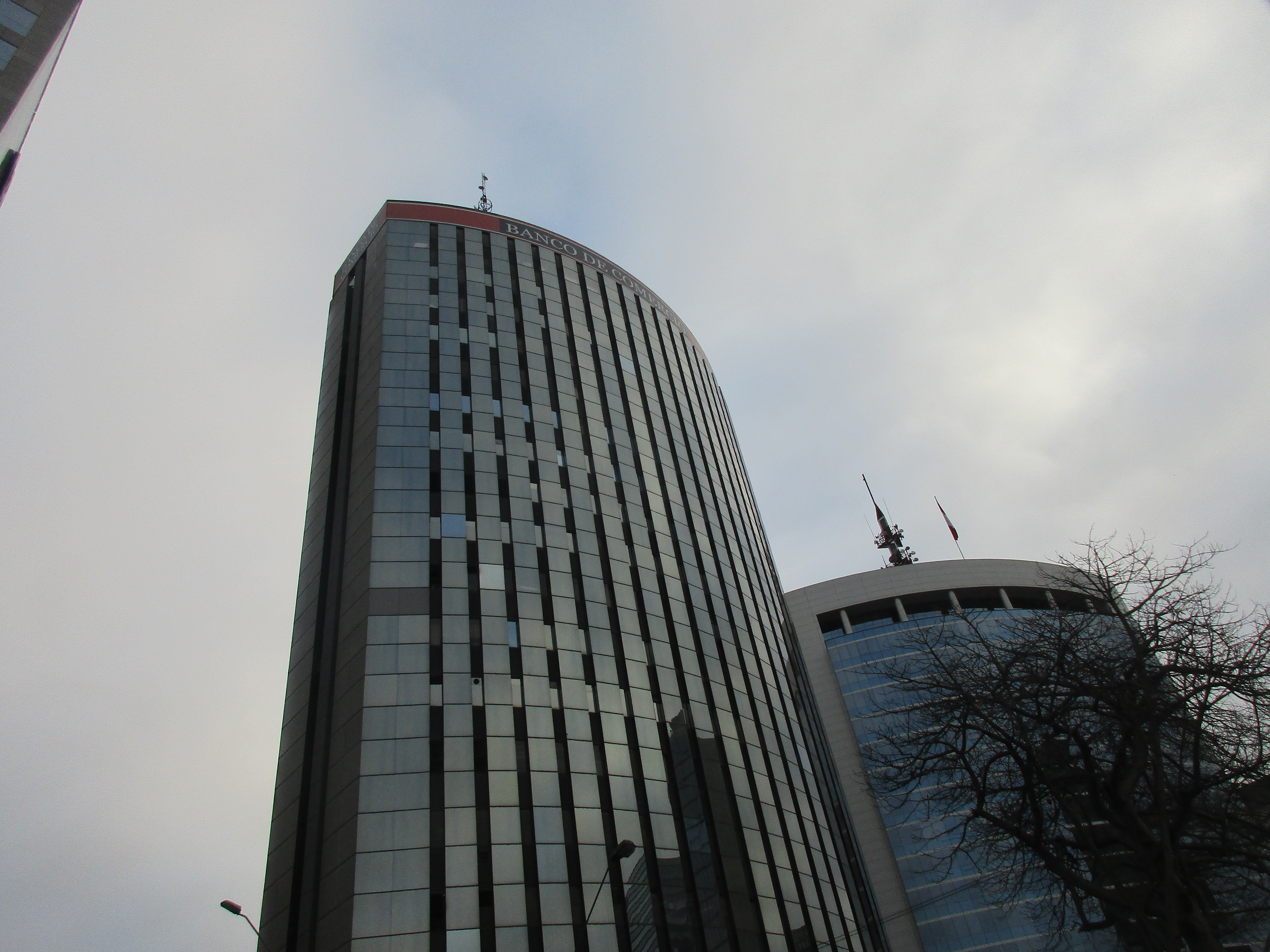
- Company type: Public
- Industry: Financial services
- Founded: August 2004; 21 years ago in Lima, Peru
- Headquarters: San Isidro District, Lima, Peru
- Area served: Peru
- Services: Banking services
- Website: www.bancom.pe

Bancom, known as the Banco de Comercio until 2023, is a Peruvian bank based in Lima.

== History ==
The bank's predecessor, the Banco Peruano de la Construcción (BANPECO), was established in 1967 and reorganised as the Banco de Comercio by 2004, as part of the restructuring process of the bank of the same name that had been accused of complying with corruption during the 1990s. This process was authorised by the SBS in August 2004.

In November 2004, the bank increased its share capital to S/. 51,894,500, by converting debentures consisting of 500 subordinated bonds into shares. which was later approved by the SBS in December 2004 and January 2005, then was raised to public deed in February 2005. Since that decade, the main shareholder of the bank is the Caja de Pensiones Militar Policial (CPMP), whose prominent clients are the National Police of Peru and the Peruvian Armed Forces.
