= Interbank =

Peruvian provider of financial services

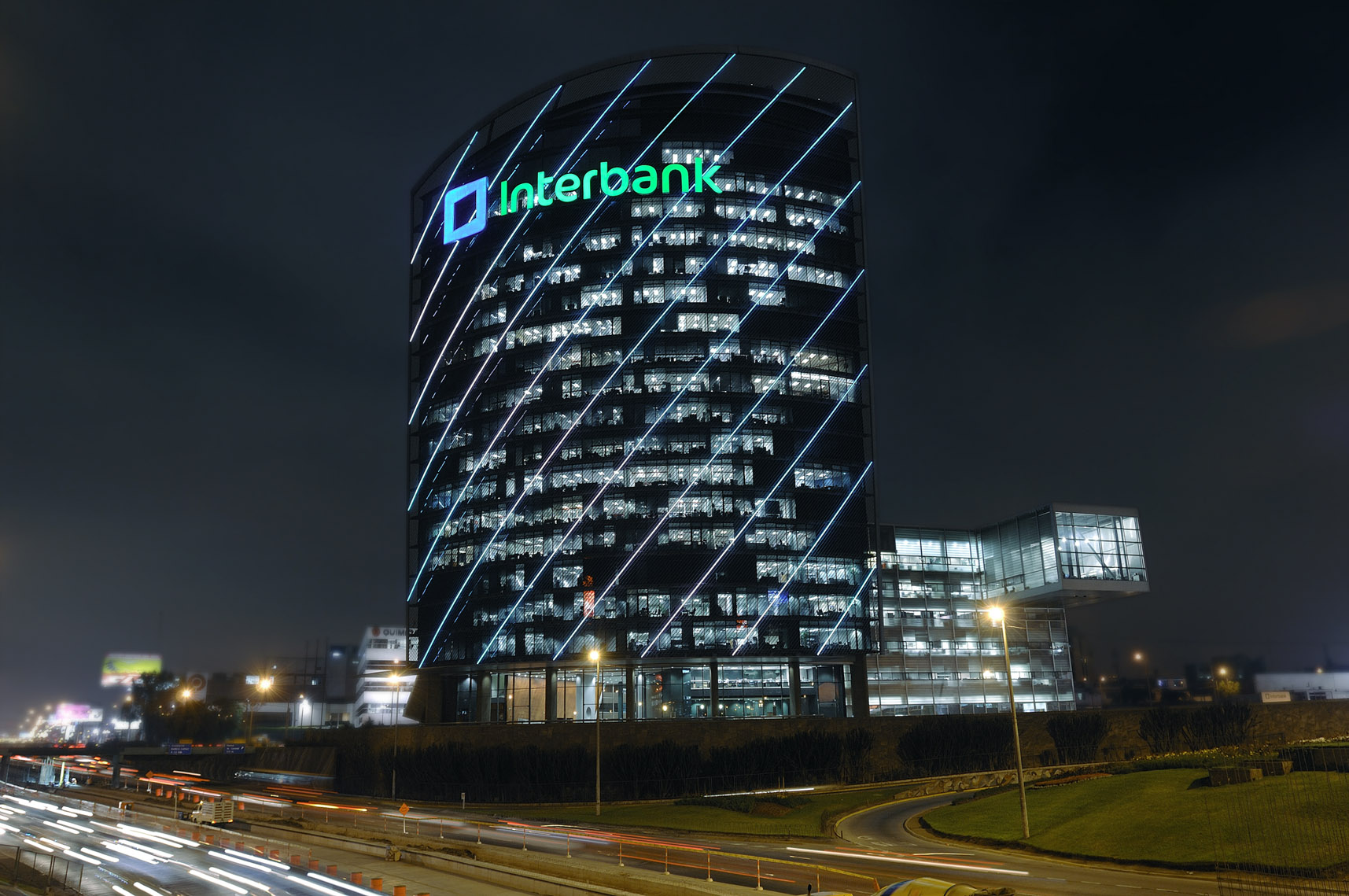
- Headquarters in Lima.
- Company type: Public
- Traded as: BVL: INTERBC1
- Industry: Financial services
- Founded: Lima, Peru, 1897
- Headquarters: Peru
- Key people: Carlos Rodríguez-Pastor, chairman
- Revenue: ▲ S/ 5.95 billion (2023)
- Net income: ▼ S/ 900 million (2023)
- Total assets: ▲ S/ 67.9 billion (2023)
- Owner: Intercorp Financial Services (99.3%)
- Number of employees: 6,266 (2023)
- Parent: Intercorp
- Website: http://www.interbank.pe/

Interbank, formally the Banco Internacional del Perú Service Holding S.A.A., is a Peruvian provider of financial services.

== History ==
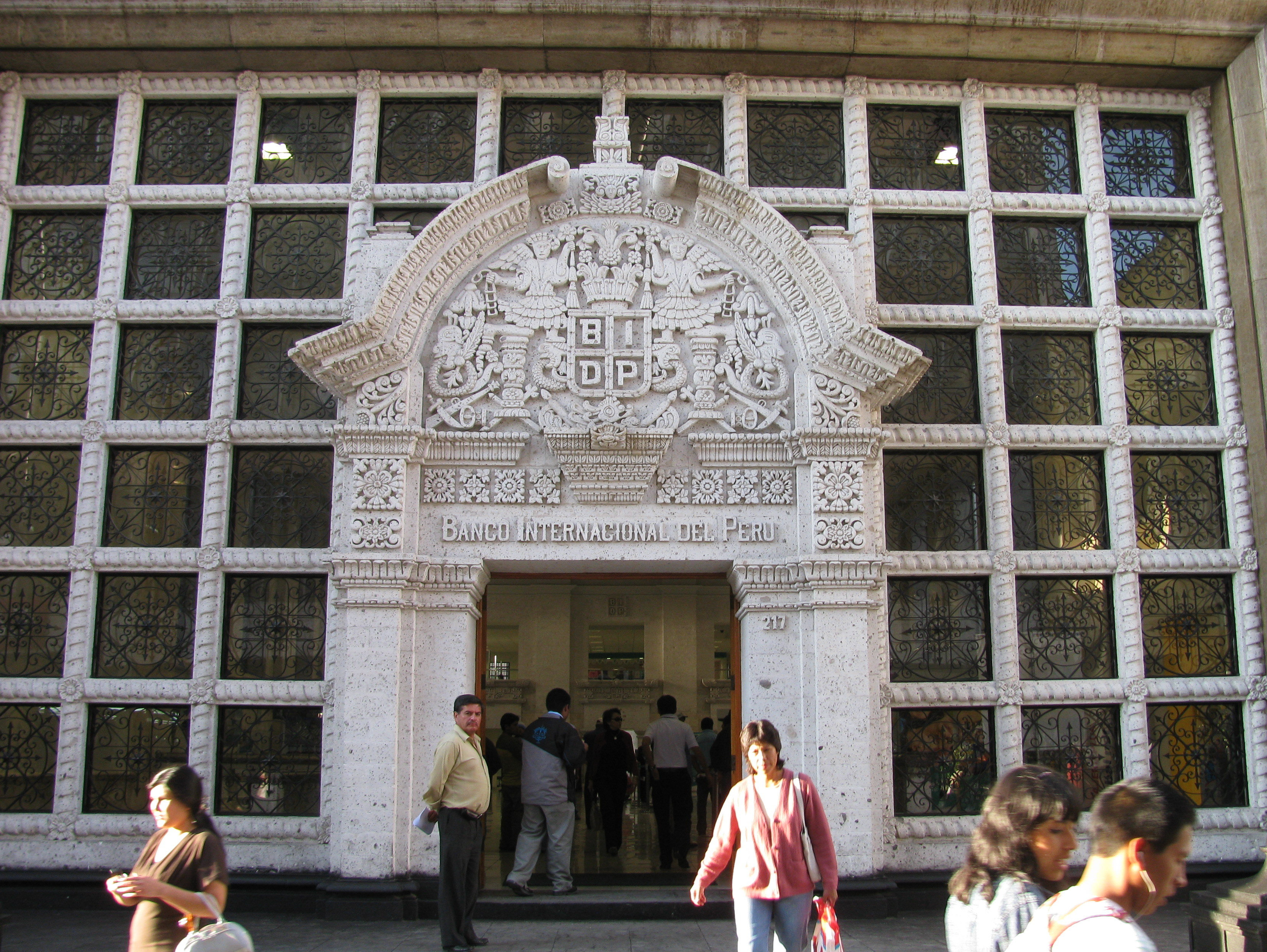
Interbank office in Arequipa

In 1897, Elias Mujica opened an agency at the Jirón de la Unión in Lima's historic centre under the name of Banco Internacional. In 1934, branches were opened in Chiclayo and Arequipa, and later expansions included Piura, Sullana and other places in Peru.

Under the military government of Juan Velasco Alvarado, in 1970, the national bank (Banco de la Nación) purchased Banco Internacional and changed its name to Banca Asociada del País. Ten years later, under the democratic government of Fernando Belaunde Terry, the bank changed its name to InterBanc but it was still property of the Peruvian government.

In July 1994, Carlos Rodríguez-Pastor Sr. along with several North American businessmen purchased 91% of the bank's stocks. The new owners changed the name to Interbank.

Part of the expansion strategy at that point was to open agency branches in supermarkets so customers could shop and bank at the same time.

In 2004, Interbank bought the supermarket chain Supermercados Santa Isabel from the transnational Ahold, and they founded Supermercados Peruanos. They have offices inside Vivanda and Plaza Vea stores. Currently, Interbank has 230 branches, called "tiendas" or stores, over 1,500 ATMs, and over 1,500 Interbank Agentes in Peru.

In 2007, Interbank opened a business agency in Shanghai, China in order to facilitate negotiations between Chinese and Peruvians.

Luis Felipe Castellanos López-Torres holds the position of General Manager (CEO) since 2011.

== Services ==
Interbank provides ATM services under the GlobalNet brand which accept debit and credit cards from around the world, as well as permitting cash deposits. Interbank also provides change machines which exchange notes for coins.

The bank has a corporate university belonging to the Intercorp Group called Interbank Corporate University, known as UCIC. This organization provides training services to the more than 20,000 employees of the Intercorp Group companies.

Utility bills can be paid at Interbank branches.

== See also ==
- Supermercados Peruanos
- Cineplanet
- GlobalNet
