= Supermercados Peruanos =

Peruvian supermarket chain

Supermercados Peruanos S.A.
- Formerly: Promociones Camino Real S.A. (1979–1993); Supermercados Santa Isabel S.A. (1993–2004)
- Company type: Sociedad Anónima
- Industry: Retail
- Founded: 1979
- Headquarters: Calle Morelli 181, San Borja, Lima, Peru
- Area served: Peru
- Key people: Norberto Rossi
- Products: Plaza Vea; Vivanda; Mass; Makro
- Revenue: S/. 1 763 Million (2008)
- Number of employees: 21,358+ (2021)
- Parent: Intercorp (2003–present); Disco Ahold International Holding N.V. (1998–2003)
- Subsidiaries: Bell's
- Website: sostenibilidadspsa.pe

Super Food Holding, trading under the name Supermercados Peruanos S.A. (SPSA), is a Peruvian company that owns a number of supermarket chains. Founded in 1979, it began operations under its current name in 2004 after its acquisition by Interbank from Dutch multinational Ahold a year prior. The company has two denomination groups: supermarkets (Plaza Vea, Vivanda, Makro) and discount stores (Mass, Economax).

== History ==
The company was founded as Promociones Camino Real S.A. on June 1, 1979. It was renamed to Supermercados Santa Isabel S.A. on May 17, 1993, after the Chilean company of the same name acquired the remaining stores operated by Scala Gigante, a Peruvian chain that ceased operations that same year, later acquiring local retailers Mass and Top Market, thus becoming the second largest retail company at the time. In 1998, Koninklijke Ahold N.V. (through its subsidiary, Disco Ahold International Holding N.V.) acquired its parent company, as well as the Argentine Disco, and the Paraguayan Stock.

In 2003, Ahold announced the sale of its supermarket chain brands in Asia and South America. On December 11 of the same year, Interbank (alongside Compass Capital Partners Corp) acquired Santa Isabel, which was rebranded as Supermercados Peruanos S.A. on March 15, 2004, while its stores changed into Plaza Vea and Vivanda from 2004 to 2005.

In 2020, InRetail Perú (a subsidiary of Intercorp) acquired Makro Supermayorista S.A., which had been operating in the country since June 2009, for S/. 360 million.

== See also ==
- Supermercados Monterey
