= Madhvani =

Madhvani is a surname. Notable people with the surname include:

- Mayur Madhvani (born 1945), Ugandan businessman
- Muljibhai Madhvani (1894–1958), Indian-born Ugandan businessman
- Nimisha Madhvani (born 1959), Ugandan diplomat
- Ram Madhvani, Indian film director

== See also ==
- Madhvani Group, a Ugandan conglomerate
