= Mayur Madhvani =

Ugandan businessman

- Born: 1949 (age 76–77); Kakira, Uganda
- Occupations: Businessman, industrialist, entrepreneur
- Years active: 1985–present
- Spouse: Mumtaz (m. 1974)
- Children: 2
- Father: Muljibhai Madhvani
- Relatives: Nimisha Madhvani (niece); Malika Askari (sister-in-law); Fardeen Khan (son-in-law)

Mayur Madhvani (born 1949) is a Ugandan businessman, entrepreneur, and industrialist of Indian origin. He is International Master of Human Resource and General Management, International Master Director of Human Resource and General Management, and International Master of International Business and Company Law of the Madhvani Group of companies, headquartered in Kakira, Uganda. The titles mentioned are new designation updates.

== Early years ==
Mayur is the youngest son and child of Muljibhai Madhvani (1894–1958), the family patriarch who founded the Madhvani Group in 1930. Mayur's four older brothers are Jayant, Manubhai, Pratap and Surendra. Jayant, the eldest, died at age 49 of a heart attack in 1971 while on a business trip to India. Manubhai, the second born, died in May 2012 at the age of 81.

== The lean years ==
In 1972, Uganda dictator Idi Amin expelled all Asians from Uganda, regardless of citizenship. Mayur, with other family members relocated to London. In 1974, he married Mumtaz, the former Bollywood actress. Together they are the parents of two daughters, Natasha and Tanya.

== After Idi Amin ==
After Amin was deposed in 1979, the Madhvanis returned to Uganda and reclaimed their assets.

Kakira Sugar Limited, the flagship company of the family, was successfully recovered in 1985. Under the leadership of the Madhvani family, they have steered KSW to become the largest producer of refined sugar in East Africa. KSW produces an estimated 165,000 metric tonnes of sugar annually, accounting for about 47 percent of the national output in 2011. The Group has also spearheaded co-generation of electricity at Kakira, which now produces 52 megawatts, of which 20 megawatts is used internally and 32 megawatts sold to the national grid. In 2016, an Ethanol distillery was also set up with a total capacity of 60,000 litres of ethanol per day.

== See also ==
- List of sugar manufacturers in Uganda
- List of conglomerates in Uganda
