= Gaius Calpetanus Rantius Quirinalis Valerius Festus =

1st-century AD Roman senator and general

Gaius Calpetanus Rantius Quirinalis Valerius Festus was a Roman senator, general, and amicus to each of the Flavian emperors. He proved his value to the Flavians when, as legatus legionis, or commander, of Legio III Augusta stationed in Africa, he assassinated the proconsul, who favored a rival of Vespasian during the Year of Four Emperors. He maintained his loyalty through the reigns of his sons Titus and Domitian, but fell out of favor during the latter's reign and was forced to commit suicide.

Tacitus describes him in AD 70 as "a young man of extravagant habits and immoderate ambition".

== Origins ==
Festus' polyonymous name suggests he either was adopted or used part of his maternal grandfather's name in his. Olli Salomies has argued that the name given to him at birth was Valerius Festus, and he was adopted by Gaius Calpetanus Rantius Sedatus, suffect consul for the nundinium of March to April 47. Festus' family had their origins in Arretium, where a number of Valerii Festi have been attested, and these like him are members of the Roman tribe Pomptina.

== Career ==
His career is documented in a fragmentary honorary inscription found at Tergeste. He started his career in his teens as a member of the quattuorviri viarum curandarum, one of the four boards that make up the vigintiviri. This was followed by a term as military tribune in Legio VI Victrix. Next came the office of quaestor, followed by serving as sevir equitum Romanorum at the annual review of the equites, then the magistracies of plebeian tribune and praetor. Following his praetorship, Festus was co-opted into the priesthood of the Sodales Augustales. At this point Nero appointed him legatus of Legio III Augusta in Numidia, which was adjacent to the proconsular province of Roman Africa.

It was here Festus found himself in the civil war of the Year of the Four Emperors. According to Tacitus, initially Roman Africa declared for Vitellius, because he had been proconsul there not long before. At first Valerius Festus also sided with Vitellius, but soon Festus began to secretly negotiate with Vespasian, intending to hold with the man who succeeded.

Festus' opportunity to act came in the early months of the year 70. Despite the defeat and murder of Vitellius, the proconsul of Africa, Lucius Calpurnius Piso, still embraced his cause. When messengers with conflicting messages arrived in Carthage, Piso's response only increased uncertainty in the capital of the proconsular province, and, unable to control events, Piso shut himself up in the palace. When news of these events reached Festus, he sent some cavalry to Carthage, who slew Piso. Festus, who had been waiting at Adrumetum to learn the outcome of events in Carthage, then proceeded to the camp of Legio III Augusta and took control of the unit. He had the prefect of the camp, Cetronius Pisanus, put in irons, claiming the man was an accomplice of Piso. Then Festus made several changes in personnel and used the legion to settle a long-simmering feud between Oenes and the Leptitani, thus demonstrating he was in control of the province. Valerius Festus began to "punish and reward", as Tacitus puts it, and drove out the Garamantes, who had been called to help by the numerically weaker Oeae in the dispute between the inhabitants of Oea and Leptis Magna . In the year 70 AD, when fighting the Garamantes, he did a famous expedition to sub-Saharan Africa probably reaching what is now Nigeria, according to historians Susan Ravel and Fage.

With this, he openly declared for Vespasian. In return, Vespasian soon appointed Festus to a suffect consulship for the nundinium of May–June 71 as the colleague of the Caesar Domitian. and awarded him dona militaria or military decorations. Not long afterwards Festus became curator alvei Tiberis, and was admitted to the next priestly rank, pontiff. Then Festus was appointed governor of two important provinces in succession: first Pannonia (73-77), then Hispania Tarraconensis (78-81).

Brian W. Jones believes Festus may have been appointed proconsul of Asia during the short reign of Titus, although Werner Eck does not include his name in his list of proconsuls of this period.

=== Festus expedition to the Niger River area ===
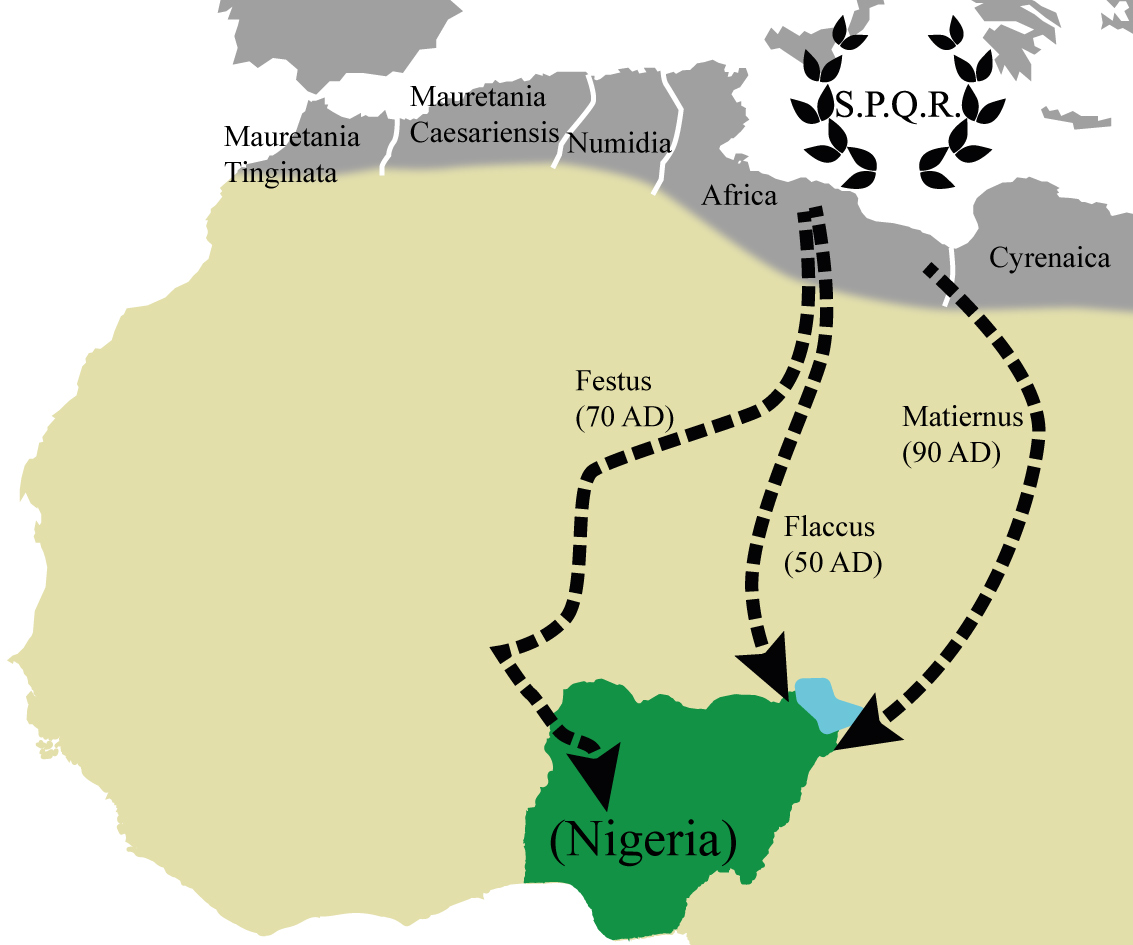
Roman exploration of Nigeria

Some historians (like Susan Raven) believe that there was even a Roman expedition to sub-Saharan central Africa: the one of Valerius Festus, that could have reached the equatorial Africa thanks to the Niger River.

Indeed Pliny wrote that in 70 AD a legatus legionis, or commander, of the Legio III Augusta named Festus repeated the Balbus expedition toward the Niger River. Festus went to the eastern Hoggar Mountains and penetrated the Air Mountains as far as the Gadoufaoua plain. Gadoufaoua (Touareg for “the place where camels fear to go”) is a site in the Tenere desert of Niger known for its extensive fossil graveyard, where remains of Sarcosuchus imperator, popularly known as SuperCroc, have been found).

Festus finally arrived in the area in which Timbuktu is now located. Some academics, such as Fage, think that he only reached the Ghat region in southern Libya, near the libyan border with southern Algeria and Niger. However, it is possible that a few of his legionaries reached as far as the Niger River and went down to the equatorial forests navigating the river to the estuary in what is now Nigeria. Something similar may have occurred in the exploration of the Nile done under Emperor Nero.

== See also ==
- Romans in sub-Saharan Africa

Political offices
Preceded by Domitian, and Gnaeus Pedius Cascus as Suffect consuls	Suffect consul of the Roman Empire; 71 with Domitian	Succeeded by Lucius Flavius Fimbria, and Gaius Atilius Barbarus as Suffect consuls
