= Kakira Thermal Power Station =

Thermal power station in Uganda

Kakira Power Station
- Country: Uganda
- Location: Kakira, Jinja District
- Coordinates: 00°30′32″N 33°17′24″E
- Status: Operational
- Commission date: 2007
- Owner: Kakira Power Company

Thermal power station
- Primary fuel: Bagasse
- Cogeneration?: Yes

Power generation
- Units operational: 2 x 4 MW; 2 x 6 MW; 2 x 16 MW
- Nameplate capacity: 52 MW

Kakira Power Station is a 52 megawatt bagasse-fired thermal power plant in the town of Kakira in Jinja District in the Eastern Region of Uganda.

== Location ==
The power station is located on the Madhvani Estate, adjacent to Kakira Sugar Works, the flagship of the business conglomerate. This location is approximately 16 kilometres (9.9 mi), by road, northeast of Jinja, the largest city in the sub-region.

== Overview ==
The power station is owned and operated by Kakira Energy Company, a subsidiary of the Madhvani Group. The station is designed and built around the sugar manufacturing plant of Kakira Sugar Works (KSW), the flagship company of the group. The fibrous residue from the process of crushing sugar cane, known as bagasse, is burnt to heat water in boilers and produce steam. The steam is pressurized and used to drive turbines, which then generate electricity. The excess heat is used in the sugar manufacturing process. The power station is capable of producing 52 megawatts of power at maximum capacity.

About 16 megawatts (31 percent) of the power generated is used by the factories and businesses of the group located on their 9,500 hectares (37 mi^{2}) business estate at Kakira. The other 36 megawatts (69 percent) of the power generated, is sold to Uganda's national electricity grid. The power station has been operational since 2005, originally with a 6 megawatt generator. In 2006, a new additional 16 megawatt generator was installed and went online in 2007. More equipment added between 2011 and 2013 increased the capacity to 52 megawatts.

== Recent developments ==
The New Vision newspaper, Uganda's English daily, reported in July 2012 that KSW would increase the electricity output at the power station from 22 megawatts to 52 megawatts by June 2013. That same information was repeated in February 2013, in the Daily Monitor, another Ugandan daily publication. It is expected that 20 megawatts (38.5 percent) of the power generated will be used internally and the remaining 32 megawatts (61.5 percent) will be sold to the national grid.

As of November 2013, KSW was in the middle of a US$75 million (about UGX:191 billion) upgrade and expansion. US$30 million (about UGX:76 billion) will be raised through a 10-year corporate bond on the Uganda Securities Exchange and the rest will be sourced from local banks. When the upgrade was completed in 2017, the cogeneration capacity of the power station was increased from 22 megawatt to 52 megawatts.

In October 2014, the station was granted an electricity production license for 20 megawatts by the Electricity Regulatory Authority. It means that, of the 52 megawatt produced by the power station, 32 megawatts is used internally and 20 megawatts is sold into the national electric grid.

== See also ==
- Muljibhai Madhvani
- List of power stations in Uganda
