= Nimisha Madhvani =

Ugandan diplomat

Nimisha Jayant Madhvani
- Born: 1959 (age 66–67); Kakira, Uganda
- Citizenship: Uganda
- Occupations: Diplomat and Entrepreneur
- Years active: 1986 — Present
- Title: Uganda's Ambassador to the Nordic countries (recalled)
- Spouse: divorced
- Relatives: Muljibhai Madhvani (grandfather); Mayur Madhvani (uncle)

Nimisha Jayant Madhvani is a Ugandan diplomat, she currently serves as Uganda's Ambassador to the United Kingdom. Formerly she was the ambassador of Uganda to the Nordic countries she was accredited to Denmark, Finland, Iceland, Norway and Sweden.

Prior to that, she served as Uganda's Ambassador to United Arab Emirates, and the International Renewable Energy Agency (IRENA).

Before that, she was Uganda's ambassador to France, Spain, Portugal and UNESCO, based in Paris.

== Background and education ==
She was born in Uganda in 1959 to Meena Madhvani and Jayant Madhvani, both Ugandan citizens of Indian descent. Jayant was the firstborn of the five sons of Mulji Prabhudas Madhvani (1894–1958), the industrialist, entrepreneur who founded the Madhvani Group of Companies in 1930. Nimisha grew up at the family estate in Kakira, about an hour and one half's drive east of the capital, Kampala. When dictator Idi Amin expelled Ugandan Asians in 1972, she located to the United Kingdom with her family, when she was 13 years old.

== Diplomatic career ==
When the current National Resistance Movement captured power in the 1980s, the Madhvani family returned to Uganda and repossessed their assets. In the 1990s Nimisha joined the Uganda foreign service, first being posted to Washington, D.C., as first secretary to the Ugandan embassy there. In 2007, she was transferred to the Ugandan High Commission in India, based in New Delhi, as the second-in-command. One year later, she was appointed substantive High Commissioner, serving in that capacity from April 2008. While there, she was concurrently accredited to Bangladesh, Bhutan, Indonesia, Malaysia, Myanmar, Singapore, Sri Lanka and Thailand.

In the summer of 2014 Nimisha was transferred to the Ugandan embassy in Paris, France, as the Ambassador, serving in that capacity until 2017. While there, she also served as her country's ambassador to Portugal, Spain, BIE, OECD and UNESCO. In January 2017 she was posted to Abu Dhabi as Uganda's ambassador but was later recalled for causing a diplomatic incident between the UAE and Ugandan governments. She was replaced in Paris by Richard Nduhura, who previously was Uganda's permanent representative to the United Nations headquarters in New York City. In November 2018, she posted to Uganda's Embassy Copenhagen, accredited to the Nordic countries, replacing Ambassador Kibedi Zaake Wanume, who was posted to Abu Dhabi, in the United Arab Emirates. In 2020 she was recalled to Kampala after leaked audio emerged of Nimisha Madhvani conspiring with her embassy colleagues to steal and distribute funds allocated to aid displaced Ugandans affected by the COVID-19 global pandemic.
