= Sukulu mine =

Niobium mine in Eastern, Uganda

- Interactive map of Sukulu mine
- Location: Eastern Region, Uganda; 0.6678°N 34.1654°E
- Products: Niobium

The Sukulu mine is a large mining and mineral processing complex located in Osukuru County, Tororo District, in the Eastern Region of Uganda. It is one of the country's most important mineral resources sites, known for its niobium, phosphate, and iron ore deposits, and is central to industrial development plans that include a phosphate fertilizer plant and downstream processing facilities.

Sukulu represents one of the largest niobium reserves in Uganda having estimated reserves of 230 million tonnes of ore grading 0.2% niobium metal. The complex also contains deposits of phosphorus and iron, and a phosphate fertilizer plant has been established to utilize the phosphate rock resources.

Commercial phosphate processing at Sukulu started in the 1960s under the state-owned Tororo Industrial Chemicals and Fertilizers Limited (TICAF), producing single superphosphate (SSP) before closing in 1977 during Uganda’s economic and political disruption. In the 2010s, Uganda signed agreements for renewed development linked to a phosphate mine and fertiliser plant project in Tororo District.

== Location ==
Sukulu mine is in the Sukulu Hills, in and around Osukuru Sub-county and nearby areas of Tororo District, Eastern Region, Uganda. Studies of groundwater and geochemistry in the Sukulu phosphate-mineralised area report sampling locations in the Sukulu Hills region around 0.66–0.70°N and 34.14–34.19°E.

== Geology ==
The Sukulu deposit occurs within a carbonatite complex. A scoping study for the Sukulu phosphate project described the mineralised material as weathered and reworked residual (eluvial) soils enriched in phosphorus, iron, and niobium, with apatite and magnetite as major components and pyrochlore as a key niobium-bearing mineral.

== Resources and commodities ==
Reported commodities include phosphate rock (P2O5), niobium (often reported as Nb2O5 in pyrochlore-bearing soils), iron ore (magnetite), and additional minerals linked to rare earth elements and titanium.

=== Reported estimates ===
The figures below are compiled from published reports and should be treated as historical or indicative estimates unless updated by a current, publicly reported mineral resource statement.

Selected reported Sukulu resource estimates
| Commodity / material | Reported estimate | Grade / notes | Source |
|---|---|---|---|
| Phosphate rock (Sukulu deposit) | 230 million tonnes | 13% P_{2}O_{5} | USGS (2000 country report for Kenya & Uganda) |
| Pyrochlore (niobium-bearing) | 6 million tonnes | Reported as "pyrochlore" occurrence at Sukulu carbonatite deposit | USGS (2000 country report for Kenya & Uganda) |
| Pyrochlore-bearing soils (three valleys) | 202 million tons (of which 130 million tons cited as averaging 0.2% Nb_{2}O_{5}) | Fine particle size cited as a processing constraint | Nagudi (2011), as reproduced in an Uganda mineral resources report |
| Iron ore (Sukulu) | 45.7 million tonnes | Average grade 62% iron | USGS (2000 country report for Kenya & Uganda) |
| Rare earth elements (Sukulu) | 73.6 million tonnes | 0.32% La_{2}O_{5} (reported) | DGSM (Uganda) 2024 |
| Phosphates (Sukulu) | 230 million tonnes | 13.1% P_{2}O_{5} (reported) | DGSM (Uganda) 2024 |

References for the table:

== History ==
Uganda established Tororo Industrial Chemicals and Fertilizers Limited (TICAF) in 1962 to develop phosphate resources at Sukulu Hills and manufacture single superphosphate (SSP) for domestic use and export to Kenya and Tanzania. The World Bank report describes TICAF’s SSP plant capacity as 25,000 tons per year and its sulphuric acid plant capacity as 10,000 tons per year, with operations starting in 1964 and closing in 1977.

In December 2014, Uganda’s minerals minister told Reuters that the government had signed a deal with Guangzhou Dongsong Energy Group to develop a phosphate mine and fertiliser plant in Tororo District, linked to a wider investment package that included a steel plant, with total spending reported at at least US$620 million.

== Development and downstream processing ==
A scoping study prepared for the Sukulu phosphate project set out technical workstreams for mining and processing the Sukulu materials and recommended further work typical for project development, including additional testing and project definition. In 2023, Uganda’s Office of the Prime Minister reported a government inspection of Guangzhou Dongsong Energy (U) Ltd in Tororo to assess the status of the phosphate project and stated that the facility had not been producing at the time of the visit, with fertiliser output plans referenced in the report.

== Environmental and health considerations ==
Groundwater studies in the Sukulu phosphate-mineralised area have assessed naturally elevated fluoride levels and estimated associated health risks for local communities relying on groundwater sources, with fluoride exposure identified as a public health concern in the study area.

== See also ==
- Mining industry of Uganda
- Osukuru Industrial Complex
- Mining industry of Uganda
- Tororo District
