= Mining industry of Uganda =

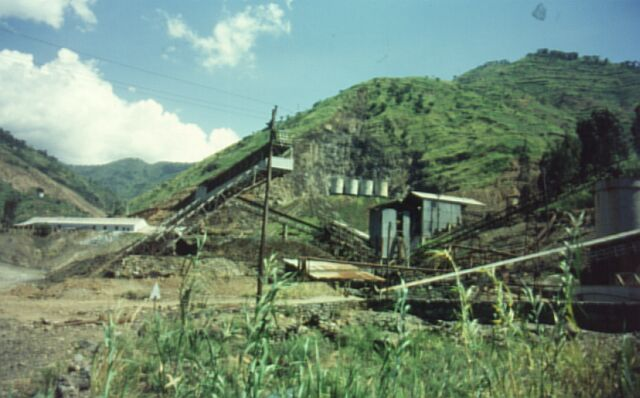
Kilembe Mines in southwest Uganda

The mining industry of Uganda, documented as early as the 1920s, witnessed a boom in the 1950s with a record 30 percent of the country's exports. It received a further boost when mining revenues increased by 48 percent between 1995 and 1997. However, the World Bank reported that the sector's contribution to gross domestic product (GDP) dropped from 6 percent during the 1970s to below 0.5 percent in 2010. Uganda's extractive industry activities have been identified by the Natural Resource Governance Institute as focused on "extraction of cobalt, gold, copper, iron ore, tungsten, steel, tin and other industrial products such as cement, diamonds, salt and vermiculite". Limestone is sold in local markets whereas gold, tin, and tungsten are major exports.

== History ==
The country's mining history is recorded in the 1920s with work done at southwest Uganda's tin and tungsten deposits. In the following decade, gold mining began near Busia. In the 1950s, the Kilembe copper mine was developed and it became the country's largest mine. The 1950s and 1960s was an important phase for mining when it had a 30 percent contribution to the total exports of the nation. During the late 1980s, laying of roads led to increase in demand for construction material. The National Mining Commission was formed in 1988. North Korea financed the Ugandan government's project to rehabilitate the Kilembe copper mine.

== Production and impacts ==
Companies working in the mining and quarrying industries saw an 11 percent increase in revenues every year (in 2008).

Under the SMMRP, artisanal mining is part of community development with 50 artisanal and small-scale mining associations getting established.

Lack of continuous power supply is one of the challenges that the industry faces.

Tororo and Hima Cement Industries together produce 1.05 million tonnes of cement annually. Despite this, as of 2013 Uganda imported cement from Kenya.

A-Tec Industries (Austria) restarted extraction at the Kilembe Copper Mines with an investment of US$200 million.

Magnus International Resources (US), Anglo Uganda Corp. (UK), and Grey Crown Resources Ltd. (Canada) are some of the foreign companies working for gold extraction in Uganda. Gold mining is also done by artisans. The first case of gold production was recorded in 1992, and, in 2000 Uganda, produced 56 kilograms (123 lb) of gold.

230 metric tonnes of phosphorus is estimated to be present in approximately 26 square kilometres (10 mi^{2}) of the Osukuru Hills.

Canada's IBI Corp. has explored Mubende for uranium.

Cresta Uganda is involved in diamond mining.

== Legal framework ==
The country has a Mineral Act, which is under revision. Mineral exploration and exploitation is governed by several types of licenses. These are: the Prospecting Licence which is mineral or area specific and is valid for one year; under Exclusive Prospecting Licence (EPL), mineral specific. and is limited to an area of 20.48 square kilometres (7.91 sq mi) and the Special Exclusive Prospecting Licence (SEPL) is for a minimum area of 76.8 square kilometres (29.7 sq mi); Mining License for developers which could be location specific as Mining License is limited to an area of 16 hectares (40 acres) with validity of 1 year; in the case of large mining area the lease could be for 21 years for areas up to 251 hectares (620 acres); and Mineral Dealers Licence which is a permit to use water resources for mining operations with validity of one year ending December.

Under the new Mineral Act, at least 70% of all revenue from new mines will belong to the government. From that amount, 15% will go to the local government and the town council will get a 10% of the revenue. Owner of the land shall receive up to 5%.

== Mines ==
- Kilembe Mines ( copper, cobalt)
- Nyamuliro mine (Tungsten)
- Ruhijha mine (Tungsten)
- Sukulu mine (Niobium)

== Bibliography ==
- Uganda Business Law Handbook: Strategic Information and Laws. Int'l Business Publications. 2012. ISBN 978-1-4387-7128-1.
- Job, A. L. (1967). "Mining in Uganda". Uganda Journal. 31 (1): 43–61.
- Hinton, Jennifer (2009). "National Strategy for the Advancement of Artisanal and Small Scale Mining in Uganda". Report to Ministry of Energy and Mineral Development.
- Kasimbazi, Emmanuel; Alexander, Kibandama (2011). Environmental Law in Uganda. Kluwer Law International. ISBN 978-90-411-3833-0.
