= Romans in sub-Saharan Africa =

Ancient Roman expeditions into Africa

Ancient Roman expeditions into Africa
- Romans in sub-Saharan Africa
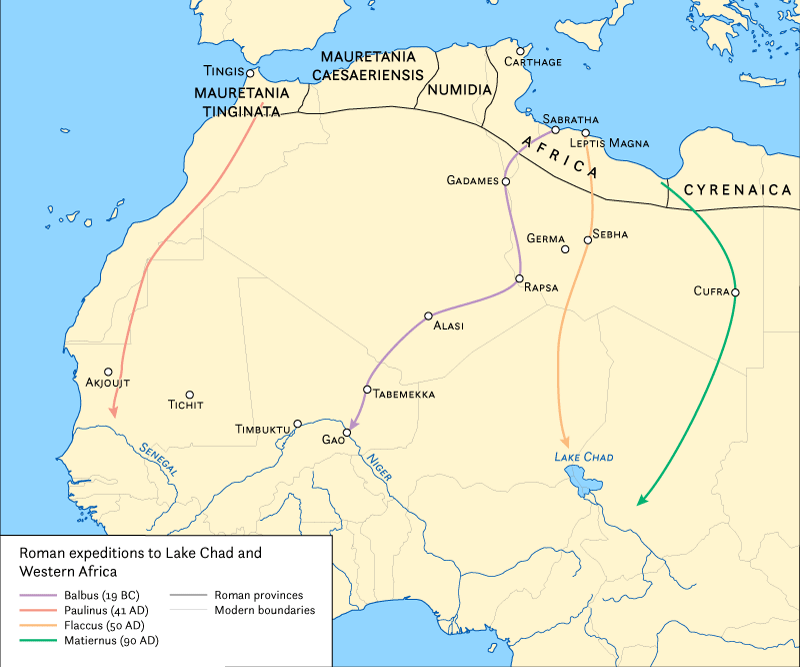
- Roman expeditions to sub-Saharan Africa west of the Nile River
- Operational scope: Establishing direct and secure trade routes to access valuable goods such as gold, animals, slaves, spices and other resources from Africa and expanding Roman territorial claims.
- Date: 1st century BC – 1st century

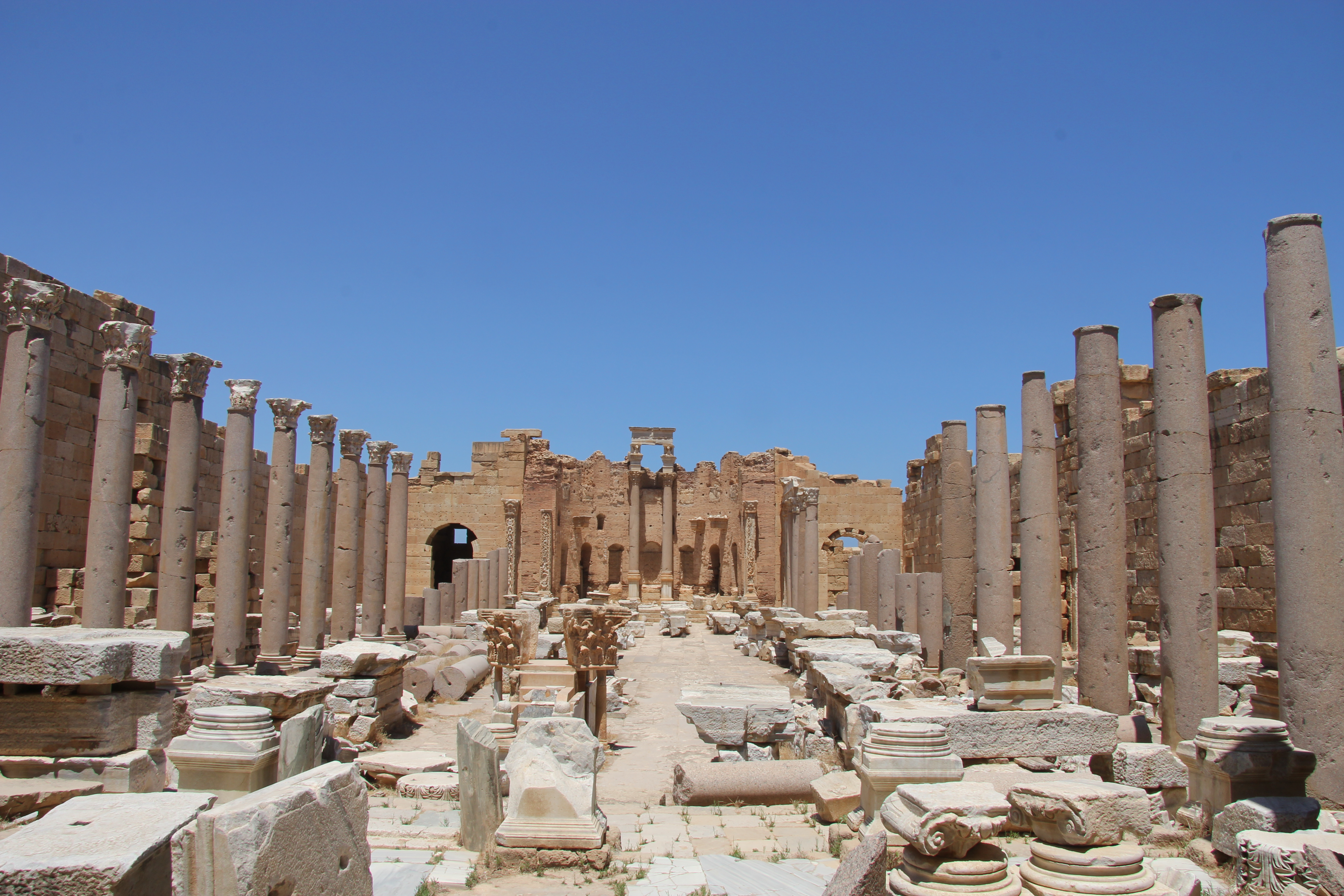
Leptis Magna

Between the first century BC and the fourth century AD, several expeditions and explorations to Lake Chad and western Africa were conducted by groups of military and commercial units of Romans who moved across the Sahara and into the interior of Africa and its coast. However, there was a more significant Roman and Greek presence in modern-day Eritrea and Ethiopia. The primary motivation for the expeditions was to secure sources of gold and spices from Axumite piracy.

== Background ==
Romans referred to sub-Saharan Africa as Aethiopia (Ethiopia), which referred to the people's "burned" skin. They also had available memoirs of the ancient Carthage explorer, Hanno the Navigator, being referenced by the Roman Pliny the Elder (c. 23–79) and the Greek Arrian of Nicomedia (c. 86–160).

== Characteristics ==
All of their expeditions were supported by legionaries and had mainly a commercial purpose. Only the one conducted by emperor Nero seemed to be a preparative for the conquest of Ethiopia or Nubia; in 62 AD, a tribune and 2 centurions explored the sources of the Nile.

One of the main objectives of the explorations was to locate and obtain gold, using camels to transport it overland back to Roman provinces on the Mediterranean coast.

== Main explorations ==
The Romans conducted five main explorations: two in the western Sahara, two in the central Sahara, and one in the area of Lake Chad.

=== Western Sahara expeditions ===
In western Sahara there were two Roman expeditions, just south of the Atlas Mountains:

- Cornelius Balbus expedition: According to Pliny, the first Roman expedition through the Sahara was the one led by Cornelius Balbus, who in 19 BC probably reached the Niger River near Timbuktu. He embarked from Libyan Sabratha and with ten thousand legionaries conquered the Garamantes capital in Fezzan. He then sent a small group of his legionaries further south across the Ahaggar Mountains to explore the "land of the lions”. There they found the Niger River, which in their opinion flowed into the Nile River. In 1955, Roman coins and ceramics were found in the area of Mali.
- Suetonius Paulinus expedition: The second was done in the year 41 AD by Suetonius Paulinus, a Roman Consul, who led an army in pursuit of bandits from modern day Tlemcen across the Atlas range, reaching the river Ger (modern day Oued Guir). He then penetrated into the semi-deserted country south of Morocco and some of his legionaries probably went near the river Daras (modern Senegal river).

From the first century AD there is evidence (coins and fibulae) of Roman commerce and contacts in Akjoujt and Tamkartkart near Tichit in Mauritania.

=== Central Sahara expeditions ===
The two main explorations/expeditions in the central Sahara were:

- Flaccus expedition: In the first century AD, Lake Chad was a huge lake and two Roman expeditions were carried out in order to reach it: Septimius Flaccus and Julius Maternus reached the "lake of hippopotamus" (as Lake Chad was called by Ptolemy). They moved from coastal Tripolitania and passed near the Tibesti Mountains. Both did their expeditions through the Garamantes' territories, and were able to leave a small garrison on the "lake of hippopotamus and rhinoceros" after 3 months of travel in desert lands.
  Ptolemy wrote that in 50 AD Septimius Flaccus carried out his expedition in order to retaliate against nomad raiders who attacked Leptis Magna, and reached Sebha and the territory of Aozou. He then reached the Bahr Erguig, Chari, and Logone Rivers in the lake Chad area, described as the "land of Ethiopes" (or black men) and called Agisymba.
- Matiernus expedition: Ptolemy wrote that around 90 AD Julius Maternus (or Matiernus) carried out a mainly commercial expedition. From the Sirte gulf he reached the Oasis of Cufra and the Oasis of Archei, then arrived—after 4 months travelling with the king of the Garamantes—to the Bahr Salamat and Bahr Aouk Rivers, near modern-day Central African Republic in a region then called Agisymba. He went back to Rome with a rhinoceros with two horns, that was shown in the Colosseum.
  According to Raffael Joorde, Maternus was a diplomat who explored with the king of Garamantes the territory south of the Tibesti Mountains, while this king executed a military campaign against rebellious subjects or as a "razzia".

=== Niger River area ===
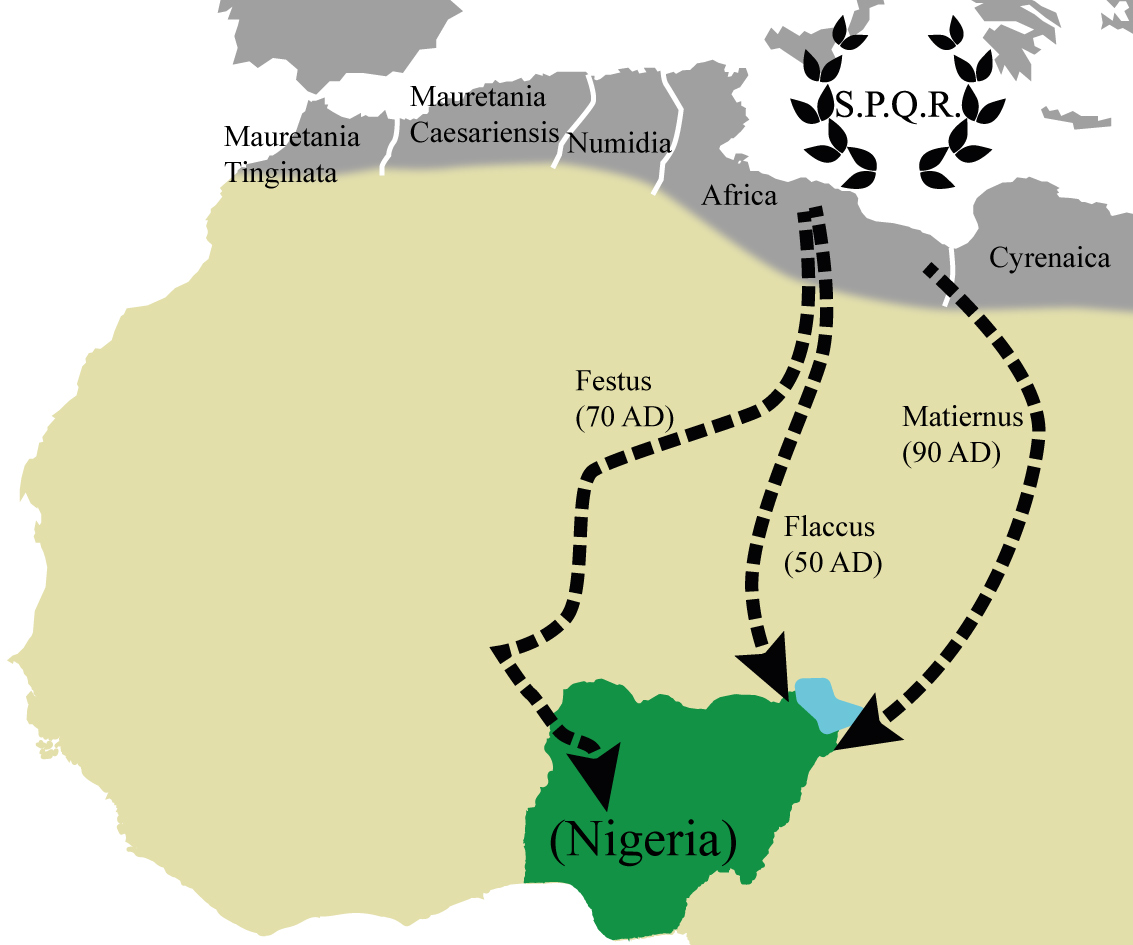
Roman exploration of Nigeria

However, some historians (like Susan Raven) believe that there was even another Roman expedition to sub-Saharan central Africa: the one of Valerius Festus, that could have reached the equatorial Africa thanks to the Niger River.

- Festus expedition: Pliny wrote that in 70 AD a legatus legionis, or commander, of the Legio III Augusta named Festus repeated the Balbus expedition toward the Niger River. Festus went to the eastern Hoggar Mountains and penetrated the Aïr Mountains as far as the Gadoufaoua plain. Festus finally arrived in the area in which Timbuktu is now located. Some academics, such as Fage, think that he only reached the Ghat region in southern Libya, near the border with southern Algeria and Niger. However, it is possible that a few of his legionaries reached as far as the Niger River and went south to the equatorial forests, navigating the river to its estuary in what is now Nigeria. Something similar may have occurred in the exploration of the Nile under Emperor Nero.

== Roman coins in Africa ==
Roman coins have been found in areas of the present-day Guinea, Ghana, Nigeria, Niger, and Togo. However, it is much more likely that all these coins were introduced at a much later date than that there was direct Roman intercourse so far down the western coast. No single article unmistakably originating in Africa south of the Equator has been discovered in the Graeco-Roman world or in contemporary Arabia, nor is there any mention of such an article in written records: while the coins are the only ancient European or Arabian articles that have been found in the central parts of Africa.

== See also ==
- European exploration of Africa
- Periplus of the Erythraean Sea

== Bibliography ==
- Arrian (2013). Alexander the Great: The Anabasis and the Indica. Translated by Hammond, Martin. Oxford World's Classics. ISBN 978-0-19-958724-7.
- Coleman De Graft-Johnson, John. African glory: the story of vanished Negro civilizations. Black Classic Press. New York, 1986 ISBN 0933121032
- Fage, JD. The Cambridge History of Africa Volume 2. Cambridge University Press. Cambridge, 1979 ISBN 0521215927
- Mattern, Susan. Rome and the enemy: imperial strategy in the principate. University of California Press. San Francisco, 2002 ISBN 0520236831
- Miller, J. Innes. The Cinnamon Route in the Spice Trade of the Roman Empire. University Press. Oxford, 1996 ISBN 0-19-814264-1
- Pliny the Elder (1855). The Natural History. Translated by John Bostock; H.T. Riley. London: Taylor and Francis, Red Lion Court, Fleet Street.
- Raven, Susan. Rome in Africa. Publisher Routledge. London, 2012 ISBN 113489239X
- Roth, Jonathan. The logistics of the Roman Army at war (264 B.C. – A.D. 235). Köln : Brill, 1998 (Columbia studies in the classical tradition; Vol. 23) ISBN 90-04-11271-5
- The Cambridge History of Africa, Volume 2 (from CA. 500 B.C. to A.D. 1050). Michael Crowder (& J. Fage). Cambridge University Press, 1975 ISBN ISBN 052122215X
