= Nero's exploration of the Nile =

Attempt to find the source of the Nile by Nero

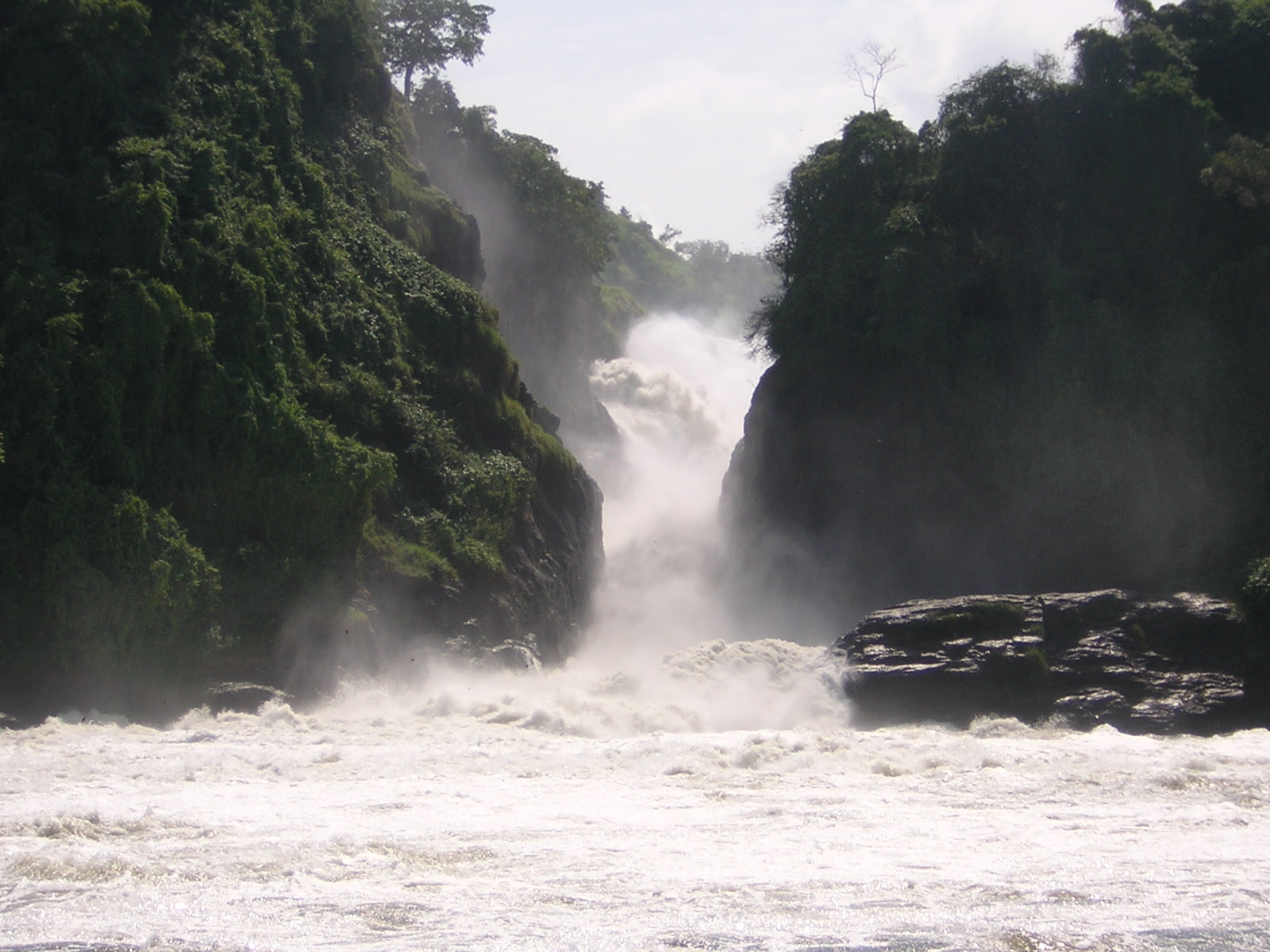
Murchison Falls in Uganda, that perhaps were reached by a Roman expedition promoted by Nero

In AD 61, Emperor Nero sent a small expedition of praetorian guards to explore the Nile's sources. The mission, part scientific inquiry and part reconnaissance for a potential invasion, was ultimately thwarted by the vast and impassable Sudd swamp in what is now South Sudan.

== History ==
Around 61 AD Emperor Nero sent a small group of praetorian guards to explore the sources of the Nile in Africa. The Roman legionaries navigating the Nile from southern Egypt initially reached the city of Meroë and later moved to the Sudd, where they had difficulties going further.

Seneca wrote about this exploration and detailed that the sources were from a big lake in central Africa, south of the Sudd. Other Roman historians, such as Pliny, suggest that the exploration was also done in order to prepare a conquest of Ethiopia by Nero's legions. However, the death of Nero prevented further explorations of the Nile as well as a possible Roman conquest south of Roman Egypt.

Some historians suggest that the Roman legionaries of Nero possibly reached the Murchison Falls in Uganda, but this is controversial.

== Accounts of Seneca and Pliny ==
Accounts are found in Seneca the Younger's Naturales quaestiones, VI.8.3 and Pliny the Elder's Natural History, VI.XXXV, p. 181-187:

The Roman legionaries navigating the Nile from southern Egypt initially reached the city of Meroe and later moved to the Sudd, where they had difficulties going further.

From Meroe the Roman party travelled 600 miles up the White Nile, until they reached the swamp-like Sudd in what is now southern Sudan, a fetid wetland filled with ferns, papyrus reeds and thick mats of rotting vegetation. In the rainy season it covers an area larger than England, with a vast humid swamp teeming with mosquitoes and other insects. The only large animals in the Sudd were the crocodiles and hippos that occupied the muddy pools within its vast expanse. Those who entered this region had to endure severe heat and risk disease and starvation. The Sudd was discovered to be too deep to be crossed safely on foot, but its waters were also too shallow to be explored any further by boat. The Romans ‘reached an area where the swamp could only bear a small boat containing one person’. At this point the party despaired of ever finding a definite source for the Nile and turned back reluctantly to report their findings to the emperor in Rome. They had probably reached a position nearly 1,500 miles south of the Roman-Egyptian border.

— Raoul McLaughlin

Seneca wrote De Nubibus, in the book Naturales Quaestiones, that gave details about a Neronian expedition to the caput mundi investigandum (to explore the top of the world) in 61/62 AD. In this book he recorded what two legionaries told him about their discovery of the caput Nili (the origin of the Nile River): "ibi vidimus duas petras, ex quibus ingens vis fluminis excidebat…ex magno terrarum lacu ascendere…" ("We saw two huge rocks, from which the power of the [Nile] river went out in a powerful way...." [The Nile river] comes from a very huge lake of the [African] lands).

Map of the Nile river showing the location of Jinja in Uganda (near the Murchison Falls)

Some modern historians, such as Giovanni Vantini and D'Ambrosio, argue that this place is the Murchison Falls in northern Uganda, meaning that the Romans may have reached equatorial Africa. The expedition from Roman Egypt reached the area of Jinja in Uganda, according to Vantini.

This lake, according to Vannini, could be Lake Victoria, the largest lake in Africa. The only river that outflows from this lake is the White Nile (named the "Victoria Nile" when exits the lake), that in Jinja (Uganda) goes north toward the Murchison Falls.

Indeed, the Murchison Falls is a waterfall on the Nile that breaks the Victoria Nile, which flows across northern Uganda from Lake Victoria to Lake Kyoga and then to the north end of Lake Albert in the western branch of the East African Rift. At the top of Murchison Falls, the Nile forces its way through a gap in the rocks only 7 metres (23 ft) wide, and tumbles 43 metres (141 ft), then flows westward into Lake Albert.

Indeed, Vantini wrote in the magazine Nigrizia, in 1996, that the legionaries completed a journey of exploration of more than 5,000 km from Meroe to Uganda: a remarkable achievement done using small boats in order to bypass the Sudd, a huge swamp full of dangerous Nile crocodiles.

Historian David Braund wrote, in 2015, that Nero's expedition to the Nile's sources probably opened a new route toward the Indian Ocean, bypassing the dangers of piracy in the Red Sea area while allowing future Roman commerce toward India and Azania.

== Consequence of the exploration ==
The account of the expedition was certainly known – a few decades later – to the Roman merchants who resided in Egypt. Indeed, Diogene, a Roman merchant who lived between 70 and 130 AD, returning from one of his voyages, sailed along the Sinus Arabicus (the Red Sea) and, after having touched Adulis and Rhapta (near the border between Tanzania and Mozambique), he marched into the interior of the continent, up to two large lakes behind which rose the snow-capped mountains from where he thought the Nile was born. He called the snow-capped peaks of the Meru and Kilimanjaro mountains the "Mountains of the Moon"; Lake Victoria, Lake Eyasi and Lake Natron the "Lakes of the Moon"; and those territories corresponding to the current Serengeti National Park the "Highlands of the Moon".

The Romano-Phoenician Marinus of Tyre also told the story of Diogene's journey, as did Claudius Ptolemy, who attested that in the center of the African continent there were certainly those large lakes fed by the "Mountains of the Moon" from which the Nile emerged.

== See also ==
- Romans in sub-Saharan Africa
