= Agisymba =

Lost ancient African country

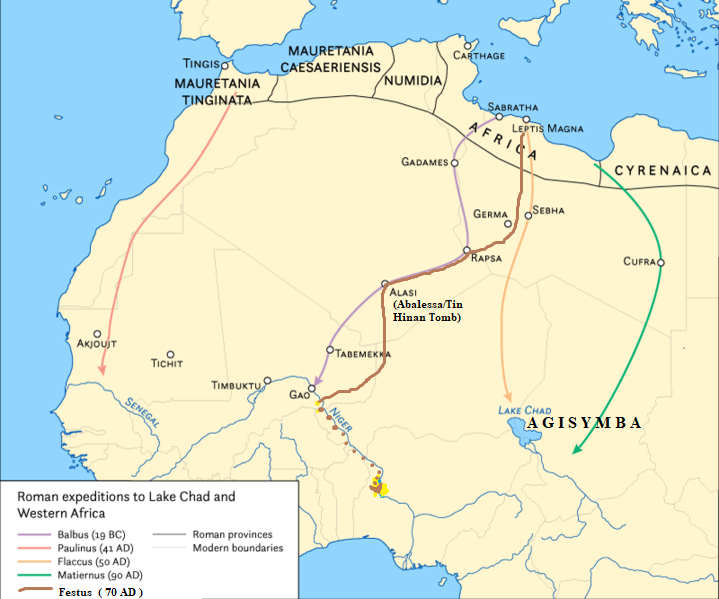
Map showing the "Agisymba" territory, during Roman explorations of Sub-Saharan Africa

Agisymba (Ancient Greek: Ἀγίσυμβα) was an unidentified country located in Africa mentioned by Ptolemy in the middle of the 2nd century AD.

== Background ==
According to Ptolemy's writings, Agisymba was found a four months' journey south of Fezzan and was characterized by large animals, such as rhinoceroses and elephants, as well as many tall mountains. Agisymba was located near Lake Chad which at the time was much larger than it is today.

Ptolemy's account is based on that written by Marinus of Tyre between 107 and 115 AD. Between the years 83 and 92 AD, the king of the Garamantes claimed that the inhabitants of Agisymba were his subjects.

In AD 90 a traveller, probably a trader, called Julius Maternus, profiting from the improved relations between the Romans and the Garamantes at this time – no doubt as a result of Flaccus's success – made his way from Leptis Magna through the land of the Garamantes to the land of Agisymba, where there were rhinoceroses.

Indeed, Ptolemy wrote that around 90 AD, Julius Maternus (or Matiernus) undertook a mainly commercial expedition. From the Gulf of Sirte he reached the oasis of Kufra and Archei, then – after four months of traveling with the king of the Garamantes – he arrived at the rivers Bahr Salamat and Bahr Aouk, in modern Chad in a region then called Agisymba. He went back to Rome with a rhinoceros with two horns that was shown in the Colosseum.

== See also ==
- Romans in sub-Saharan Africa

== Sources ==
- Desanges, Jehan, Recherches sur l'activité des méditerranéens aux confins de l'Afrique, Rome 1978 (pp. 197–213).
- Huss, Werner: "Agisymba", in: Der Neue Pauly, vol. I, Stuttgart 1996 (col. 260).
- Lange, Dierk, Ancient Kingdoms of West Africa, Dettelbach 2004 (pp. 280–284).
