= Ruhijha mine =

Tungsten mine in Uganda

- Location: Eastern Region, Uganda
- Products: Tungsten

The Ruhijha mine is a large open pit mine located in the northeastern part of Uganda in Eastern Region. Ruhijha represents one of the largest tungsten reserves in Uganda having estimated reserves of 30 million tonnes of ore grading 0.5% tungsten.

== See also ==
- Mining industry of Uganda
