= Murchison Falls =

Waterfall on the Victoria Nile in Western Region, Uganda

- Kabalega Falls
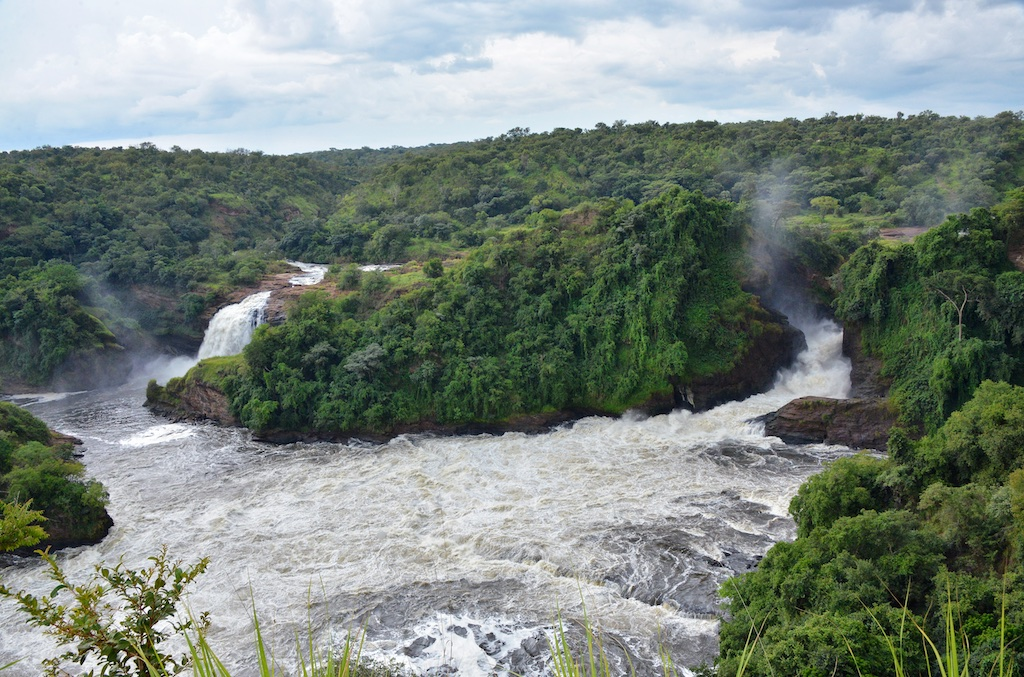
- The waterfall in 2014

- Location within Uganda
- Location: Uganda
- Coordinates: 2°16′42″N 31°41′8″E
- Watercourse: Victoria Nile

Murchison Falls, also known as Kabalega Falls, is a waterfall in Uganda, located at the apex of Lake Albert on the White Nile. At the top of Murchison Falls, the Nile forces its way through a gap in the rocks, only 7 m (23 ft) wide, and tumbles 43 m (141 ft), before flowing westward into Lake Albert. The outlet of Lake Victoria sends around 300 m^{3}/s (11,000 cu ft/s) of water over the falls, squeezed into a gorge less than 10 m (33 ft) wide.

Some historians believe that a party of Roman legionaries dispatched by Nero to explore the Nile may have reached Murchison Falls in 61 AD, but there is major controversy about the feasibility of what would have been a very difficult achievement.

Samuel Baker and Florence Baker were the first Europeans who officially sighted the falls. Baker named them after Roderick Murchison, the President of the Royal Geographical Society. The falls lend their name to the surrounding Murchison Falls National Park.

During the regime of Idi Amin in the 1970s, the name was changed to Kabalega Falls, after the Omukama (King) Kabalega of Bunyoro, although this was never legally promulgated. The name reverted to Murchison Falls following the downfall of Amin. It is still sometimes referred to as Kabalega Falls.

Ernest Hemingway crashed a plane just downriver from Murchison Falls in 1954. In August 2019, Uganda rejected a hydropower project by South Africa’s Bonang Power and Energy in order to preserve the falls, one of the country's most lucrative tourism sites.

== See also ==
- List of waterfalls
- List of waterfalls by flow rate
- Paraa
