= Osukuru Thermal Power Station =

Planned thermal power plant in Uganda

- Location of Osukuru Thermal Power Station
- Country: Uganda
- Location: Osukuru, Tororo, Tororo District
- Coordinates: 00°37′56″N 34°09′30″E
- Status: Planned
- Commission date: 2020 (expected)
- Owner: Guangzhou Dongsong Energy Group

Thermal power station
- Primary fuel: Chemical

Power generation
- Nameplate capacity: 12 MW (16,000 hp)

The Osukuru Thermal Power Station is a planned 12 MW (16,000 hp) chemical-fired thermal power plant in Uganda.

== Location ==
The power station would be in Osukulu Hills, about 8 kilometres (5 mi), by road, south of the central business district of Tororo, the headquarters of the Tororo District. This is approximately 204 kilometres (127 mi), by road, east of Kampala, the capital of the country.

== Overview ==
The power station is a planned joint project by the government of Uganda and the Chinese Guangzhou Dongsong Energy Group. The station would be part of a US$620 million development known as the Osukuru Industrial Complex. The plant primarily would use excess heat generated during the chemical processes in the manufacturing complex to heat either steam or compressed air, which would turn the turbines and generate the electricity. Construction of the industrial complex commenced in October 2015.

== See also ==
- List of power stations in Uganda
