= Kakira Airport =

Airport in Uganda

- IATA: none; ICAO: HUKK

Summary
- Airport type: Private & civilian
- Owner: Madhvani Group
- Serves: Kakira, Uganda
- Elevation AMSL: 3,960 ft (1,210 m)
- Coordinates: 00°29′56″N 033°16′57″E

Map
- Location of airport in Uganda

Runways
Direction	Length		Surface
Direction	m	ft	Surface
01/19	1,280	4,199	Paved

Kakira Airport (ICAO: HUKK) is one of the 46 airports in Uganda. It is a small private, civilian airport in Kakira, Jinja District, Eastern Region. The geographic coordinates of this airport are 00 degrees, 29 minutes, 56 seconds north and 33 degrees, 16 minutes, 57 seconds east (latitude: 0.4990; longitude: 33.2825). It is approximately 107 kilometres (66 mi), by air, east of Entebbe International Airport, the country's largest civilian and military airport.

The airport is adjacent to the Kakira Sugar Factory and within the Kakira estate close to the main family residences on the Madhvani estate. The private airport serves the town of Kakira and the Madhvani Group. Its operations are privately administered and, as of December 2009, not by the Uganda Civil Aviation Authority.

== Facilities ==
The airport is 3,960 feet (1,207 m) above sea level and has a single paved runway that is 1,280 metres (4,199 ft) in length.

== See also ==
- List of airports in Uganda
- Transport in Uganda
