= Paraa =

- Location in Uganda
- Coordinates: 02°18′00″N 31°33′00″E
- Country: Uganda
- Region: Northern Uganda
- Sub-region: Acholi sub-region
- District: Nwoya District
- Elevation: 2,230 ft (680 m)

Paraa is a location in Northern Uganda.

== Location ==
Paraa is located in Nwoya District, Acholi sub-region, in Northern Uganda. It is located within Murchison Falls National Park, the largest wildlife reserve in Uganda, measuring approximately 5,000 square kilometres (1,900 mi^{2}). This location lies approximately 25 kilometres (16 mi), by road, southeast of Pakwach, on the bank of the Albert Nile. and approximately 86 kilometres (53 mi), by road, northwest of Masindi. The coordinates of Paraa are:02 18 00N, 31 33 00E (Latitude:2.3000; Longitude:31.5500).

== Overview ==
Built in the early 1950s, Paraa, meaning the place of hippos in Luo, is one of the main attractions of the park, in addition to the dramatic Murchison Falls and the large variety of bird and animal species.

Paraa is the location of Paraa Safari Lodge, a facility with 60 rooms and suites, located on a hill on the northern bank of the river, overlooking the River Nile and close to the Murchison Falls themselves. Amenities include a large swimming pool, a restaurant, a bar, en-suite bathrooms and balconies on all rooms. The facility, having been destroyed during the reign of Idi Amin in the 1970s, has now been restored and is currently managed by the Madhvani Group, who also manage Mweya Safari Lodge in Queen Elizabeth National Park. Paraa Safari Lodge itself hosted the Queen Mother in the 1950s and by the 1960s it had attained mass popularity.

Winston Churchill walked the 86 kilometres (53 mi) from Masindi to see Paraa in 1907. In 1864, the explorer Samuel Baker, wrote of "a magnificent sight" suddenly bursting upon his party. Other famous visitors to the park were Emin Pasha, Theodore Roosevelt and the American novelist Ernest Hemingway, whose plane dipped to catch sight of the Murchison Falls, went too low and caught a telephone wire and crashed. He and his wife survived the crash.

== Landmarks ==
The landmarks within or near Paraa include:

- Pakuba Airport - A public airport located at Pakuba, approximately 14 kilometres (8.7 mi), by road, west of Paraa.
- Paraa Safari Lodge - A private safari lodge operated by the Madhvani Group
- Murchison Falls - The Nile River squeezes through a narrow gorge, only 7 metres (23 ft) wide, then plunges 43 metres (141 ft) to form the falls.

== Photos ==
- Photos of Paraa at Google.com
- Photo of Paraa Safari Lodge

== See also ==
- Nwoya District
- Murchison Falls National Park
- Murchison Falls
- Acholi sub-region
- Northern Region, Uganda
