= Nyamuliro mine =

Tungsten mine in Western, Uganda

- Location within Uganda
- Location: Western Region, Uganda; 1°9′0″S 29°48′0″E
- Products: Tungsten

The Nyamuliro mine is a large open pit mine located in the south western part of Uganda in Western Region. Nyamuliro represents one of the largest tungsten reserves in Uganda having estimated reserves of 10 million tones of ore grading 0.5% tungsten.

The mine was taken over by KI3R Minerals Ltd, a subsidiary of Kerilee Investments, in 2016 from Krone Uganda Ltd.

== Protests ==
In early 2020, KI3R stopped operation at the Nyamuliro mine, in response to President Yoweri Museveni's halt of exporting raw minerals. This left the 2,200 workers that had been employed daily by the mine without work. The Nyamuriro Wolfram Workers Association carried out demonstrations to protest against this closure.

== See also ==
- Mining industry of Uganda
