= Marinus of Tyre =

Roman cartographer and mathematician (c.70–130)

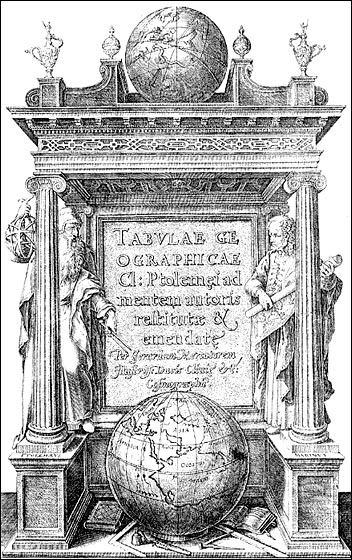
Cover for "Tabulae geographicae" (1578), work of Ptolemy. Depicted are both Ptolemy and Marinus of Tyre, very likely in this order.

Marinus of Tyre (Ancient Greek: Μαρῖνος ὁ Τύριος, Marînos ho Týrios; c. AD 70–130) was a Greek-speaking Phoenician Roman geographer, cartographer and mathematician, who founded mathematical geography and provided the underpinnings of Claudius Ptolemy's influential Geography.

== Life ==
Marinus was originally from Tyre in the Roman province of Phoenicia. His work was a precursor to that of the great geographer Claudius Ptolemy, who, some forty years later, used Marinus’ work as a source for his Geography and acknowledges his great obligations to him. Marinus could profit from a plethora of new geographical information that had recently become available as a result of trade and military expeditions. In view of his interest in trade routes it may be that Marinus had a background in commerce, but it is clear that he did not hold businessmen in very high regard: as Ptolemy said, "Marinus says of the merchant class generally that they are only intent on their business, and have little interest in exploration, and that often through their love of boasting they magnify distances."

Marinus probably worked at the Library of Alexandria, where access to the various geographical data he needed was relatively easy. If so, a young Ptolemy may have personally met an old Marinus there (whom he calls the "most recent [geographer] in our time"), the two discussing plans to finish the world map project. Unlike Ptolemy, Marinus’s understanding of mathematics and astronomy was limited: Ptolemy justly explains that a discussion of the relation between astronomical observations and geographical latitude was quite flawed.

Later, in the tenth century, Marinus was also mentioned five times by the Arab geographer al-Mas‘ūdī in his book Kitāb at-tanbīh wa’l-išrāf (Book of Admonition and Revision). However, though Mas‘ūdī claims he is referring to Marinus as his source, it can be shown that all five remarks go back to Ptolemy’s Geography.

Beyond this, little is known of his life.

== Legacy ==
=== Innovations by Marinus ===
Marinus's geographical treatise, possibly called A Revision of the Geographical Map, Τοῦ γεωγραφικοῦ πίνακος διόρθωσις, (which can be argued to date from between AD 106 and AD 114), is lost. But the work was thoroughly discussed bij Ptolemy in his Geography, who even gives a few direct quotations. Ptolemy praises Marinus for his improvements to the construction of a world map. Marinus had collected many kinds of geographical data, such as astronomically determined geographical latitudes, relative positions of pairs of cities, lists of cities on the same meridian and lists of cities on the same parallel, nautical charts and coastal descriptions, lists of the borders of Roman provinces, and travel reports by traders and military expeditions. Marinus had tried to integrate these data into a single world map, but though he had succeeded in making a preliminary version of such a map, he had not completed the work. Ptolemy would, in his Geography, critically review Marinus's data, correct inconsistencies, and develop his own world atlas.

Earlier geographers, such as Eratosthenes or Hipparchos, already used a system of parallels. Marinus apparently devised a comprehensive system of latitude and longitude: the global surface was divided in horizontal strips along certain parallels (so-called "klima" zones) and vertical strips between meridians ("hour zones"). His zero meridian ran through the westernmost land known during his time, the Isles of the Blessed, around the location of the present-day Canary or Cape Verde Islands.

Like earlier geographers Marinus used an equirectangular projection for his map, where the standard parallel was the parallel of Rhodes, at 36 degrees North. Marinus estimated a length of 180,000 stadia for the equator, roughly corresponding (Note: For a value of a 185 m or 607 ft per stadion.) to a circumference of the Earth of 33,300 kilometres (20,700 mi), about 17% less than the actual value. At the latitude of Rhodes one degree in longitude then corresponded to 400 stadia. Marinus thought that the inhabited world stretched in latitude from Thule (Norway) at 63 degrees North to Agisymba at 24 degrees South (around the Tropic of Capricorn) and in longitude from the Isles of the Blessed (around the Canaries) to Sera (China) at 225 degrees East.

=== A reconstruction of Marinus's world map ===
The inhabited world according to Marinus of Tyre (reconstruction).

Marinus's world map can be approximately reconstructed from Ptolemy's description, by reverting the corrections Ptolemy made to it, and which, luckily, he comprehensively describes in his Geography. Apparently in this way Ernst Honigmann made a reconstruction of Marinus's map in 1930.

Before Marinus, the most recent world map had been the one used by Strabo (c. 64 BCE - AD 24). This essentially was the map devised by Eratosthenes, dating from about 200 BCE. But where these older maps ended in Asia abruptly after the Ganges River, traders in the first century AD had found out that the continent extended further eastward, to China. Similarly, in Africa traders and military expeditions in the first century AD had shown that the continent extended further south.

Therefore, as Ptolemy tells us, Marinus had expanded the older maps eastward and southward—Marinus's maps were the first in the Roman Empire to show China. However, according to Ptolemy, Marinus had overdone the job. As Ptolemy discusses detailedly, both the East-West dimension of Asia (east of 72° East), and the North-South dimension of Africa (south of 6° North) were made too tall by Marinus. To find the longitude and latitude values assumed by Marinus we therefore have to stretch in reverse these regions from Ptolemy's data.

Besides these two major corrections, Ptolemy also lists a series of very minor errors in the European and Mediterranean section of Marinus's map. In view of the detailed attention Ptolemy gives to these minor corrections, if there had been more "grave errors" in Marinus's map we may be pretty sure that Ptolemy would have at least mentioned them. In fact, there are two clear candidates, where the older maps in two aspects conspicuously differ from Ptolemy's map:

• Ptolemy shows the Indian Ocean as an inner sea, in the south bordered by unknown land connecting Africa with East Asia. Eratosthenes and Strabo thought the Indian Ocean to be part of the single World Ocean (Okeanos) that surrounded all land.

• Eratosthenes and Strabo thought the Caspian Sea to be an inland gulf, part of the Northern Ocean; Ptolemy describes it as an inner sea, a large lake. We may note that the shape of the Caspian Sea had been object of intense discussion, so Ptolemy's silence here is revealing.

Now if Marinus's Indian Ocean and Caspian Sea would have looked like those of Eratosthenes and Strabo, Ptolemy would surely have scorned this as "major errors". That he did not, means that Marinus with respect to these hydrographic entities had presented the same view as Ptolemy; in fact we should credit Marinus with these two major innovations.

=== Continent by continent ===
In Europe there are few differences between Marinus's map and the one by Ptolemy. The "minor errors" in Europe that Ptolemy found in Marinus's work—most of them would be invisble on the scale of a world map—usually are inconsistencies that resulted from Marinus's approach. Because Marinus did not complete the integration of all his various data into a single map, inconsistencies remained undiscovered, but as Ptolemy concedes, Marinus would probably have discovered the inconsistencies himself and corrected them if he would have completed his final single world map.

In Africa Ptolemy adopts Marinus's latitudes down to about 6 degrees North (Cape Aromata). Further south, Marinus had assigned a latitude of 24 degrees South to central Africa (Agisymba and Cape Rhapton). However, Ptolemy noted that the skin colour reported there for its inhabitants and the occurrence of rhinoceroses resembled the Meroë region (16.4° North). Therefore Ptolemy judged that central Africa should best be placed at a similar distance from the equator, thus around latitude 16.4 degrees South.

Marinus's picture of the East coast of Africa was also different from Ptolemy's. Marinus, he says, assumed that the coastal route from Cape Aromata to Cape Prason was due South. Further, Marinus assumed that the source lakes of the Nile were close to the coast, and slightly north of Cape Rhapta. Ptolemy also comments that Marinus's order of the East-African coastal sites was wrong, but here he does not specify Marinus's ordering.

In Asia Ptolemy in extenso discusses Marinus's data for the Silk Route from the Euphrates to China ("Sera"), as well as the sea route from India to the East ("Sinae"). As said above, Ptolemy concludes that Marinus overestimated both distances. It is remarkable that neither Marinus nor Ptolemy was aware that both the land and the sea route led to the same country, China.

In Ptolemy's maps there features a very large gulf in the east, named the Great Gulf. Honigmann in his reconstruction eliminated this gulf, probably mistakenly, as Ptolemy nowhere hints that he here deviated from Marinus's data. Honigmann may have interpreted Marinus's statement that the sea route to Zabai runs due east as proof that the coast also ran due east, because in Antiquity sailing ships usually closely followed the coast line. Or he hypercorrected the map in view of a suggestion by Albert Herrmann that Ptolemy had wrongly combined sailors’ reports and had thus erroneously drawn the Great Gulf as a duplicate of the Perimulian Gulf. The almost perfectly circular shape of the Great Gulf, when projected onto Marinus’s map, also suggests that this feature was already present on the Marinus map.

The issue illustrates that both the Far East and the east coast of Africa are the two areas where both Marinus and Ptolemy found it most difficult to draw their maps, and where Ptolemy's Geography manuscripts show quite a few contradictions.

=== Miscellaneous ===
Marinus also coined the term Antarctic, referring to the opposite of the Arctic.

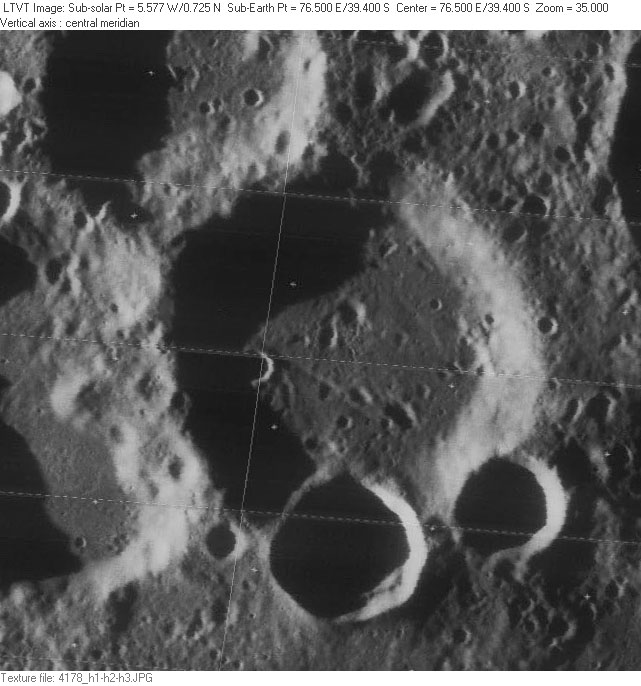
Lunar crater Marinus (NASA 1967)

In 1935, an impact crater on the Moon was named after Marinus.

== See also ==
- 1st century in Lebanon
