= Kakira Sugar Works =

Sugar manufacturer in Uganda

Coordinates: 00°30′36″N 33°17′24″E

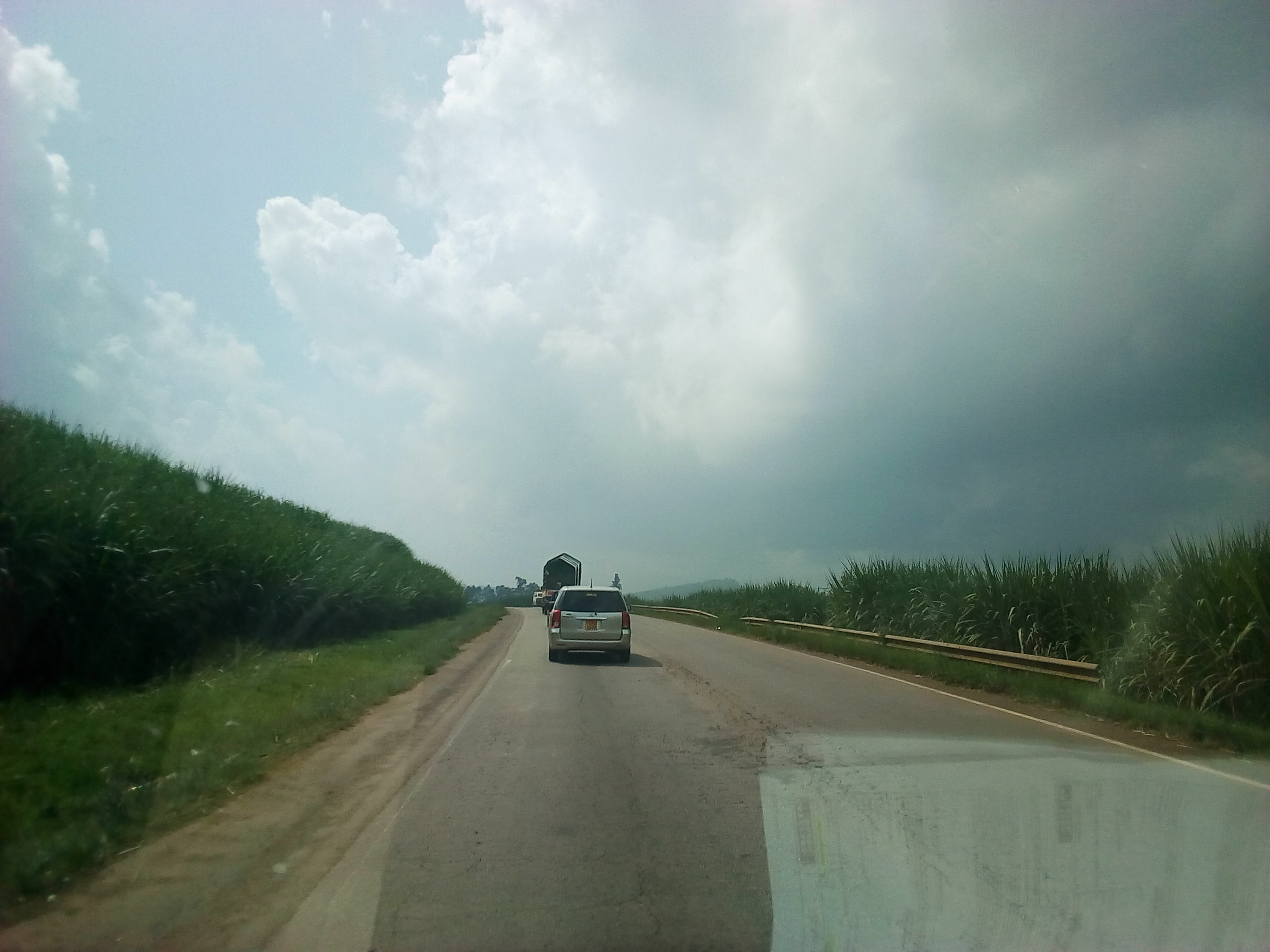
- Type: Private
- Industry: Manufacture and distribution of sugar
- Founded: 1 January 1930; 96 years ago
- Headquarters: Kakira, Uganda
- Products: Sugar
- Number of employees: 7,500+ (2011)
- Website: www.kakirasugar.com

Kakira Sugar Works Limited, often called Kakira Sugar Works, is a leading sugar manufacturer in Uganda, the third-largest economy in the East African Community.

== Location ==
The main factories of the company are located in the town of Kakira, in Jinja District, Eastern Uganda. This location lies approximately 16 kilometres (9.9 mi), by road, northeast of Jinja, the nearest large town. Kakira is located approximately 100 kilometres (62 mi), by road, east of Kampala, the capital of Uganda and the largest city in that country. The coordinates of the main factory are:0°30'36.0"N, 33°17'24.0"E (Latitude:0.5100; Longitude:33.2900). In addition to the factories in Kakira, the company maintains a corporate office along 5th Street, in Bugolobi, in Kampala Industrial Area, and offices and warehouses, in Kakira, Jinja and Kampala.

== Overview ==
Kakira Sugar Works is the largest manufacturer of sugar in Uganda, producing an estimated 165,000 metric tonnes of sugar annually, accounting for about 47 percent of the national output in 2011.

Kinyara Sugar Works in Masindi District is Uganda's second-largest sugar manufacturer, accounting for about 31% of annual national output. Sugar Corporation of Uganda Limited (SCOUL), in Buikwe District, accounts for about 17% of national production. The remaining 5% (about 15,000 metric tonnes annually), is produced by Sango Bay Estates Limited, in Sango Bay, Kyotera District.(See Annual Production & Market Share Among Uganda's Sugar Manufacturers)

The sugar produced by the companies is marketed to the Eastern African countries of South Sudan, Democratic Republic of the Congo, Burundi, Rwanda, Tanzania, Kenya and Uganda. Kakira Sugar Works is the flagship business of the Madhvani Group of Companies, the largest conglomerate in Uganda, accounting for over 10% of the gross domestic product (GDP) of Uganda in 2010. Kakira Sugar Works possesses its own social infrastructure : free schools for employees' children, roads, hospitals, staff housing...

== History ==
In 1920, the Vithaldas Haridas & Company, under the management of Muljibhai Madhvani, a twenty-six-year-old Indian-born Ugandan businessman, entrepreneur, industrialist and philanthropist, purchased 800 acres (3.2 km^{2}) of land, in Kakira, between Jinja and Iganga, for the purpose of starting a sugar factory. Muljibhai later became the managing director of Vithaldas Haridas & Company. That sugar complex, later renamed Kakira Sugar Works, opened in 1930. By adding to the original parcel of land, through purchases, the company land holdings at Kakira, were in excess of 9,500 hectares (37 mi^{2}), as of April 2009. The sugar manufacturing complex at Kakira employs over 7,500 people, according to the company website.

In 1987, Kakira Sugar Works went through a $59.38 million rehabilitation program funded by the World Bank and the African Development Bank. In 2000, the Madhvani group acquired 100% of Kakira Sugar Works' shares.

== Ownership ==
Kakira Sugar Works is a (100%) subsidiary of the Madhvani Group, based in Kakira, Uganda. The Group's shareholding is private and is not widely, publicly known.

== Expansion and upgrade ==
As of November 2013, Kakira Sugar Works Limited had gone through a USh 191 billion (about US$75 million) factory expansion and upgrade. USh 76.5 billion (about US$30 million), was raised through a 10-year corporate bond on the Uganda Securities Exchange, and the remainder was sourced from local banks. This upgrade boosted the factory's sugarcane crushing capacity to 7,500 tonnes per day. The co-generation capacity of Kakira Power Station, was also increased from 22 Megawatts to 52 Megawatts.

== Ethanol production ==
In November 2016, Kakira Sugar Works started production of industrial-grade ethanol, distilled from molasses, produced as a by-product of sugar manufacturing. The ethanol distillery, was constructed by Praj Industries of India, at a cost of USh 133 billion (US$36.6 million). The distillery is expected to process the 74,000 metric tonnes of molasses that the sugar mill produces annually, into 20,000,000 litres (4,399,385 imp gal; 5,283,441 US gal) of "fuel grade anhydrous ethanol".

== See also ==
- Kakira
- Jinja
- Jinja District
- Madhvani Group
- Muljibhai Madhvani
- Kakira Power Station
- Uganda Sugar Factories
