= Muljibhai Madhvani =

Ugandan businessman

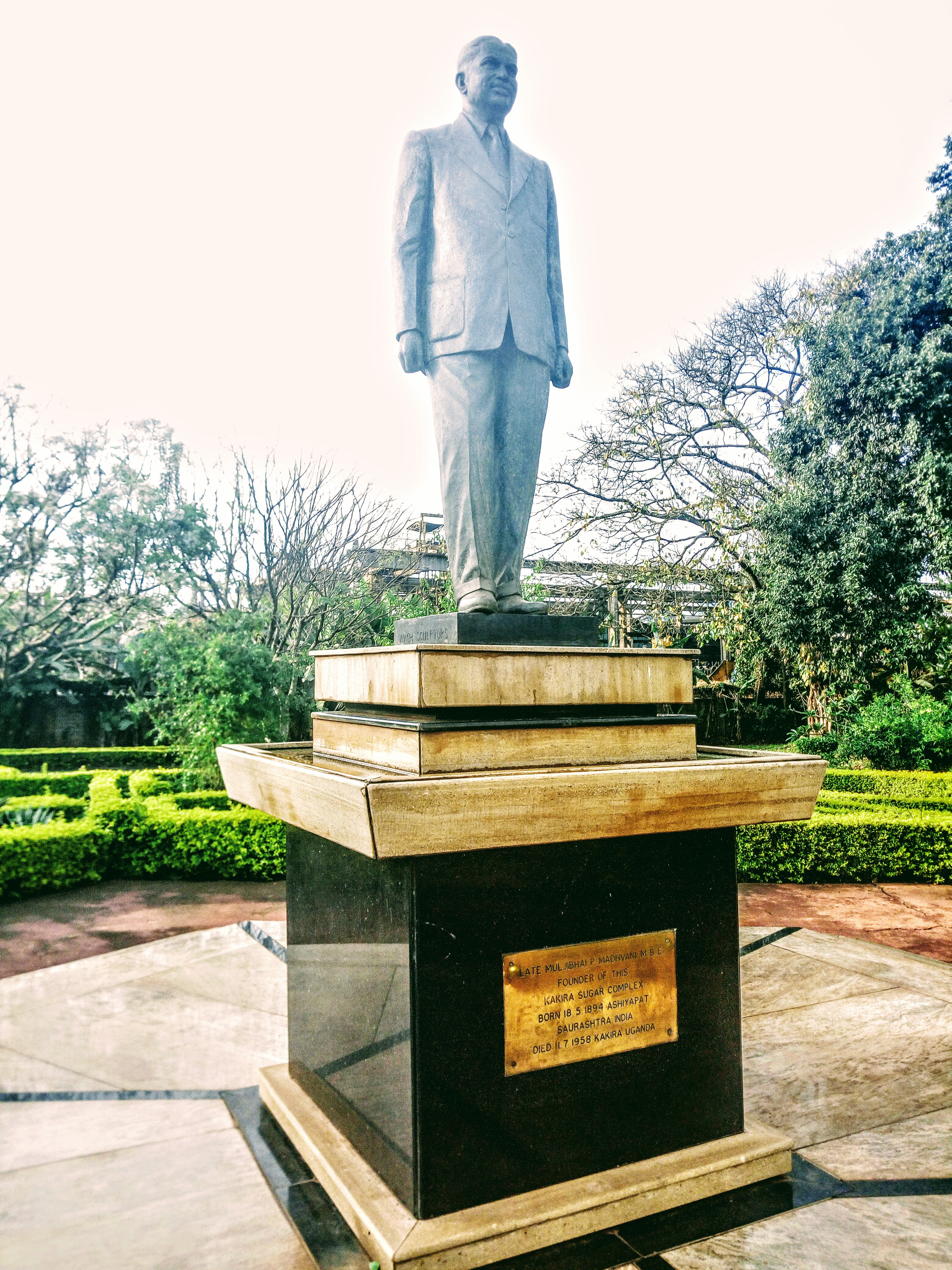
- Statue of Madhvani in Kakira
- Born: 18 May 1894; Ashiyapat, India
- Died: 8 July 1958 (aged 64); Kakira, Uganda
- Citizenship: Uganda
- Occupations: Businessman, industrialist, entrepreneur
- Years active: 1912–1958
- Known for: Business, Philanthropy
- Children: Jayant Madhvani, Manubhai Madhvani, Pratap Madhvani, Surendra Madhvani Mayur Madhvani, Mukesh Madhvani (sons)
- Relatives: Nimisha Madhvani (granddaughter); Mumtaz (daughter-in-law)

Mulji Prabhudas Madhvani (1894–1958), commonly referred to as Muljibhai Madhvani, was an Indian-born Ugandan businessman, entrepreneur, industrialist and philanthropist. Born in India, he migrated to Uganda when he was only 14 years old. In 1912, he started his first business in Jinja. He expanded and added to that initial investment and out of those efforts, the conglomerate known as the Madhvani Group was born.

== History ==
Muljibhai Madhvani was born to Prabhudasbhai Madhvani and Laduma Madhvani in Ashiyapat in Ranavav Taluka of Porbandar, India on 18 May 1894. He was born in a Gujarati Lohana caste. Quote: "Probably the success of the most prominent Lohana families in Uganda, Nanji Kalidas Mehta and Sons, M. P. Madhvani and D. K. Hindocha had much influence on Lohana migration from Porbandar and Jamnagar.." He studied up to Standard VII, before joining the Lohana Boarding House in Porbander, Bombay Presidency, India. He dropped out shortly after Class 1.

He migrated to Uganda in 1908, two years following his older brother Nanjibhai's East African emigration. In 1911, at age 17, he began working for his uncles, Vithaldas and Kalidas, in a retail business in Iganga. There he learned about trade and industry. Within that same year, his uncles entrusted him with opening up an affiliated store in Kaliro in modern-day Kaliro District.

The business acumen impressed his uncles enough that they later asked him to open another shop in Jinja, where he started to build his first business, Vithaldas Haridas & Company, while continuing to work for his uncles. In 1918, his company bought 800 acres (3.2 km^{2}) of land in Kakira, between Jinja and Iganga, for starting a sugar factory. Muljibhai later became the managing director of Vithaldas Haridas & Company. The sugar complex, which is today known as Kakira Sugar Works, opened in 1930. Through additional purchases of land, the current company land holdings at Kakira, free to an excess of 9,500 hectares (37 mi^{2}), by of April 2009.

Muljibhai's two elder sons, Jayant Madhvani and Manubhai Madhvani, joined him in 1946 to assist in running the business. It was during this decade that Muljibhai ventured into textiles and beer. Using what was probably the first International Finance Corporation loan to an African country, he set up Mulco Textiles in Jinja.

By the 1950s, the sugar estate was well established. He also acquired Nile Breweries in 1957. The brewery was divested to South African Breweries in 2002.

According to the group company profile, the years up to the 1960s were prosperous for Uganda and Madhvani. The commodity market was expanding and the middle class, spawned by Uganda's industrialisation, growing steadily.

As his business flourished, Muljibhai was keen to take care of the well-being and welfare of his employees and the community. His workers and their dependents have enjoyed free education, housing and healthcare, many decades before the term "corporate social responsibility" was even devised.

Muljibhai Madhvani died on 11 July 1958 in Kakira, where he was cremated. However a mausoleum that was constructed in his memory lies at the lakeside along that of his elder son and heir, Jayant Madhvani. After the death of their father, Jayant and his brother Manubhai, oversaw the group's diversification into oil and soap manufacturing, steel, tea and glass production.

Then came the Asian expulsion in 1972 by Idi Amin. By then, the group had grown into a complex of 52 industrial, commercial and agricultural companies, operating in East Africa, Central Africa and Southern Africa.

In 1972, the Madhvanis, who had known no other home besides Uganda, left the country penniless, along with thousands of other Asians Ugandans. However, the family returned in 1982 to repossess their properties under the Expropriated Properties Bill extended by the Obote government to coax Asians back to the country. On return, they found the sugar estate in shambles. Less than 5,000 acres (20 km^{2}) was under cane cultivation and sugar production had long ceased. All the associated industries such as oil and soap were mere shells of their former selves.

The company was debt-ridden and Uganda was uncreditworthy at the time. But the World Bank gave the group a £50 million (US$60 million) loan to rehabilitate the estate. More loans from the East African Development Bank and the Uganda Development Bank helped revive the conglomerate and fuel the acquisition of new assets.

== Prominent extended family members ==
The following are some of the prominent members of the Madhvani family:

- Muljibhai Madhvani (1894-1958) - family patriarch, founder of the Madhvani Group
- Jayant Madhvani (1922-1971) - Muljibhai's firstborn son. Ran the conglomerate after the death of his father
- Manubhai Madhvani (1930-2011) - Muljibhai's second son. Ran the conglomerate with his elder brother before the elder brother died. In 2008, he authored a book Tide of Fortune about the history of Asians in East Africa, the family business and his own experiences.
- Pratap Madhvani- Muljibhai's third son.
- Mayur Madhvani- Muljibhai's fifth and youngest son.
- Kamlesh Madhvani - Manubhai's eldest son.
- Roni Madhvani- Pratap's eldest son.
- Nikesh Madhvani- Pratap's younger son.
- Eshan Madhvani Esq- Nikesh's eldest son.

== See also ==
- Nanji Kalidas Mehta
- Nimisha Madhvani
