= Osukuru Industrial Complex =

Industry processing phosphate, iron and rare minerals in Uganda

Coordinates: 00°37′25″N 34°09′13″E

- Company type: Private
- Industry: Manufacturing
- Founded: Construction started 2014; Commissioned October 2018
- Headquarters: Sukulu Hills, Tororo, Uganda
- Key people: Jane Yaqiong Guo (Executive Director)
- Products: Fertilizer; electricity; mechanical workshop capable of milling, grinding, boring, planing with milling machines, lathe machine, plasma cutting steel; rare minerals & sulfuric acid
- Total assets: US$620 million (2018)
- Number of employees: 1,200+ (2018)
- Parent: Guangzhou Dongsong Energy Group Uganda Limited

The Osukuru Industrial Complex sometimes referred to as Sukulu Industrial Complex, is a set of related industries, in the mining and manufacturing sectors, under construction in Uganda, the third-largest economy in the East African Community.

== Location ==
The factories of Osukuru Industrial Complex are located in the Sukulu Hills in Osukuru County, Tororo District, Eastern Region of Uganda, just outside the town of Tororo and approximately 206 kilometres (128 mi), by road, east of Kampala, the capital and largest city of Uganda. The approximate coordinates of the Osukuru Industrial Complex are: 0°37'25.0"N, 34°09'13.0"E (Latitude:0.623611; Longitude:34.153611).

== Overview ==
The industrial complex will consist of (1) a phosphate fertilizer factory, (2) a steel manufacturing factory, (3) a sulphuric acid manufacturing factory, (4) a rare earth minerals mining plant, and (5) the Osukuru Thermal Power Station with capacity generation of 12 megawatts. In addition, the complex includes the largest organic fertilizer factory in East Africa, with capacity of 300,000 metric tonnes of organic fertiliser annually.

The industrial complex sits on 26.5 square kilometres (6,500 acres) of land in Osukuru sub-county and in neighboring Rubongi sub-county, Tororo District, close to the international border with Kenya. The industrial complex will support over 1,700 jobs once completed.

== History ==
A considerable amount of minerals, particularly flint, phosphorus and iron, have been known to exist in the Sukulu Hills south-west of the town of Tororo as far back as 1954.

Starting around 2008, the government of Uganda, began engaging various investors, including a local firm Nilefos Limited, a subsidiary of the Madhvani Group, to commercially exploit the deposits. Local landowners in the mining area, however, filed a lawsuit against the government, protesting the development. The landowners lost that case in 2010.

In 2013, the government began negotiations with Guangzhou Dong Song Energy Company Limited from China to set up a mining and manufacturing operation at Osukuru. In 2014, the government and landowners agreed that exploration and construction should begin.

== Construction timeline ==
The project will cost an estimated US$560 million to US$620 million and will be jointly owned by the Government of Uganda and Guangzhou Dong Song Energy Company Limited, a private Chinese company. Construction began in 2014 and was expected to last two years. Commissioning was expected during the fourth quarter of 2016. After delays, construction resumed in October 2015, starting with office blocks and staff housing. Construction is by the 23rd Metallurgical Construction Group Company Limited. When fully operational, the industrial complex is expected to employ more than 1,000 people. Funding is provided by China Export & Credit Insurance Corporation (SINOSURE) and Industrial and Commercial Bank of China (ICBC).

In February 2016, the developers reached financial closure with ICBC for a loan worth US$240 million. Some of the industries in the complex are expected to be commissioned in October 2018.

== Starting operations ==
In March 2018, the industrial complex advertised the first 92 jobs, looking to hire welders, storekeepers, drivers, security guards and supervisors. The MoU that Guangzhou Dongsong Energy Group signed with the government calls for employing people from Tororo District first, going outside the district only when the desired skills or expertise are lacking.

In August 2018, Irene Muloni, Uganda's Minister of Energy, commissioned the Uganda-China Guangdong Free Zone for International Cooperation, in which the 600 acres (2.4 km^{2}) Osukuru Industrial Complex is located. During the same month, Matia Kasaija, Uganda's Finance Minister, commissioned the fertilizer plant, with the steel plant expected online in July 2019. As of August 2018, the industrial complex employed about 1,000 people.

The phosphate fertilizer plant was commissioned on 23 October 2018. Steel production is expected to begin in July 2019. The first phase of the development is expected to employ an estimated 1,400 people at completion. This number s expected to rise to 3,000 people after completion of the second phase.

In November 2018, the Daily Monitor reported that a brick-baking division, embedded within the industrial complex was operational and manufactured 10,000 building bricks daily, with capacity production of 2.6 million bricks annually.

== See also ==
- Uganda Investment Authority
- List of power stations in Uganda
- Tororo
