= Kakira =

- Location in Uganda; Placement on map is approximate
- Coordinates: 00°30′13″N 33°16′57″E
- Country: Uganda
- Region: Eastern Uganda
- Sub-region: Busoga sub-region
- District: Jinja District
- Elevation: 4,000 ft (1,220 m)

Population (2024 Census)
  - Total: 42,854

Kakira is a town in the Eastern Region of Uganda. It is the location of the International headquarters of the Madhvani Group.

== Location ==
Kakira is located in Jinja District, approximately 14 kilometres (9 mi) east of downtown Jinja on the highway to Iganga. The coordinates of the town are: 0°30'13.0"N, 33°16'57.0"E (Latitude:0.503611; Longitude:33.282500).

== Population ==
In 2014, the national population census put the population of Kakira at 32,819.

== Madhvani Group activities ==
Kakira is the headquarters of the Madhvani Group, a diversified conglomerate involved in agribusiness, manufacturing, insurance, leisure services, and other business interests.

On an estate measuring 9,500 hectares (37 mi^{2}), the group owns a sugarcane farm and a sugar manufacturing complex, Kakira Sugar Limited. They also own a sweets and confectionery factory, Kakira Sweets & Confectioneries Limited. An electricity generating plant, Kakira Power Station, is located on the estate and produces 52 megawatts of power for use there, with the excess sold to the Ugandan national grid. The estate has a private airport, Kakira Airport, for use by the family and corporate clients. The airport is home to Turbo Prop Service Centre, a subsidiary that deals in aircraft servicing. In 2017 the Group set up a distillery that produces approximately 60,000 litres of ethanol per day.

The group at Kakira employs more than 8,500 people. The group provides a private 100-bed hospital, eight primary schools, and one secondary school for use by its workers and their dependents. And it greatly contributes to Uganda's GDP

== See also ==
- Jinja District
- List of cities and towns in Uganda
