= Madhvani Group =

Conglomerate in Uganda

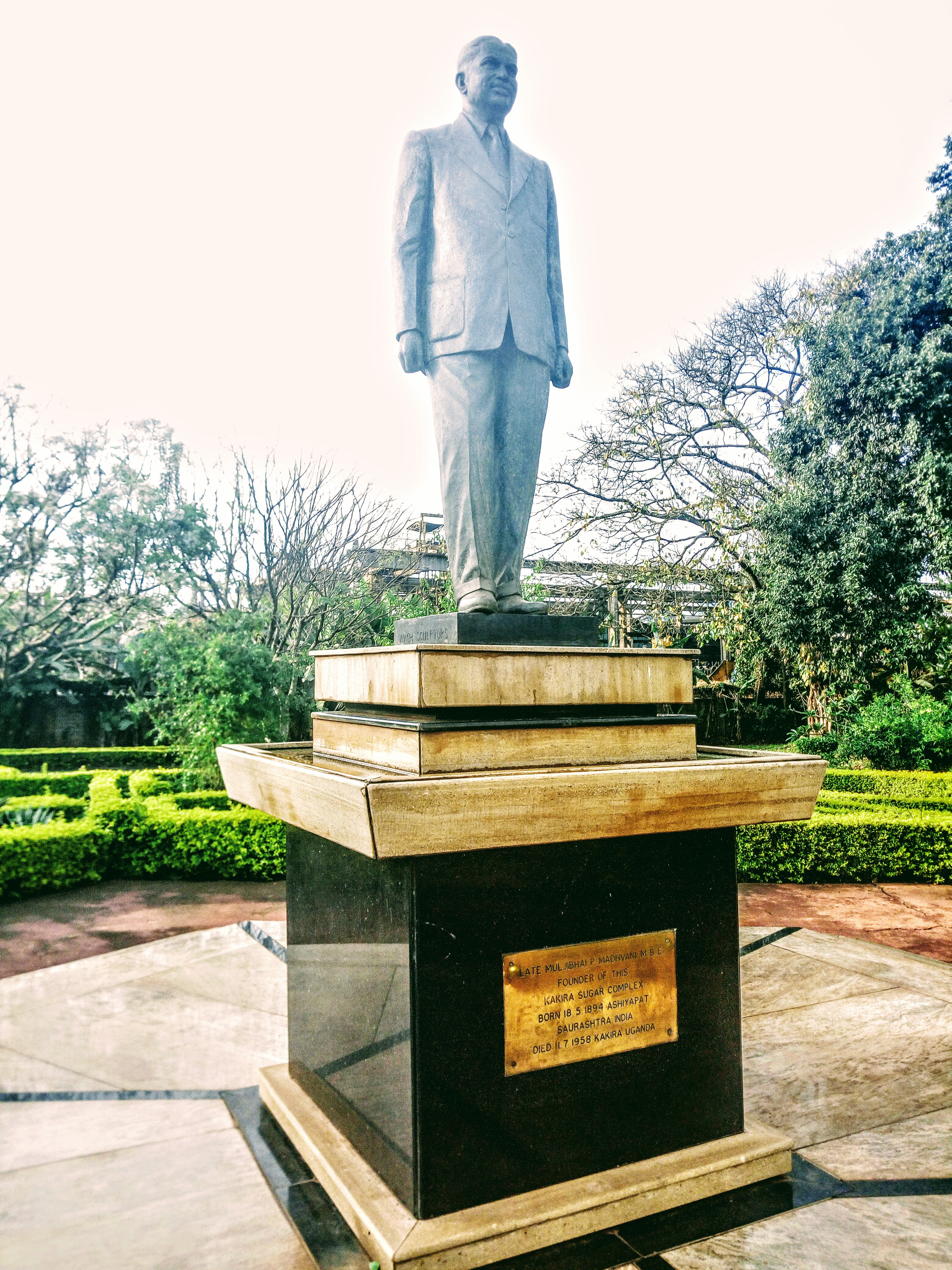
- Company type: Conglomerate
- Industry: Manufacturing, tourism.
- Founded: 1914; 112 years ago
- Headquarters: Kakira, Uganda
- Key people: Muljibhai Madhvani, Jayant Madhvani, Manubhai Madhvani, Pratap Madhvani, Surendra Madhvani, Mayur Madhvani.
- Products: Sugar, Biomass energy, Ethanol, Matches, Packaging, Insurance, Construction, Steel, Tea, Communication, Horticulture, Software, Properties, Hotels and Resorts.
- Number of employees: 10,000+
- Website: madhvanifoundation.com

The Madhvani Group of Companies commonly referred to as the Madhvani Group, is one of the largest conglomerates in Uganda. The group has investments in Kenya, Uganda, Rwanda, South Sudan, Tanzania, the Middle East, India, and North America.

== History ==
In 1912, Muljibhai Madhvani, then aged 18, arrived in Jinja following his older brother Nanjibhai. Starting in 1914, he was able to join his brothers small trading concern and help create a business that would later account for 10 percent of Uganda's gross domestic product. Following the Asian expulsion of 1972 Muljbhai's five sons decided to split parts of the business equally. His workers and their dependents have enjoyed free education, housing, and healthcare under the Group. The Group's businesses are run primarily by Madhvani family members, but many of the newer investments are joint ventures with other businesses.

During the 1970s, the Madhvani family was expelled from Uganda by Idi Amin and their businesses were nationalized and mismanaged to near-extinction. In 1985, the family returned to Uganda and with loans from the World Bank, the East African Development Bank, and the Uganda Development Bank, they resurrected and rehabilitated their businesses and started new ones.

== Muljibhai Madhvani Foundation ==
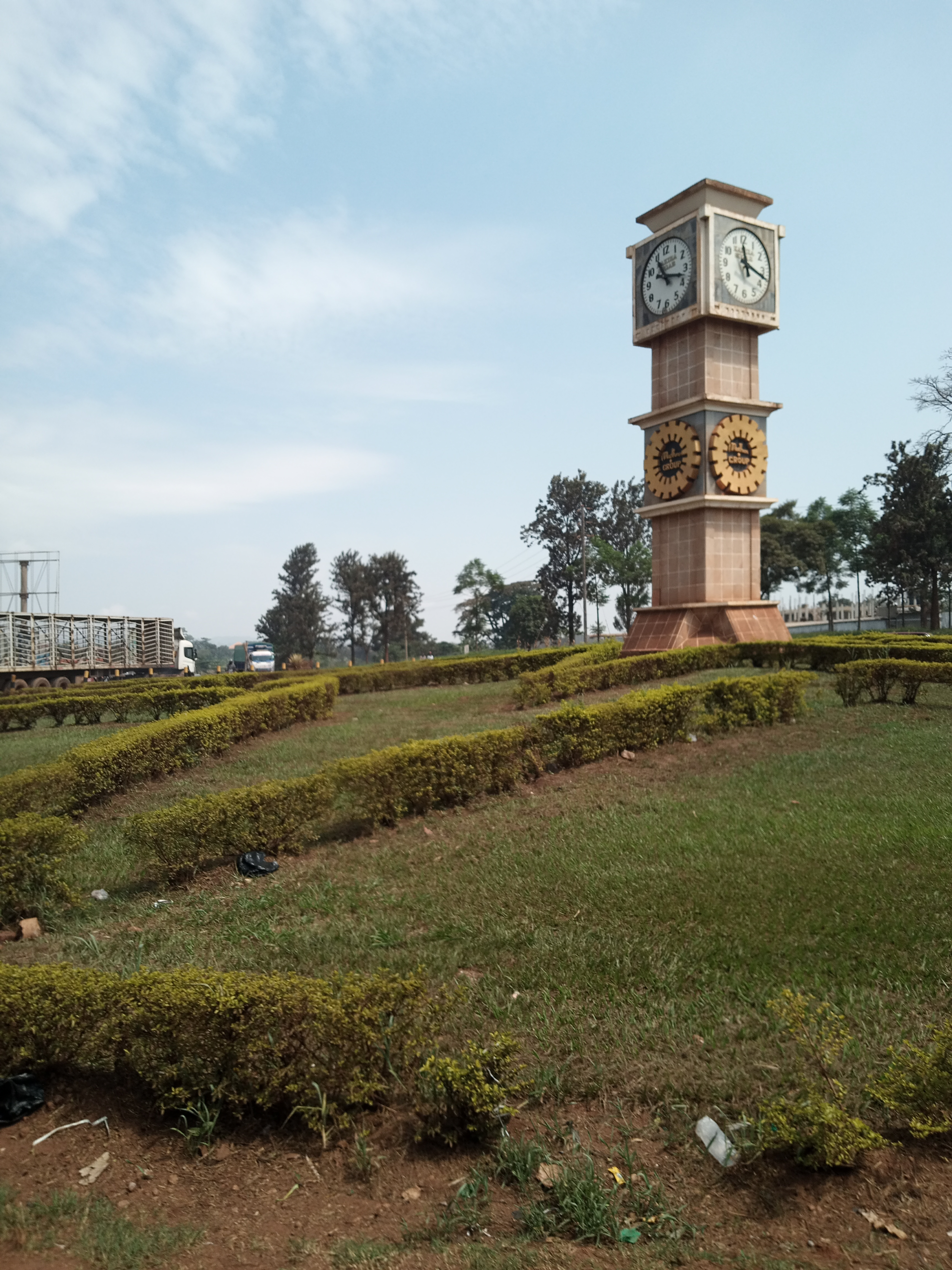
Madhvani Group, post in Jinja

The Muljibhai Madhvani Foundation is a charitable trust that was established in 1962, just before Uganda gained its independence, to honor the vision of Muljibhai Madhvani (14 May 1894 – 11 July 1958). The foundation awards scholarships to deserving undergraduate and postgraduate university students to study in Ugandan universities. One of the foundation's primary objectives is to maintain and promote scientific and technical education among the people of Uganda.

== Subsidiary companies ==
The Madhvani Group includes but is not limited to the following companies:

- Chobe Safari Lodge, Murchison Falls National Park, Uganda
- East African Packaging Solutions, Njeru, Uganda – now sole owner after buying out partner
- East African Distributors Limited – furniture and hardware merchandising, Kampala, Uganda
- East African Glass Works Limited – Defunct
- Excel Construction Limited, Jinja, Uganda and Juba, South Sudan
- East African Underwriters Limited – 51 percent shareholding by Liberty Holdings Limited of South Africa Kampala, Uganda
- Industrial Security Services Limited, Jinja, Uganda
- Kabuye Sugar Works, Kabuye, Rwanda
- Kajjansi Roses Limited, Kajjansi, Wakiso District, Uganda
- Kakira Airport, Kakira, Uganda
- Kakira Power Company, Kakira, Uganda – the owner-operators of Kakira Power Station
- Kakira Sugar Works, Kakira, Uganda – the flagship company of the Group
- Kakira Sugar Works Hospital, Kakira, Uganda
- Silver Back Lodge, Bwindi Forest, Uganda
- Kakira Sweets & Confectioneries Limited, Kakira, Uganda
- Liberty Life Assurance Uganda Limited, Kampala, Uganda
- Madhvani Group Central Purchasing, Jinja, Uganda
- Madhvani Group Projects Limited, Kampala, Uganda
- Madhvani Group Steel Division – Jinja Uganda
- Marasa India Resorts and Hotels, Rajkot, Gujarat, India
- Madhvani Properties Limited, Kampala, Uganda
- Makepasi Match Limited Jinja, Uganda – the largest producers of wax safety matches in Africa
- Marasa Holdings Limited, Kampala, Uganda
- Muljibhai Madhvani Foundation, Kakira, Uganda
- Mwera Tea Estate, Mityana District, Uganda
- Mweya Safari Lodge, Queen Elizabeth National Park, Uganda
- Nakigalala Tea Estate, Wakiso District, Uganda
- Paraa Safari Lodge, Murchison Falls National Park, Uganda
- Premier Safaris Limited, Jinja, Uganda
- Software Applications Uganda Limited, Kampala, Uganda
- Madhvani Group Steel Division, Jinja, Uganda
- TPSC Turbo Prop Service Centre Uganda Limited, Aircraft Maintenance, Kakira, Uganda
- Umabano Hotel – Kigali Rwanda
- Marasa Africa – Holding company for all hotels and safari lodges in Uganda, Kenya and Rwanda.
