= Amos Nzeyi =

Ugandan businessman and Industrialist (born 1947)

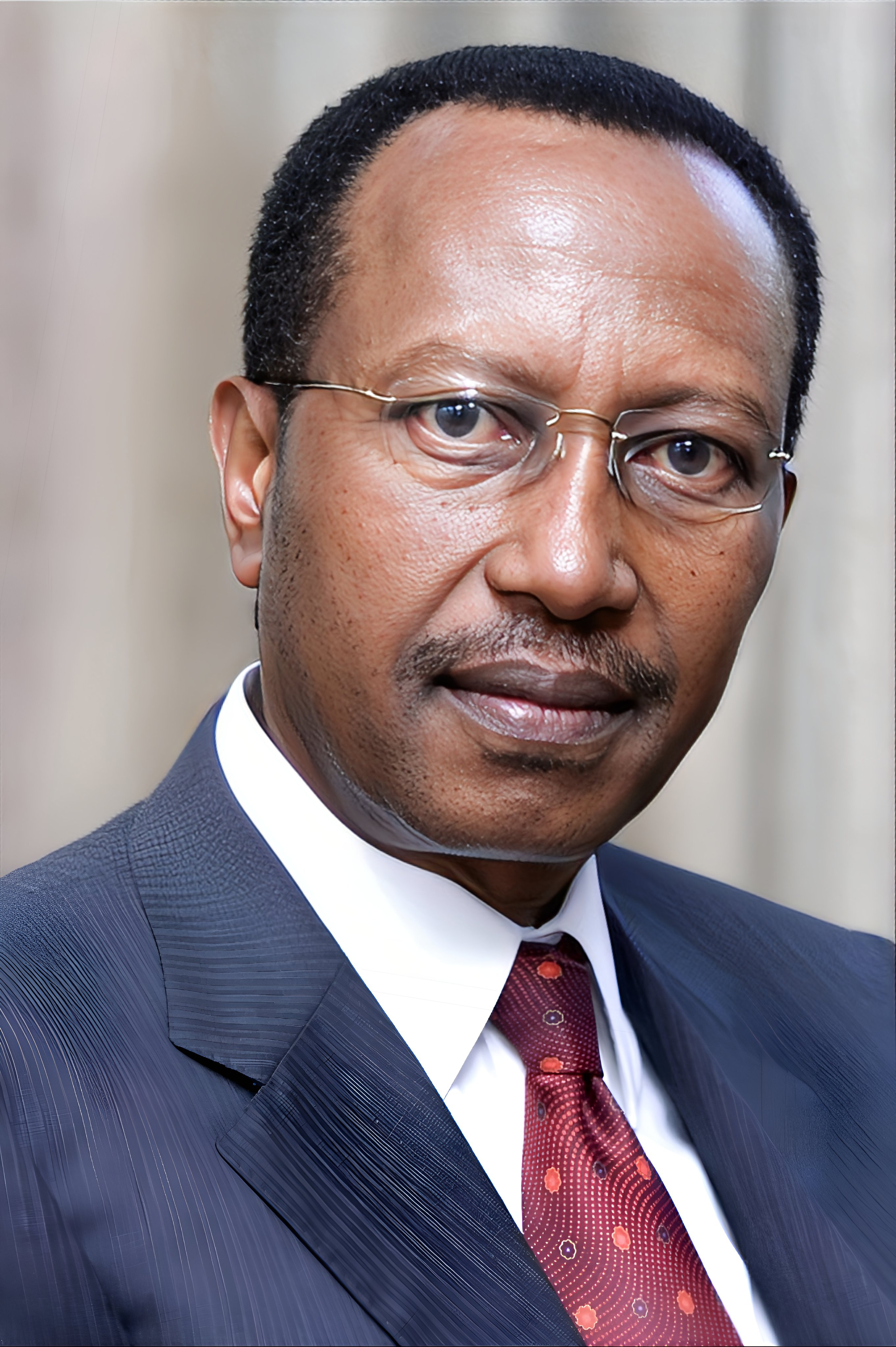
- Dr. Amos Nzeyi in 2016
- Born: 25 December 1947 (age 78); Kabale Hospital, Kabale District, Uganda
- Citizenship: Uganda
- Occupations: Businessman, Industrialist
- Years active: 1967–present
- Known for: PepsiCo Uganda, Hot Loaf Bakery
- Title: Chairman of Crown Beverages Limited
- Children: Humphrey Nzeyi; Arthur Nzeyi; Alex Nzeyi; Andrew Nzeyi

Amos Nzeyi (born 25 December 1947) is a Ugandan businessman, entrepreneur, and industrialist. He is one of the wealthiest people in Uganda.

Nzeyi is the executive chairman of the board of directors at Crown Beverages Limited, the exclusive bottler of PepsiCo products in Uganda. He previously held a 40% share in the National Bank of Commerce until its takeover by Crane Bank in September 2015

Nzeyi has been active in Uganda’s business sector since the 1970s, with interests spanning timber, transport, manufacturing, and food processing. He founded Hot Loaf Bakery in 1986, one of the first major bread producers in Uganda after the National Resistance Movement came to power. In the late 1980s, he established a crown cork manufacturing plant supplying beverage companies across East Africa before securing the PepsiCo bottling franchise for Uganda and co-founding Crown Beverages Limited.

Under Nzeyi’s leadership, Crown Beverages Limited has expanded from producing 18 million cartons of soda annually in 1993 to over 65 million, achieving more than 70% market share in Uganda’s soft drinks sector. The company has received multiple recognitions, including the PepsiCo Europe and Sub-Saharan Africa Bottler of the Year Award (2018), top taxpayer awards from the Uganda Revenue Authority, and several governance and growth accolades from PepsiCo’s Africa, Middle East and South division. Between 2013 and 2018, it remitted UGX 284 billion in taxes, and in 2022 embarked on a USD 90 million plant expansion to increase capacity.

Outside business, Nzeyi is a former competitive rally driver, having participated in regional motorsport events during the 1970s, including a rally organised in 1976 by President Idi Amin to coincide with Uganda’s hosting of the Organisation of African Unity summit, which he won. According to later accounts, the victory drew the attention of the State Research Bureau, prompting him to leave Uganda for exile in Kenya. He later became a golfer and founder of Palm Valley Golf and Country Club.

He is also the Head of Mission and Honorary Consul for the Mauritius Diplomatic Mission and Consulate of Mauritius in Kampala, a position he has held since 2018 when the country established its first representation in Uganda.

== Early life, family background ==
Amos Nzeyi was born on 25 December 1947 at Kabale Hospital, in southwestern Uganda. He is the son of Nathanel Sebugunzu, a herdsman from Bufumbira in present-day Kisoro District, whose life intersected with key historical moments in the precolonial and early colonial development of the Kigezi region.

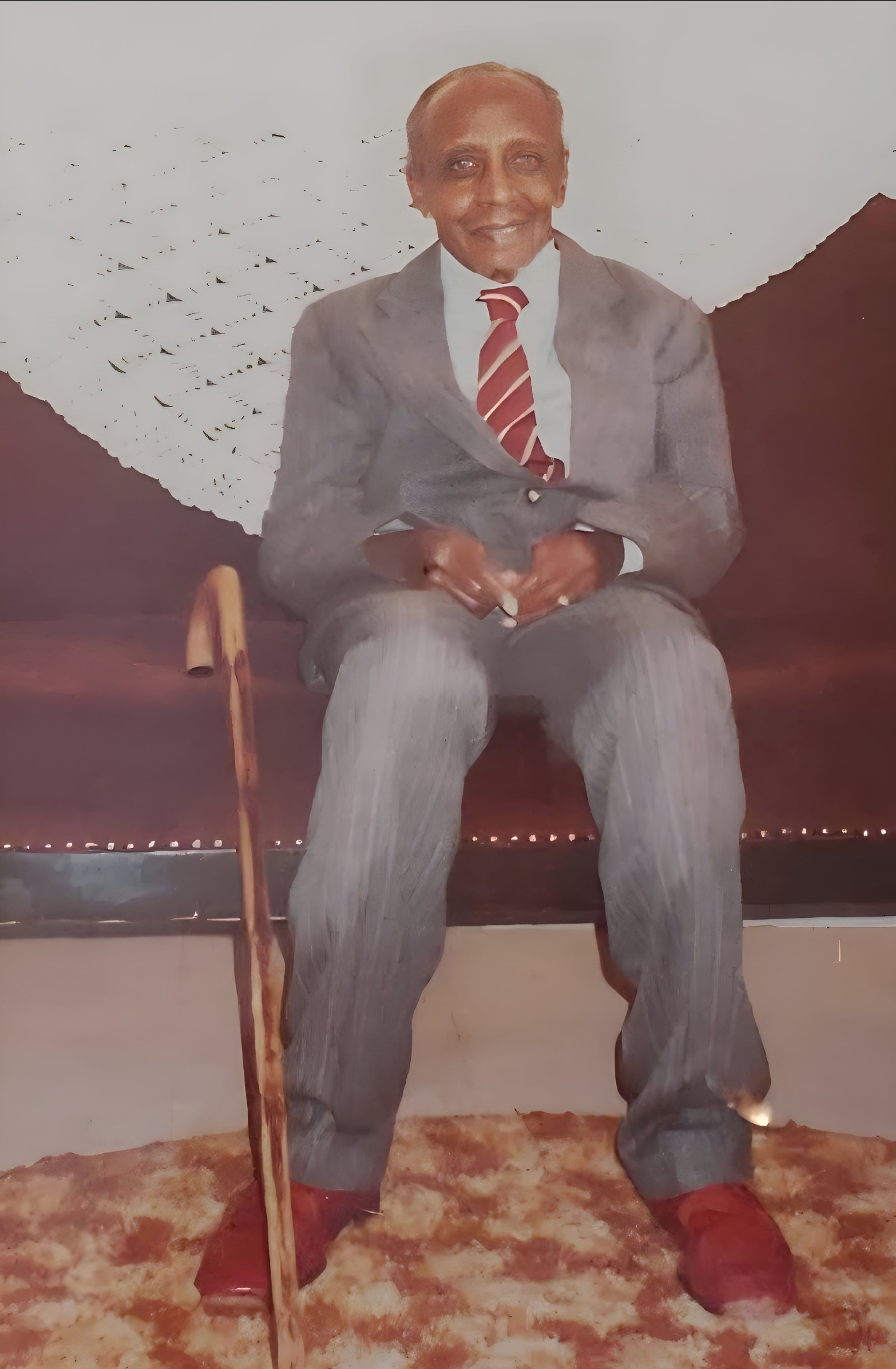
Nathaniel Ssebugunzu, father of businessman Amos Nzeyi, celebrating his 93rd birthday.

Nzeyi’s father, Sebugunzu, was a cattle herder in the Bufumbira hills during the late colonial period. According to oral accounts, while herding, he encountered British missionaries traveling from Rwanda toward Kabale and directed them to a local pond known as Ekigyezi. The missionaries’ mispronunciation of the name is said to have evolved into "Kigezi," later adopted by colonial administrators for the wider region. Sebugunzu subsequently accompanied the missionaries to Kabale, where he was employed at the newly established White Horse Inn. He later introduced his younger brother, Ernesto Binyuku, who went on to serve as a Muruka Chief under the British administration. Family accounts also suggest that Sebugunzu may have been present during an undocumented episode in which Prince Albert Edward (later King Edward VII) was concealed near Lake Bunyonyi. A nearby lake in the region would later named Lake Edward in the prince’s honor, anchoring the area more firmly in British imperial geography.

Years later, Amos Nzeyi would return to Kabale and acquire ownership of the White Horse Inn, the same establishment where his father had once worked. The transition from colonial employment to local ownership symbolized a generational shift in control and legacy.

== Education ==
Amos Nzeyi began his education at Rwere Church School, a small village institution that offered classes up to Primary Three but later expanded and upgraded to become the current day Rwere Primary School. His enrollment followed a decision by his father, Mzee Sebugunzu, after observing his independence and determination. Several of Nzeyi’s classmates at Rwere later became notable public figures, including Amama Mbabazi and Ruhakana Rugunda, who both served as Prime Ministers of Uganda, and Emmanuel Tumusiime-Mutebile, who became Governor of the Bank of Uganda.

Following difficulties in accessing consistent education in Kabale, Nzeyi moved to Kampala in his teenage years with the help of his elder brother, who worked as a ticket examiner with the Uganda Transport Company (UTC). Unable to afford transport, he travelled to the capital in a truck transporting iron ore. The three-day journey exposed him for the first time to tarmac roads and electric streetlights.

In Kampala, Nzeyi enrolled at Kololo Primary School, then regarded as a prestigious institution. He was, however, unable to complete a full term due to financial constraints. His brother subsequently arranged private tutoring for him with an Asian teacher named Patel, who also tutored his brother’s wife. Though informal, this allowed him to continue learning at a basic level.

Before moving to Kampala, Nzeyi had attended multiple other primary schools in Kabale, including, Kikungiri Primary, Muslim Primary, Bubaare Primary, and Kabami Primary. Much of his schooling was funded by extended family, often on the condition that he undertook domestic duties in return, which reduced his classroom attendance and interrupted his studies.

At Lower Kigezi High School, Nzeyi was expelled after being unable to pay school fees and receiving corporal punishment from the headmaster. He later described the experience as formative, shaping his resilience and determination.

Nzeyi did not complete formal schooling, but he continued to seek knowledge through practical experience. He later referred to his early employment with the Works and Roads Department (WRD) as the most formative period of his education, describing it as providing technical skills and work discipline.

He has expressed the view that practical exposure and adaptability can be as important as, or in some cases more important than, formal academic qualifications, emphasizing the importance of continuous learning through experience.

== Business interests ==
Early business ventures

Amos Nzeyi’s first exposure to business came in Kabale, where as a child he raised chickens given to him by his father. He sold eggs to cover part of his school fees, though losses occurred when the family used the chickens to host visitors. He later tried selling eggs to teachers on credit, but the venture collapsed due to salary delays among civil servants. Nzeyi then shifted to selling small baked goods known as Mwana Akaba scones to fellow students, a cash-based business that proved more successful. These early experiences taught him lessons in cash flow, customer reliability, and resilience.

After multiple interruptions to his schooling in Kabale, Nzeyi moved to Kampala with help from his brother. He briefly attended Kololo Primary School but soon relied on private tutoring due to financial constraints. During this period, Nzeyi turned to informal trading, including selling tetracycline antibiotics, popularly called "double colour" to truck drivers. Though ethically questionable, the business gave him his first independent income in the city.

At 14, Nzeyi secured his first formal job with Water Resources Development (WRD), an Israeli firm constructing the Kabale-Ntungamo road. Starting as a mechanic’s assistant, he quickly advanced to support the chief engineer and later managed fuel depots. He worked on large projects including the Mbarara-Katunguru road before resigning after three years to pursue entrepreneurship. Using savings from WRD, Nzeyi returned to Kabale and entered the food supply business, providing produce to hospitals and schools. His major breakthrough came in timber, where he purchased logs from Mafuga Forest and supplied them to urban projects in Kampala, including ministers’ residences in Ntinda, Communication House, and Nakasongola Barracks. His reliability won him repeat contracts, and he invested in trucks to transport his own goods.

Disruption under Idi Amin

Nzeyi’s transport fleet was seized during Idi Amin’s regime in the early 1970s, prompting him to relocate operations to Mombasa, Kenya. There, with the mentorship of businessman Gregory Karureta, he expanded into regional transport, running fleets across Kenya, Rwanda, Burundi, and the Democratic Republic of Congo while maintaining smaller operations in Uganda.

Motorsport and Exile

In the mid-1970s, Nzeyi gained prominence as a rally driver, competing alongside Arthur Brick, Paddy Brick, Hajji Jjunju, and others, and winning several competitions. In 1976, during the Organisation of African Unity (OAU) Summit hosted in Uganda under President Idi Amin’s chairmanship, a 6,000-kilometre rally was organized across East Africa. The route extended through Uganda, Sudan (now South Sudan), Zaire (later renamed the Democratic Republic of the Congo in 1997), Rwanda, Burundi, parts of Tanzania, and Kenya. Driving a Datsun 180B SSS modified by Janspeed in London, Nzeyi won the event, a victory broadcast live nationwide. Following his success, he was briefly detained by the regime’s security services and subsequently fled into exile in Kenya.

While in Nairobi, Nzeyi registered Intercontinental Transport Company and expanded into logistics, eventually managing a fleet of over 200 trucks. He also invested in real estate. In 1980, he briefly returned to Uganda during elections but was detained and released before fleeing again. His Nairobi home became a hub for exiled Ugandan politicians linked to Yoweri Museveni’s National Resistance Movement (NRM). Increasing political pressure later forced him to relocate to the Seychelles and subsequently the United Kingdom.

Return to Uganda and Hot Loaf Bakery

After the NRM took power in 1986, Nzeyi returned to Uganda and founded Hot Loaf Bakery, introducing large-scale bread production at a time when most bread was imported from Kenya. The bakery became one of the country’s first post-war food industries and remains operational decades later.

Crown Beverages Limited

In the early 1990s, Nzeyi partnered with PepsiCo to establish Crown Beverages Limited after acquiring the privatized Lake Victoria Bottling Company. He worked with business partners Dan Kigozi and Christopher Kayoboke to modernize production and expand distribution. The company became PepsiCo’s exclusive bottler in Uganda, growing to produce over 100 million cases annually. In 2018, PepsiCo CEO Indra Nooyi visited Uganda to mark the company’s 25th anniversary after Crown Beverages had acquired over 53% of the soft drinks market in the country. By 2025, Crown Beverages was employing tens of thousands directly and indirectly, contributing significantly to government tax revenue.

Nzeyi has owned the following businesses wholly or in part:

- Crown Beverages Limited – A bottler of Pepsi products. As of April 2013, he was chairman of the board and part-owner.
- Hot Loaf Bakery – A bakery in Kampala, Uganda. He is the owner and chairman of the board.
- White Horse Inn – A hotel in Kabale, Uganda. As of April 2015, he was the proprietor.
- Nandos Restaurant – A fast-food restaurant in the centre of Kampala, which Nzeyi formerly co-owned.
- National Bank of Commerce – A small commercial bank, founded in 1991 by private investors, since closed by the Bank of Uganda.
- Innscor Uganda Limited – Operating in the food and beverages sector, focusing on light manufacturing and retail.
- Palm Valley Golf Course – A golf and leisure facility in Uganda. It features an 18-hole golf course together with training and practice areas, and is equipped with a clubhouse that hosts social and recreational activities.

== Other responsibilities ==
Besides his personal business interests, Nzeyi has had the following public, fiduciary responsibilities:

- He is a former member of the board of directors of the Uganda Development Bank.
- Nzeyi is the former chairman of the Uganda Manufacturers' Association. He was elected to a second and final two-year term in May 2015.
- Dr. Amos Nzeyi is Honorary Consul for Mauritius in Kampala, Uganda. The Consulate of Mauritius is the first representation of Mauritius in Uganda established in 2018 following the appointment of Dr Amos Nzeyi as the Honorary Consul.
- He is a Trustee of the Uganda Golf and former president of Uganda Golf Union

== Temangalo land transaction and NBCU closure ==
Temangalo land sale

In 2008, Amos Nzeyi was involved in the sale of land located in Temangalo, Wakiso District, which later became a subject of public controversy. The National Social Security Fund (NSSF) purchased 100 acres of land from Nzeyi at a rate of UGX 24 million per acre, following valuation and negotiations. At the time, he had reportedly received higher offers from other private investors, including real estate developer Anatoli Kamugisha, who offered UGX 29 million per acre for a larger parcel.

Nzeyi defended the transaction as a fair market deal, arguing that the NSSF was not overcharged and that the land was sold below its potential market value due to his need for urgent capital. Critics raised concerns about conflict of interest and transparency, though subsequent investigations did not conclusively prove impropriety.

Court clears Nzeyi

In 2016, Temangalo Tea Estate, a company owned by the family of Muhammad Hassanali Moosa, sued the National Social Security Fund and Amos Nzeyi, seeking to repossess 366 acres of the Temangalo land, claiming it belonged to them. In 2019, the Land Division of the High Court dismissed the case with costs. Justice John Eudes Keitirima ruled that the matter had been filed beyond the statutory time limit, regardless of the merits of the claims. Records indicated that Mr. Nzeyi sold the Temangalo land to NSSF in 2009 after having acquired it in 1988 with the intention of developing a dairy farm. He purchased the property in phases from Abbas Mawanda, the former managing director of Uganda Development Bank. Nzeyi was cleared of any wrongdoing in the acquisition and ownership of the land.

National Bank of Commerce Uganda (NBCU)

The proceeds from the Temangalo transaction, approximately UGX 11 billion, were deposited into the National Bank of Commerce Uganda (NBCU), a commercial bank in which Nzeyi held a significant stake. According to Nzeyi, this injection of capital was part of efforts to meet the Bank of Uganda's (BoU) capitalization requirements. An additional UGX 3 billion was raised through a loan from Tropical Bank.

Despite reportedly meeting the required UGX 15 billion capitalization threshold, NBCU was closed by BoU on 27 September 2012. According to Nzeyi’s account, a final sum of USD 3 million was transferred through Commercial Bank of Africa to BoU the day before the closure deadline. However, BoU questioned the origin of the funds and proceeded to shut down the bank, citing regulatory concerns. The closure involved a rapid operation by security personnel, including reported involvement of armed operatives. The bank’s assets and data were seized, and operations ceased immediately. A parliamentary investigation by the Committee on Commissions, Statutory Authorities and State Enterprises (COSASE) later found that NBCU was solvent at the time of closure, raising further questions about the regulatory motivations behind the decision.

The Temangalo and NBCU matters remain subjects of public debate in Uganda. While Nzeyi attributes the controversies to political manipulation and misinformation, others have called for greater regulatory transparency and judicial accountability.

== Personal interests and sporting life ==
Transition from squash to golf

During his years in Uganda and exile in Kenya, Nzeyi actively participated in squash, often playing with prominent Ugandan personalities such as former Attorney General William Byaruhanga, Prof. George Mondo Kagonyera, and Geoffrey Rugazoora. He maintained his passion for squash until the late 1990s.

His shift to golf reportedly began during a PepsiCo centenary celebration held in Hawaii in 1998, where he was invited to play alongside figures such as PepsiCo Chairman Western Lincoln, Denis Thatcher (husband of former British Prime Minister Margaret Thatcher), and former U.S. President George H. W. Bush. Although he had no prior experience with golf at the time, this encounter sparked his interest in the sport.

Following this event, Nzeyi purchased his first golf equipment and began playing regularly. Upon returning to Uganda, he deepened his involvement in the sport and later established the Palm Valley Golf and Country Club, a private facility that has hosted numerous tournaments.

International golf engagements

Nzeyi's participation in golf expanded to international circles over the years. He credits connections with figures such as Adele Zaluwin, then Vice President of Golf in Dubai, for enabling him to play alongside top global golfers. He is reported to have taken part in the 2015 Omega Dubai Desert Classic Pro-Am, where he played with athletes including Rory McIlroy, Sergio García, Ángel Cabrera, and Tiger Woods.

According to Nzeyi, golf evolved from a hobby into a networking and development platform, contributing to his social and business engagements.

Business philosophy

Nzeyi places high value on human capital as the cornerstone of business success, above factors like capital or infrastructure. He regularly emphasized this in strategic leadership retreats, including one held at Imperial Resort Hotel in Entebbe. Participants in these sessions included top Ugandan economists such as: Prof. Emmanuel Tumusiime-Mutebile (then Governor of Bank of Uganda), Godfrey Tumusiime (former CEO, East African Development Bank), Johnny Kiruzu (ex-KPMG Uganda Head), Mary Gumisiriza (Ministry of Finance).

The consensus from these gatherings highlighted leadership and people management as critical to sustainable business growth.

In his companies, including HotLoaf Bakery, Nzeyi embraced a decentralized leadership model. He appointed an experienced CEO as both a shareholder and director, a move he credits for maintaining business stability during his periods of absence.

Faith and social responsibility

Nzeyi has publicly attributed his personal and professional endurance to his Christian faith. He identifies four principles integrity, energy, intelligence, and spirituality, as foundational to his life and work, echoing sentiments often associated with Warren Buffett’s business ethics.

Amos Nzeyi is a noted advocate of corporate social responsibility (CSR), regarding it not only as a moral duty but also as a personal and spiritual commitment. His philanthropic work spans several sectors, including education, healthcare, and youth mentorship, particularly within the Kigezi region of Uganda. Through the Dr. Amos Nzeyi Foundation, he has supported disadvantaged students with high academic potential by providing educational sponsorships.

Nzeyi’s approach to philanthropy is shaped by personal experiences, including challenges faced during his early life and the health struggles of his son. These events have played a central role in motivating his involvement in social development efforts. His initiatives aim to improve access to basic services and create opportunities for vulnerable populations.
