= Tumubweine Twinemanzi =

Ugandan economist

- Born: Uganda
- Education: University of Texas, Dallas (Economics, M.S., Ph.D.); University of Florida
- Occupations: Economist, Central Banker
- Years active: 2000—present
- Title: Executive Director of the Bank Supervision Directorate at the Bank of Uganda

Tumubweine Twinemanzi, is a Ugandan economist and central banker who, effective 7 February 2018, serves as the Executive Director of the Bank Supervision Directorate of the Bank of Uganda, the country's central bank and national banking regulator.

Prior to his appointment to his current position, he served as the Director of Industry Affairs and Content (Economic Affairs) at the Uganda Communications Commission (UCC).

== Background and education ==
Twinemanzi was born in Kabale District, Uganda, into an affluent family. His father, Ephraim Manzi Tumubweine, was a former Member of Parliament for Rukiga County (present-day Rukiga District). Manzi also served as Uganda's State Minister of Privatization. Twinemanzi's mother, Christine Nyarubona, hails from the Bunyoro sub-region.

Twinemanzi, obtained a Doctor of Philosophy degree in Economics from the University of Texas at Dallas, awarded in 2009. He also holds other academic qualifications from the Public Utility Regulation Center at the University of Florida at Gainesville.

== Work experience ==
At the time of his appointment to head the bank supervision directorate at the Bank of Uganda, Dr Twinemanzi had over 15 years of experience in middle and senior management. He was replaced at UCC by Julianne Mweheire.

In his new position at Bank of Uganda, he has participated in the parliamentary inquiry into the closure of seven Ugandan commercial banks between 1993 and 2017.

== Other considerations ==
Twinemanzi plays golf and serves as the chairman of Entebbe Golf Club, in the lakeside town of Entebbe.

== See also ==
- Emmanuel Tumusiime-Mutebile
- Louis Kasekende
- Mathias Katamba
