= Charles Kikonyogo Nyonyintono =

Charles Nyonyintono Kikonyogo
- Born: Charles Nyonyintono Kikonyogo; Bukuya village, Mubende District, Uganda
- Died: May 2000; Mulago Hospital, Kampala, Uganda
- Other name: Charles N. Kikonyogo
- Education: Makerere University; Royal College Nairobi; North Carolina University; Brandeis University (BA, Political Science, 1964); New York University (MPA, 1965); University of Chicago (Postgraduate studies in Economics)
- Occupations: Economist, Banker
- Years active: 1967–2000
- Employer: Bank of Uganda
- Known for: Governor of the Bank of Uganda
- Title: Governor of the Bank of Uganda
- Term: 1979; 1990–2000
- Spouse: Florence Bakanansa
- Children: 4

Charles Kikonyogo Nyonyintono also known as Charles N. Kikonyogo was a Ugandan economist and banker. He served as the governor of the Bank of Uganda, the central bank of Uganda.

== Early life and educational background ==
Kikonyogo was born in Bukuya village to Samuel Balagadde. Kikonyogo went to Bukuya Primary School and finished primary six in 1949. After that, in 1950 to 1952, he studied at Makerere College. In 1953, he attended Ndejje Junior School, where he did well and won a scholarship to study at King's College Budo. At King's College Budo, he took part in music and sang in the Nightingale Choir.

For his further studies, Kikonyogo attended Royal College Nairobi and later won a scholarship to study at the North Carolina Universityin the Universities. He later moved to Brandeis University in Boston, where he completed a Bachelor of Arts in Political Science in 1964. He went ahead to complete a Master's degree in Public Administration at New York University. In addition to these, he also studied economics at Makerere University in Uganda and later did postgraduate studies in economics at the University of Chicago in the United States.

== Career ==
Kikonyogo worked as a teacher at Bishop School in Mukono early in his life after finishing his studies. In August 1967, he began his career at the Bank of Uganda, where he first worked as a banking officer under Governor Joseph Mary Mubiru. He later became Deputy Governor of the Bank of Uganda and in 1979, he was appointed Governor of the Bank of Uganda, a role he held until the regime of Idi Amin was overthrown.

Kikonyogo moved to Nairobi in June 1980, where the World Bank recognized his work and recommended him for the position of Governor of the Bank of Botswana and he served in Botswana from 1981 to 1987. He returned to Uganda in 1987 where he worked as Managing Director at Spear Motors and Nile Bank. In 1990, he was appointed Governor of the Bank of Uganda again, a position he held until his retirement in 2000.

== Death ==
Kikonyogo retired in January 2000 and passed away five months later from cancer at Mulago Hospital.

== Personal life ==
Kikonyogo was married to Florence Bakanansa, and together they had four children: Dr. Alexandria Kulubya, Edwin Balagadde, Richard Sserunkuuma, and Elizabeth Nalugya.

== Honorary ==
The Charles Nyonyintono Kikonyogo Money Museum, commonly called the C.N. Kikonyogo Money Museum, was named in honor of Charles Nyonyintono Kikonyogo and was officially opened on August 15, 2006. The Capital Markets Authority established the Kikonyogo Capital Markets Award to honor the late Bank of Uganda governor, Charles Nyonyintono Kikonyogo.

During the 40th anniversary celebration of Ndejje Junior School, a foundation stone was laid on a new dormitory for 200 girls to honor Charles Nyonyintono Kikonyogo.

== See also ==
- Governor of the Bank of Uganda
- Emmanuel Tumusiime-Mutebile
- Joseph Mary Mubiru
