= Ezra Suruma =

Ugandan economist, politician and academic

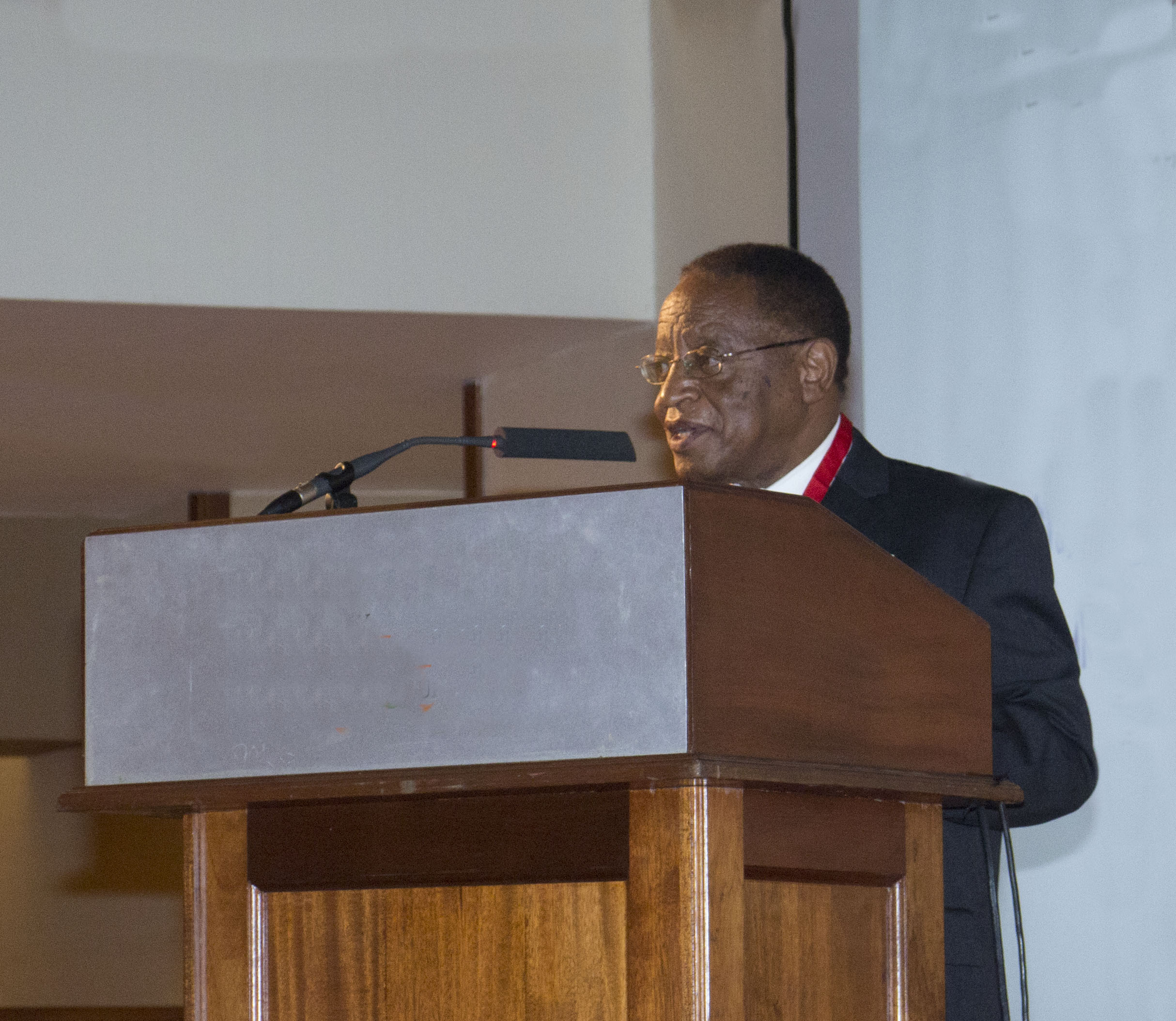
- Born: November 11, 1945 (age 80); Uganda
- Citizenship: Uganda
- Education: Fordham University (Bachelor of Science in Finance) (Master of Arts in Economics); Undisclosed University (Master of Science in Computer Science); Undisclosed University (Master of Science in International Banking); University of Connecticut (Doctor of Philosophy in Economics)
- Occupation: Economist
- Years active: 1980—present
- Known for: Economics
- Title: Chancellor of Makerere University
- Spouse: Mrs. Suruma

Ezra Suruma (born 11 November 1945) is a Ugandan economist, banker, and academician.

He became the chancellor of Makerere University in January 2016. He formerly served as a senior adviser to the president of Uganda on finance and economic planning, a position he held from 16 February 2009 until 15 January 2016.

He served as the deputy governor of the Bank of Uganda from 1990 until 1993.

Previously, he was a visiting fellow at the Brookings Institution, in Washington, D. C., at the Africa Growth Initiative division of the institution. He was appointed to that position in April 2010.

== Background and education ==
He was born in Kabale District in 1945. He holds a Bachelor of Science in finance from Fordham University in New York City, obtained in 1969. His Master of Arts degree in economics was obtained in 1972, also from Fordham University. His Doctor of Philosophy in economics was obtained in 1976 from the University of Connecticut. He also has a master's degree in computer science and one in international banking.

== Career ==
Before entering government service and the private sector, Suruma was a professor of economics and management at Makerere University and at Florida A&M University.

In 1987, he joined the Bank of Uganda, the country's central bank, as the director of research, serving in that capacity until 1990. From 1990 until 1993, he served as the deputy governor of the Bank of Uganda. In 1993, he left that position and joined the Uganda Commercial Bank as the chairman and managing director, serving in that capacity until 1996.

In 2005, he was appointed minister of finance, planning and economic development. He served in that capacity until 16 February 2009, when he was appointed senior presidential adviser on finance and economic planning. The international banking magazine The Banker chose Suruma to receive the "Best Finance Minister of Africa Award" for 2008.

During his time as minister of finance, he was a strong promoter of Uganda's banking industry and was instrumental in the planning and initiation of Uganda's micro finance project that helps small farmers and businesses obtain low interest loans.

== Personal details ==
Suruma is married and has four children, the eldest from his first marriage, and one grandchild. He is also raising the orphaned children of his two younger brothers. He was a shareholder in the National Bank of Commerce (Uganda) (NCBU), and was a director of the bank.

NBCU was a small indigenous commercial bank that was closed by the Bank of Uganda on 27 September 2012. In 2011, Suruma and other investors started UGAFODE Microfinance Limited, a Tier III, deposit-taking microfinance institution, supervised by the Bank of Uganda.

== See also ==
- Emmanuel Tumusiime-Mutebile
- Michael Atingi-Ego
