= Adam Mugume =

Ugandan economist

- Education: Makerere University (BA, Economics); University of Botswana (MA, Economics); University of Oxford (PhD, Economics)
- Occupation: Central banker
- Years active: 2011–present
- Known for: Economics
- Title: Acting Deputy Governor and Director of Research of the Bank of Uganda
- Spouse: Virginia Mugume
- Children: 3

Adam Mugume is a Ugandan economist who serves as the Director of Research and Policy at Bank of Uganda, a position he has occupied since 2011. From 27 March 2020 until 3 August 2020, Dr Mugume served as the Deputy Governor of the Bank of Uganda, the country's central bank, in acting capacity, before Michael Atingi-Ego, the substantive Deputy Governor took up office.

== Education ==
Mugume holds the degree of Bachelor of Arts (BA) in Economics from Makerere University. His Master of Arts (MA) degree in Economics was obtained from the University of Botswana in Gaborone. His Doctor of Philosophy (PhD) degree, in Economics, was awarded by the University of Oxford in the United Kingdom.

== Career ==
Adam Mugume served as the head of the department of Economic Theory and Analysis at Makerere University. He taught econometrics, considered to be the hardest course unit, by those whom he taught. He is an expert in economic forecasting and policy analysis. His other areas of specialisation include macroeconomics, applied econometrics, and fiscal and monetary policies.

== Other considerations ==
In January 2020, the employment contract of Louis Kasekende, the Deputy Governor of the Bank of Uganda from 2010 until 2020 expired, after two consecutive 5-year terms. The contract was not renewed by the head of state; the appointing authority. So Kasekende left the central bank.

On 27 March 2020, two months after the position fell vacant, the board of directors of the central bank, headed by its chairman, appointed Mugume to serve as Deputy Governor of the central bank, until a substantive appointee is named by the president of Uganda.

Two days later, the president of Uganda, named Michael Atingi-Ego as the new substantive Deputy Governor of Bank of Uganda. Atingi-Ego was confirmed by Parliament on 16 April 2020. However, due to the Covid-19 travel restrictions, he has not yet traveled from Zimbabwe to Uganda to take up his appointment, so Mugume is the acting Deputy Governor as of June 2020.

== See also ==
- Louis Kasekende
- Emmanuel Tumusiime-Mutebile
- Michael Atingi-Ego
