= Harriet Magala =

Ugandan lawyer

- Born: 1970 (age 55–56); Uganda
- Citizenship: Uganda
- Education: Makerere University (Bachelor of Laws); Law Development Centre (Diploma in Legal Practice); East African School of Taxation; Diploma in Taxation and Accounting
- Occupations: Lawyer, Legal mediator
- Years active: 1993 — present
- Known for: Law
- Title: Lawyer and Court-Approved Legal Mediator

Harriet Magala is a Ugandan lawyer and Court-Approved Legal Mediator in the Judiciary of Uganda. She also concurrently serves as a partner in the law firm of Kituuma-Magala & Company Advocates, a business that she co-owns with her father, Grace Kituuma Magala, also a lawyer.

== Background and education ==
She was born in the Central Region of Uganda. Her father is Grace Kituuma Magala, a Kampala-based lawyer, who is also her partner in their law firm and in other investments. She holds a Bachelor of Laws degree, obtained from Makerere University, in Kampala, Uganda's capital and largest city. She obtained her Diploma in Legal Practice from the Law Development Centre, also in Kampala. She also has a Diploma in taxation and accounting obtained from the East African School of Taxation.

== Career ==
Harriet Magala is a partner with her father Grace Kituuma Magala, and co-owner of Magala-Kituuma & Company Advocates, a law firm based in Kampala. The duo have other joint businesses that they co-own. They have represented individuals and companies in the past, including DFCU Bank, a large Ugandan commercial bank. She is also a court-approved legal mediator, who sits down with willing clients to settle their grievances out of court. If the two parties are happy with the outcome, they then register the results with the relevant court and the results become binding. If the parties are not satisfied, then they can proceed to plead their case before a judge.

The Uganda Commercial Court initially selected Attorney Harriet Magala to mediate between the Bank of Uganda and Sudhir Ruparelia in the matter of Crane Bank, which was seized by the Bank of Uganda and sold o DFCU Bank in January 2017. However, the parties preferred a different mediator and agreed on Judge Yorokamu Banwine to mediate their legal and financial differences.
