= Obel =

Obel may refer to:

== People with the surname ==
- Agnes Obel (born 1980), Danish singer, songwriter, and musician
- Arthur Obel (1948 or 1949 – 2025), Kenyan scientist
- Geoffrey Onegi Obel (born 1955), Ugandan economist and politician
- Henrik Frode Obel (1942–2014), Danish businessman, after whom the Obel Award for architecture is named
- Onegi Obel (1932–2008), Ugandan economist and politician and adviser to the President of Uganda

== Others uses ==
- 10057 L'Obel, a main-belt asteroid
- Obel River, a small tributary to the Mareb River whose headwaters are in the Eritrean Highlands on the border between Eritrea and Ethiopia
- Obel Tower, a building in Belfast, Northern Ireland
