= Anthony Ochaya =

Ugandan politician

- Born: 25 December 1932; Atiak, Amuru, Uganda
- Died: 6 July 1998 (aged 65); Mulago Hospital, Kampala, Uganda
- Resting place: Agwe, Gulu District, Uganda
- Occupation: Politician
- Political party: Democratic Party (Uganda), Uganda National Liberation Front, Nationalist Liberal Party

Anthony Ochaya (25 December 1932 – 6 July 1998) was a Ugandan politician and economist. He was the Minister of Planning and Economic Development under the Ugandan National Liberation Front government and was also commissioner for economic affairs at the World Bank.

== Early life and education ==
=== Early life ===
Anthony Ochaya was born in the town of Atiak, in the Amuru District of Northern Uganda on 25 December 1932.

=== Education ===
Anthony Ochaya began his education at St. Joseph's Primary School, in Gulu, Uganda. He then matriculated on to St. Joseph's Secondary School, again in Gulu, Uganda. Afterwards, he attended St. Aloysisus College Nyapea in Zombo, Uganda from 1952 until 1955, and then he began working for his Bachelor of Arts in 1956 from Makerere University in Kampala, Uganda, and graduated from Makerere University in 1956.

== Career ==
=== Early career ===
After graduating from Makerere University in 1956, Anthony Ochaya worked as a civil servant in a variety of low-level positions. He first worked as an assistant district commissioner in the Moyo District in Northern Uganda, a position he held until 1960. He then worked as an administrative officer for the Independence Celebrations Office based in Kampala, before transferring to work as an administrative officer in the Office of the Chief Minister of the Uganda Protectorate under Chief Minister Benedicto Kiwanuka from 1960 until 1962. In 1962, the position of Chief Minister of the Uganda Protectorate was renamed to the Prime Minister of the Uganda Protectorate, but Anthony Ochaya's position and role in the office of Prime Minister Benedicto Kiwanuka stayed the same despite the position's name change in the lead up to the Independence of Uganda from the United Kingdom.

Under the first Milton Obote administration, Anthony Ochaya held various medium-level positions in the newly independent nation of Uganda. In 1962, he became the Assistant Secretary for the Ministry of Finance. In 1963, he worked in the Ministry of Finance, before being appointed the Principal Assistant Secretary for the Ministry of Health in 1964. He worked as the Principal Assistant Secretary for the Ministry of Health for one year before moving into the Ministry of Planning and Community Development as the Principal Assistant Secretary in 1965. He then returned to the Ministry of Finance, being promoted to the role of Under Secretary in 1966.

=== Career at the World Bank ===
In 1966, Ochaya left Uganda and moved to the District of Columbia in the United States of America to take a position at the Economic Development Institute at the World Bank. He worked in the Philippines Division of the World Bank afterwards, a position he held until 1979 when he returned to Uganda.

=== Return to Uganda ===
While abroad working at the World Bank in the District of Columbia, Ochaya began getting involved with the Uganda National Liberation Front, a group of predominantly exiled prominent Ugandans who opposed the regime of Ugandan President Idi Amin and who sought to remove Idi Amin from power and then to establish immediately an interim civilian government. When the Uganda National Liberation Front took provisional control of the Government of Uganda in 1979, Anthony Ochaya returned to the Ministry of Planning and Economic Development, this time being appointed as Minister of Planning and Economic Development by the Uganda National Liberation Front government.

As Minister of Planning and Economic Development, Ochaya repeatedly clashed with newly appointed Governor of the Bank of Uganda, Gideon Nkojo. One issue that particularly divided them was the issue of inflation. Ochaya wanted scholars from Makerere University to conduct an academic study of inflation in Uganda before making any changes to economic policy, while Nkojo wanted to immediately combat the "economic and social malaise" of Uganda, believing that would solve the inflation problem. Ultimately, the Minister of Finance mediated the dispute and attempted an economic restructuring of Uganda to combat inflation, in the process expanding the jurisdiction that the Bank of Uganda had on the Ugandan economy.

In 1984, Ochaya founded the Nationalist Liberal Party alongside Tiberio Okeny Atwoma, Cuthbert Joseph Obwangor, and Francis Bwengye. The Nationalist Liberalist Party was a splinter group from the leading opposition party at the time, the Democratic Party. The Nationalist Liberal Party was created in response to former acting Secretary General of the Democratic Party Tiberio Okeny Atwoma's unsuccessful challenge to Paul Kawanga Ssemogerere for the leadership of the Democratic Party (Uganda).

Anthony Ochaya assumed the role of Secretary General for the Nationalist Liberal Party upon its creation. The party was short-lived, and eventually was absorbed back into the Democratic Party by 1986 with Okeny ultimately rejoining the Democratic Party of Uganda.

== Personal life ==
During the Uganda Tanzania War between Uganda and Tanzania, there was a massacre of civilians in Arua, in the Northern Region of Uganda. A number of civil servants and some families sought protection from the fighting in the hall of the White Rhino Tourist Hotel, where they were massacred. Anthony Ochaya and fellow minister Moses Apiliga who led the Ministry of Supplies, both had "a number of relatives" who were killed in the attack.

== Death ==
Anthony Ochaya was admitted into Mulago Hospital in Kampala, Uganda on 24 June 1998, on suspicion of pneumonia and Kidney disease. He died on 6 July 1998. He is buried in Agwe, a village near Gulu, Uganda.
