= Joseph Mary Mubiru =

Ugandan economist (1929–1972)

- Born: 29 January 1929; Kalungu district, Uganda
- Education: University of Kerala , Southern India Bachelor of Science in Economics; New York University Master of Arts degree in Economics
- Occupations: Economist and Central Banker
- Years active: 1966–1971
- Known for: Economics, fiscal discipline
- Title: Governor, Bank of Uganda

Joseph Mary Mubiru (born 29 January 1929) was a Ugandan economist and banker. He served as the governor of the Bank of Uganda, the central bank of Uganda in 1966.

== Early life and educational background ==
Mubiru was born on 29 January 1929 in Kalungu sub-county (then part of Masaka district, now Kalungu district) to Maria Alibayagadde and Yakobo Zake. He began his education at Villa Maria Primary School from 1938 to 1943, continued at Bukalasa Secondary School, and later studied at St. Thomas Major Seminary Katigondo between 1951 and 1952.

After leaving the seminary, Mubiru worked with the National Bank of India before earning a scholarship to study at the University of Kerala in Southern India, where he completed a Bachelor of Arts (Honors) degree in Economics from 1954 to 1959. He then pursued graduate studies at New York University in the United States, obtaining a Master of Arts degree in Economics between 1959 and 1962.

== Career ==
In 1963, Mubiru was engaged by the United Nations Economic Commission for Africa (UNECA) and then served as assistant secretary to the Committee of Nine tasked with establishing the African Development Bank between 1963 and 1964. He returned to Uganda in 1964 and was appointed General Manager of the Uganda Credit and Savings Bank (UCSB), before its transformation into the Uganda Commercial Bank.

After the government reorganised the Uganda Credit and Savings Bank into a state‑owned commercial institution in 1965, Mubiru was appointed its first Managing Director. He later chaired the committee charged with setting up Uganda’s central bank and, when the Bank of Uganda was established in 1966, Mubiru became its first Governor.

While serving as Governor of the Bank of Uganda, Mubiru was appointed a Fellow of the Institute of Bankers in London and of the International Bankers Association in Washington. He was also one of the founding members of the Uganda Institute of Bankers.

Mubiru remained Governor of the Bank of Uganda until August 1971 when his contract came to an end. After leaving the central bank, he took up a senior position with the Madhvani Group of Companies. In 1972, while still with the Madhvani Group, Mubiru was appointed as an Advisor to the African Department of the International Monetary Fund (IMF), although he never assumed the post due to his subsequent disappearance and death.

== Death ==
During the regime of Idi Amin, Mubiru was accused of financial misconduct thus being abducted and murdered in 1972.

== Personal life ==
Mubiru was married to Teopista Mubiru, and together they had four children.

== Honorary ==
Mubiru was honoured by the Bank of Uganda through an annual memorial lecture series in his name.

== See also ==
- Emmanuel Tumusiime-Mutebile
- Charles Kikonyogo Nyonyintono
