= Ochaya (surname) =

Ochaya is a surname. Notable people with the surname include:

- Anthony Ochaya (1932–1998), Ugandan politician
- Joseph Ochaya (born 1993), Ugandan footballer
