= Geoffrey Onegi Obel =

Ugandan politician

Geoffrey Alan Onegi Obel
- Born: 20 October 1955 (age 70); Uganda
- Died: 18 October 2026 (aged 70); Nairobi, Kenya
- Occupation: Investment Banker
- Known for: Finance
- Title: Founder, Uganda Securities Exchange
- Father: Angelo Onegi Obel

Geoffrey Alan Onegi Obel (20 October 1955 – 18 October 2026) was a Ugandan investment banker. He was the founder of the Uganda Securities Exchange and of UAP Old Mutual Financial Services Uganda Limited, a subsidiary of the Nairobi-based financial services conglomerate, UAP Old Mutual Holdings. From 2001 until 2005, he served as the Chairman of NSSF Uganda.

== Background and education ==
He was born in Uganda in 1955. His father was Ugandan economist and politician Onegi Obel (1932–2008), who served as the Deputy Governor of the Bank of Uganda from 1968 until 1973 and was the Governor of the Bank of Uganda from 1973 until 1978. He studied Economics at university obtaining both the degrees of Bachelor of Arts in Economics and Master of Arts in Economics.

== Career ==
In 2001, he was appointed Chairman of Uganda's National Social Security Fund (NSSF). In 2003 he spoke out about "how cash is the missing ingredient in the recipe for the country's economic development" in reference to the Ugandan economy relying on donor funding and taxes derived from imports. Under the NSSF, Obel attempted to raise foreign investment and advance the regulation of the Bank of Uganda to improve national savings. His efforts towards developing the economy and infrastructure of Uganda and corporate interests has often led to conflict and in 2006, for instance, he was involved in a legal battle over the construction of a bridge which jeopardized the livelihoods of local farmers.

After he left the NSSF, he became the director of UAP Financial Services Uganda Limited, a subsidiary of UAP Holdings, whose shares are traded over the counter, pending listing on the Nairobi Stock Exchange.

== Controversy ==
In 2003, while still the Chairman of NSSF Uganda, he floated a special purpose vehicle called Premier Developments Limited, a 50–50 joint venture between NSSF Uganda and Mugoya Estates Limited. NSSF's contribution was 400 acres (160 ha) of land. The project was cancelled by government and charges were brought against Geoffrey Onegi Obel and others. The case was dismissed, but government prosecutors re-filed it a second time. He was cleared of all charges because he was able to prove in court that he followed all relevant protocols, including getting clearance from the Minister of Finance, as required by the law. The land that was procured in 2004, had, by 2014, doubled in value to USh 16,000,000,000.

== Death ==
Geoffrey Alan Onegi Obel died at MP Shah Hospital in Nairobi, Kenya, where he had been admitted. He was 70.
