= Julianne Mweheire =

- Born: 1975 (age 50–51); Uganda
- Citizenship: Uganda
- Education: Undisclosed University (BA in Economics, Accounting and Business Management); Stevens Institute of Technology (MSc in Telecommunications Management)
- Occupations: Telecommunications Manager, Accountant, Business Administrator
- Years active: 2000 — present
- Known for: Administrative Skills, Technical Expertise
- Title: Director of Content Development and Industry Affairs at the Uganda Communications Commission

Julianne Rwakakoko Mweheire (née Julianne Rwakakoko), commonly known as Julianne Mweheire, is a Ugandan management professional, accountant and corporate executive. She serves as the Director of Content Development and Industry Affairs at the Uganda Communications Commission, effective August 2018. She previously worked as a Senior Manager, Carrier Relations and a Senior Accountant, Interconnection and Roaming, at MTN Uganda.

== Background and education ==
She was born in Ntungamo District, in the Western Region of Uganda, to Elly Rwakakoko, a former Director-General of the Uganda Revenue Authority.

She started her early Education at Kitante Primary School in Kampala. She holds a Bachelor of Arts degree in Business Management, Economics and Accounting. Later, she graduated from the Stevens Institute of Technology, in New Jersey, United States, with a Master of Science degree in Telecommunications Management.

== Work experience ==
For a period of nearly twenty years, starting in 2000, Julianne worked in various positions, including as a Senior Manager and as a Senior Accountant, at MTN Uganda, the largest mobile network operator in that East African country.

Upon her appointment to her current position, she replaced Tumubweine Twinemanzi, who was appointed Executive Director of Bank Supervision at Bank of Uganda, Uganda's central bank.
