= National Bank of Commerce (Uganda) =

- Company type: Private
- Industry: Financial services
- Founded: 1991
- Headquarters: Yusuf Lule Road, Kampala, Uganda
- Key people: Mathew Rukikaire; Chairman
- Products: Loans, Checking, Savings, Investments
- Total assets: US$20 million (2008)

National Bank of Commerce (Uganda) (NBCU) was a commercial bank in Uganda.

== Overview ==
The bank provides banking services to individuals and to small and medium business enterprises. As of April 2009, the bank was the 22nd largest commercial bank in Uganda with an estimated asset valuation of approximately US$20 million or slightly more than 0.25% of all bank assets in the country.

== History ==
The bank was formed in 1991, and was named Kigezi Bank of Commerce, with a mission to provide banking services and inexpensive loans to the Kigezi Community. During the mid-1990s, the Gidoomals, a family of Asian descent and Kenyan citizenship acquired 86% shareholding in the bank. In April 2008, the Gidoomal brothers sold their shares to Amos Nzeyi, Amama Mbabazi and Ruhakana Rugunda. The three, together with former Ugandan Finance Minister, Ezra Suruma, are shareholders and Directors of the bank. In July 2011, Emirates Link, an Abu Dhabi investment company, acquired shareholding in NBCU. Ugandan media reports indicated the bank will begin offering Islamic banking later in 2011.

== Ownership ==
As of August 2010, the three largest investors in the bank were Nzeyi, Mbabazi and Rugunda. The three owned 86% of the bank between them. The remaining 14% was owned by 320 other investors who included Ezra Suruma, Jim Muhwezi and retired Supreme Court Justice George Wilson Kanyeihamba. In 2008, there were press reports of a pending merger or sale of the bank, but those plans fell through. In October 2009, the investors from Abu Dhabi, invested US$10 million in the bank, without assuming ownership.

In July 2011, the Bank of Uganda approved the purchase of up to 49% of the stock of the bank by the Abu Dhabi investment company Emirates Link, owned by Ahmed Darwish Almarar, who became Chairman of NBCU. The remaining shareholding is still being worked out at this time. In October 2011, following the cash injection of Shs12 billion (approx. US$4.5 million) by the Middle-Eastern investors, shareholding in the bank is now as depicted in the table below:

National Bank of Commerce (Uganda) Ownership
Rank	Name of Owner	Percentage Ownership
1	Emirates Link of Abu Dhabi	25.00
2	Amos Nzeyi	
3	Amama Mbabazi	
4	Ruhakana Rugunda	
5	260+ Other Investors	
	Total	100.0

== Dispute ==
There is an ownership dispute among shareholders in the stock of the bank. Minority shareholders have filed a lawsuit challenging the authority of the three largest shareholders. At the same time, the three shareholders are facing legal challenges from the Middle Eastern investors who are dissatisfied with the pace of handover to them as the new majority shareholders. Meanwhile, the Bank of Uganda, the national banking regulator has appointed a special advisor to NBCU, to advise the bank on its affairs during this period of instability within NBCU. In May 2012, the Ugandan Commercial Court directed the bank to appoint a new board of directors and to proceed with recapitalization, in order to stay solvent.

== Branch network ==
National Bank of Commerce (Uganda) has its headquarters on Yusuf Lule Road, in Uganda's capital, Kampala. The full list of the bank's networked branches includes the following location:

1. Yusuf Lule Branch – Yusuf Lule Road, Kampala Main Branch
2. Parliament Avenue Branch – 13A Parliament Avenue, Kampala
3. Kabale Branch – 131 Kabale Road, Kabale

== Governance ==
The bank is governed by a board of directors. In October 2009, Amos Nzeyi stepped down from the post of chairman of the board, a post he had held since 1992. Ahmed Dagher then served as chairman from October 2009 until July 2011. Ahmed Darwish Almarar, one of the non-Executive Directors, is the Chairman of the Board, effective July 2011. In October 2011, Ugandan media reported that Mathew Rukikaire was the Chairman of NBCU at that time.

== Revocation of license and dissolution ==
On 27 September 2012, the Bank of Uganda, the Central Bank and national banking regulator, revoked the banking license of National Bank of Commerce (Uganda). The deposits and branches of NBCU were taken over by Crane Bank, as administrator, on behalf of Bank of Uganda. Immediate steps were initiated to wind up the affairs of NBCU.

On 27 September, Bank of Uganda revoked the license of the National Bank of Commerce (U) Limited and ordered the winding up of its affairs under Sections 17(f), 89(2)(f) & (7)(c) and 99(1) of the Financial Institutions Act 2004. This is according to, a press statement, dated 28 September 2012, issued by Deputy Governor Bank of Uganda.

On 28 September, the Constitutional Court of Uganda sitting at Kampala issued an interim order Misc application No:38 of 2012 for Constitution petition No 44 of 2012 of Humphrey Nzeyi (Petitioner/Applicant) versus Bank of Uganda and Attorney General (jointly respondents), against the actions of the Bank of Uganda. This order restrains them from implementing the order to wind up the affairs of National Bank of Commerce (U) Ltd until the case is heard.

== See also ==
- List of banks in Uganda
- Banking in Uganda
