= Henry Kajura =

Ugandan politician (born 1934)

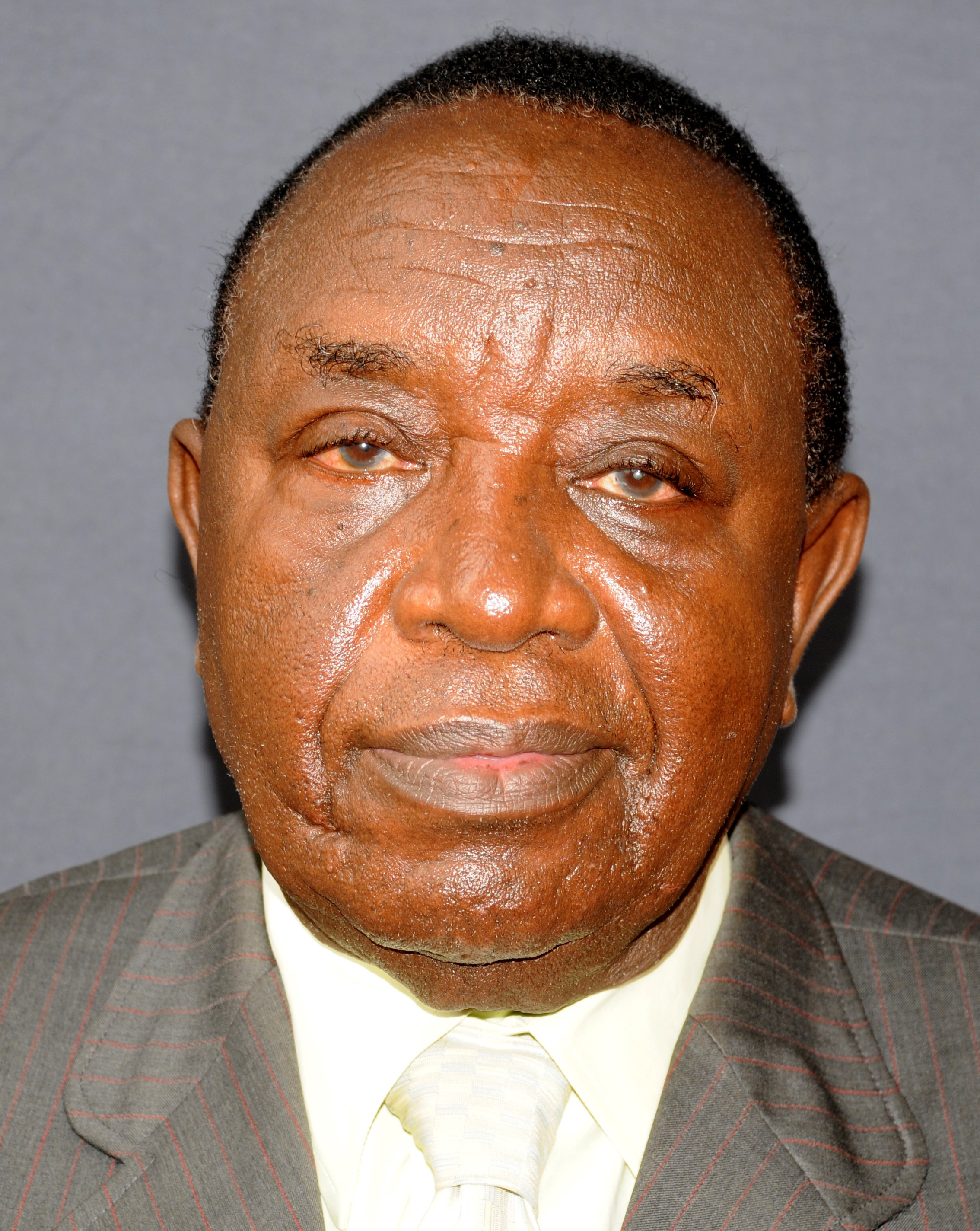
- Born: 7 July 1934 (age 92); Uganda Protectorate
- Citizenship: Uganda
- Education: Makerere University (Bachelor of Arts)
- Occupation: Politician
- Years active: 1966 — present
- Known for: Politics

Henry Muganwa Kajura (born 7 July 1934), commonly known as Henry Kajura, is a Ugandan administrator and politician. Until 2016 he served as the First Deputy Prime Minister and Minister of Public Service in the Cabinet of Uganda.

== Background and education ==
Kajura was born on 7 July 1934 in Masindi, Bunyoro-Kitara, and attended St Mary's College Kisubi. He holds the degree of Bachelor of Arts (BA), from Makerere University, awarded when Uganda's oldest university was still affiliated with the University of London. He also has postgraduate qualifications in Administration, from Oxford University in the United Kingdom and in Management from the University of Wisconsin–Madison in the United States.

== Career ==
From its inception in 1967 until 1973, Kajura served as Secretary of the East African Development Bank. From 1973 until 1978, during the Idi Amin regime, he served as the chairman and managing director of Uganda Commercial Bank, the precursor to Stanbic Bank Uganda. He then served briefly as Governor of the Bank of Uganda from September 1978 until February 1979, being preceded in that role by Onegi Obel and succeeded by Charles Kikonyogo.

From 1978 until 1989, Kajura served as the Chairman of Local Council V (LC V), for Hoima District. He was appointed Minister of Trade & Industry, Natural Resources, Water & Mineral Development in 1989, serving in that capacity until 1998. Between 1998 and 2001, he served as Minister of Water, Lands & the Environment, after Trade & Industry was split off to form a separate ministry. He was appointed Third Deputy Prime Minister in 2002, serving in that capacity until 2005 when he was appointed Second Deputy Prime Minister and Minister for Public Service. In the cabinet reshuffle of May 2009, and that of 27 May 2011, he retained both his cabinet positions, being promoted to First Deputy Prime Minister in 2013. Kajura was a member of Uganda's Cabinet, continuously from 1989 until 2016.

Kajura served as Member of Parliament for Bugahya County on behalf of the National Resistance Movement (NRM) from 1989 until 2006 (losing in the NRM primary to William Rwembera) and for Hoima Municipality from 2011 to 2016, when he lost in the NRM primary to Lawrence Bategeka. In the eighth Parliament (2011–16) he served an ex-officio Member of Parliament, on account of his cabinet appointment. In February 2017 Kajura was appointed the Bunyoro Omukama’s advisor on palace affairs by Solomon Gafabusa Iguru.

== See also ==
- Parliament of Uganda
- Cabinet of Uganda
- Hoima District
