= Michael Atingi-Ego =

Ugandan economist (born 1965)

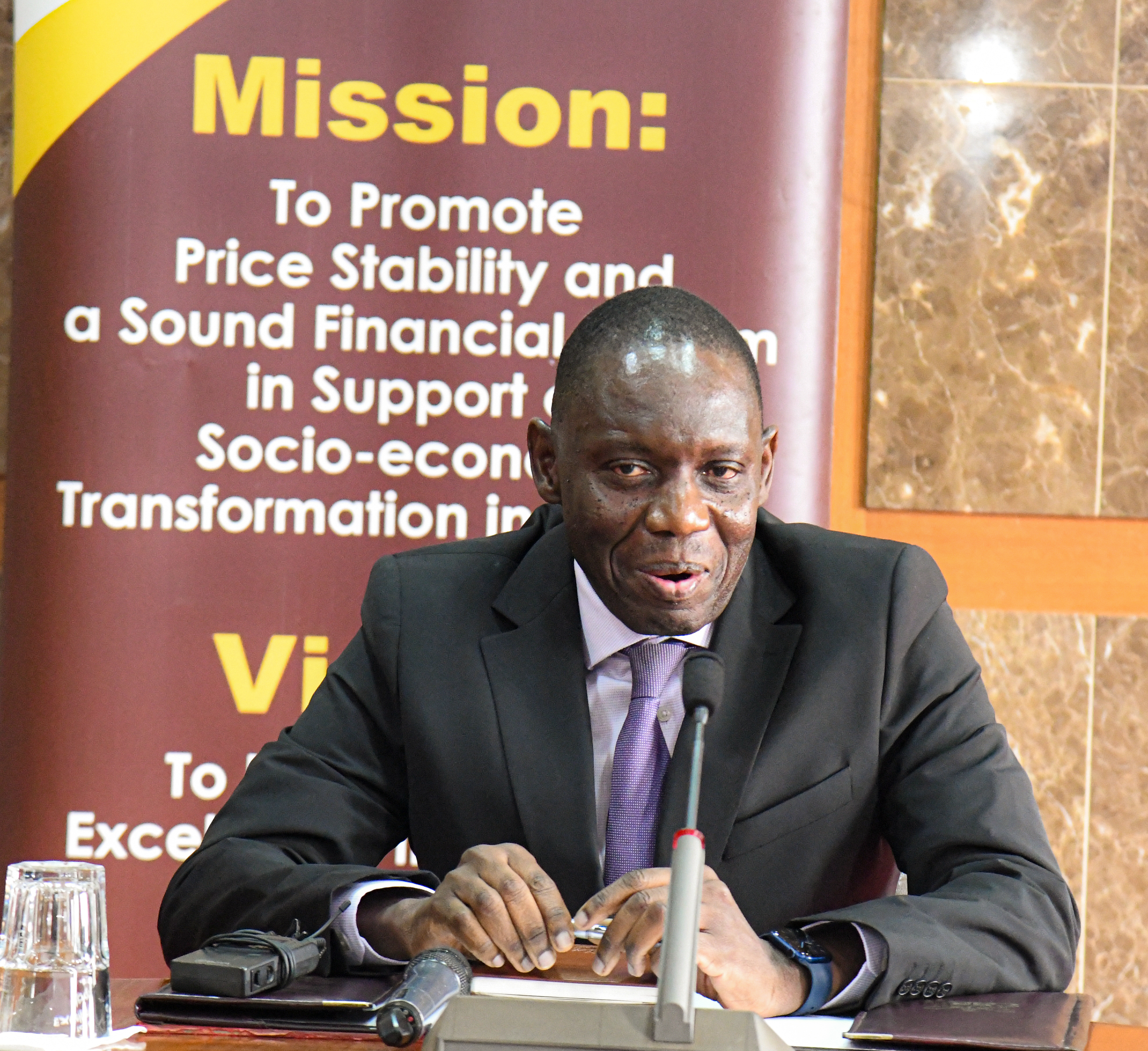
- Born: 1965 (age 60–61); Sovereign State of Uganda
- Citizenship: Uganda
- Occupation: Economist
- Years active: 1990 — present
- Title: Governor of the Bank of Uganda

Michael Atingi-Ego (born 1965) is a Ugandan economist, who was appointed Governor of the Bank of Uganda, on 10 February 2025. At the time of his appointment, he served as the Deputy Governor Bank of Uganda and previously, as executive director of the Macroeconomics and Financial Management Institute of Eastern and Southern Africa (MEFMI), based in Harare, Zimbabwe.

After Emmanuel Tumusiime-Mutebile died in 2022, Atingi-Ego led the Bank of Uganda in an acting capacity until his appointment as governor in February 2025.

== Background and education ==
Atingi-Ego was born in Uganda. He attended local primary and secondary schools. He holds a bachelor's degree in Economics from Makerere University, Uganda's oldest and largest public university. His degree of Master of Arts in Economics was awarded by the Cardiff Business School, in the United Kingdom (UK). His Doctor of Philosophy degree, also in Economics, was obtained from the University of Liverpool, also in the UK.

== Career ==
He started out at the Bank of Uganda. He rose through the ranks to become the executive director, of Research. In 2008, he took up an assignment with the International Monetary Fund (IMF) as deputy director of the African Department (AFR), based in Washington, DC. In September 2018, he was appointed as executive director at MEFMI.

After vetting by the Parliament, he replaced Louis Kasekende, whose 10-year term at the central bank ended in January 2020. Dr Atingi-Ego assumed office as Deputy Governor of Bank of Uganda, on 3 August 2020.

== Other considerations ==
Atingi-Ego is credited with bringing a wealth of regional and international experience to his new office as Deputy Governor of the Bank of Uganda. While at the IMF, he contributed to IMF work on increasing effectiveness of capacity development and in modernising monetary policy frameworks in developing countries.

In May 2022, Atingi-Ego was recognized by African Banker Magazine as the "Central Bank Governor Of The Year", in recognition of his efforts to tame inflation and maintain foreign exchange stability in Uganda.

== See also ==
- Economy of Uganda
- Adam Mugume
