= Governor of the Bank of Uganda =

Chief executive officer of the Bank of Uganda

The Governor of the Bank of Uganda is the chief executive officer and the chairman of the board of directors of the Bank of Uganda. The last governor was Emmanuel Tumusiime-Mutebile, who was first appointed to this position on 1 January 2001, and was re-appointed for a second five-year term on 1 January 2006. In November 2010, he was re-appointed for a third five-year term, effective 12 January 2011. In December 2015, he was re-appointed for a fourth five-year term, effective 12 January 2016. At the start of 2023, Mutebile succumbed to an undisclosed condition, which has made the position vacant ever since. With the president avoiding talks and questions about the appointment of a new governor, the position has been vacant for close to two years now.

== Appointment ==
The Bank of Uganda Act stipulates that the governor and deputy governor of the Bank of Uganda shall be appointed by the President of Uganda with the consent of the Cabinet. The governor and deputy governor shall be appointed for a period of five years and shall be eligible for reappointment. The act further stipulates that the governor and deputy governor shall not, while in office, take up any other office or employment, whether paid or unpaid. It is a requirement that both the governor and deputy governor shall be individuals with recognised financial or banking experience.

== Responsibilities ==
The responsibilities of the Governor of the Bank of Uganda include the following:

- Acting as the supervisor of the bank's staff, assigning duties, and receiving and acting on reports from the staff.
- Convening and presiding over the meetings of the bank's board of directors.

== Governors of the Bank of Uganda (Year 1966 to present) ==
The following individuals have served as "Governor of the Bank of Uganda", since the institution was founded in 1966.

Name	In office
Joseph Mary Mubiru	July 1966 – September 1971
Moses Ssemyano Kiingi	September 1971 – September 1973
Onegi Obel	September 1973 – September 1978
Henry Kajura	October 1978 – April 1979
Charles Kikonyogo	April – May 1979
Gideon Nkojo	May 1979 – April 1981
Leo Kibirango	May 1981 – December 1986
Suleiman Kiggundu	December 1986 – April 1990
Charles Kikonyogo	May 1990 – May 2000
Emmanuel Tumusiime-Mutebile	January 2001 – January 2022
Michael Atingi-Ego	January 2022 – Date

== See also ==
- Bank of Uganda
- Louis Kasekende
