= Kenyan shilling =

Currency of Kenya

Shilingi ya Kenya (Swahili)
- 100/= Kenyan Shillings Banknote

ISO 4217
- Code: KES (numeric: 404)
- Subunit: 0.01

Units of account
- Base unit: Shilling
- Plural: Shillings
- Subunit
- 1/100: cent

Denominations
- Banknotes: 50/=, 100/=, 200/=, 500/=, 1,000/=
- Coins: 1/=, 5/=, 10/=, 20/=

Demographics
- Date of introduction: 1966
- User(s): Kenya

Issuance
- Central bank: Central Bank of Kenya
- Website: www.centralbank.go.ke

Valuation
- Inflation: 4.3%
- Source: Kenya National Bureau of Statistics, as of July 2024.

The Kenyan shilling (Swahili: shilingi; abbreviation: KSh; ISO code: KES) is the currency of Kenya. It is divided into 100 cents. The Central Bank of Kenya Act cap 491, mandated the printing and minting of the Kenyan currency.

== Notation ==
Prices in the Kenyan shilling are written in the form of x/y, where x is the amount in shillings, while y is the amount in cents. An equals sign or hyphen represents zero amount. For example, 50 cents is written as "-/50" and 100 shillings as "100/=" or "100/‑". Sometimes the abbreviation KSh is prefixed for distinction. If the amount is written using words as well as numerals, only the prefix is used (e.g. KSh 10 million).

This pattern was modelled on sterling's pre-decimal notation, in which amounts were written in some combination of pounds (£), shillings (s), and pence (d, for denarius). In that notation, amounts under a pound were notated only in shillings and pence.

== History ==
The Kenyan shilling replaced the East African shilling in 1966 at par.

=== Coins ===
10 cents (1980).
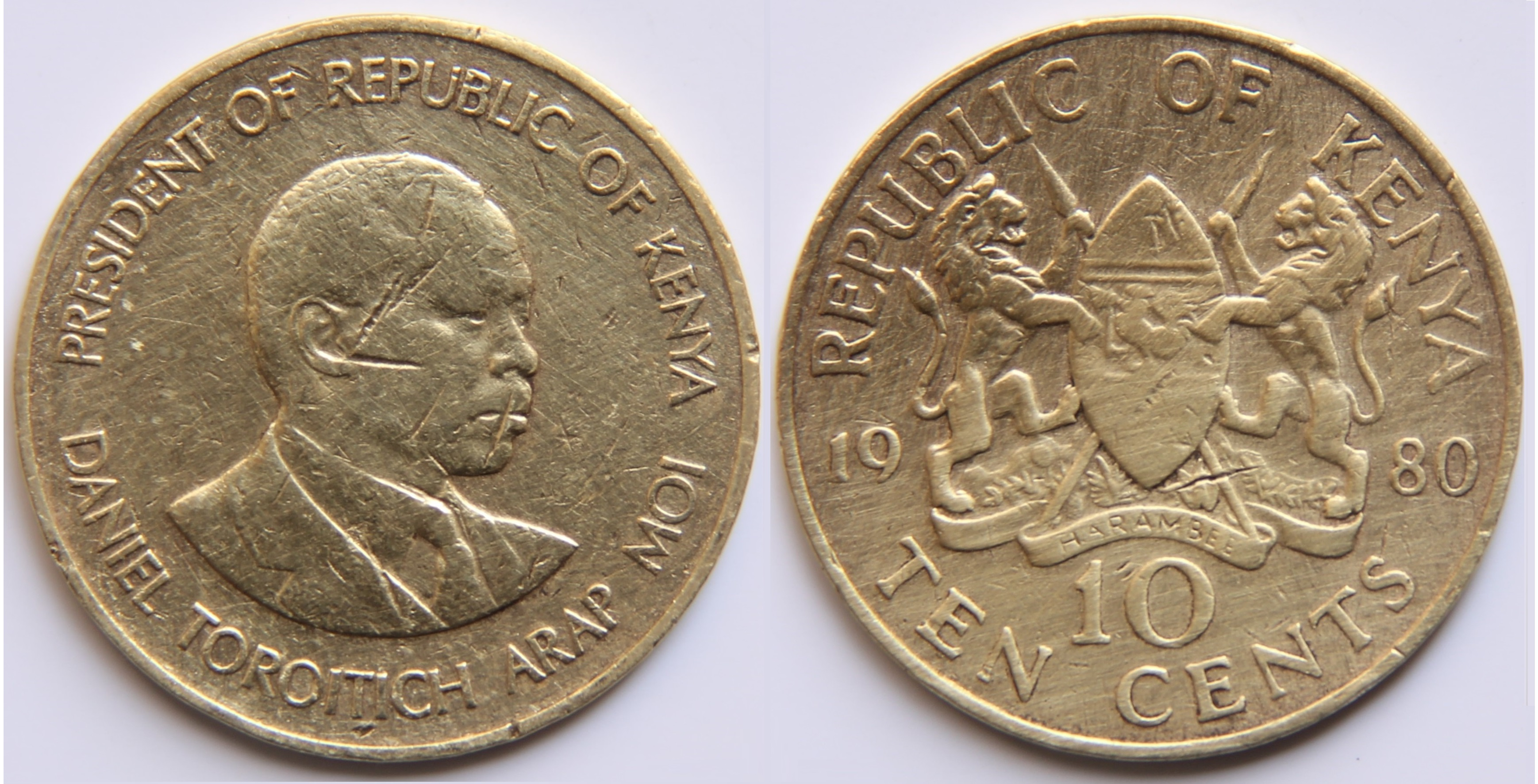
First side of the image: Obverse: Bust of Daniel arap Moi with lettering "PRESIDENT OF REPUBLIC OF KENYA DANIEL TOROITICH ARAP MOI".
Second side of the image: Reverse: Face-value, year, Coat of arms of Kenya and country name.

The first coins were issued in 1966 in denominations of -/5, -/10, -/25 and -/50, and 1/= and 2/=; -/25 coins were not minted after 1969 (except in the 1973 set); 2/= coins were last minted in 1971 (except in the 1973 set). In 1973 and 1985, 5/= coins were introduced, followed by 10/= in 1994 and 20/= in 1998.

Between 1967 and 1978, the portrait of Jomo Kenyatta, the first president of Kenya, originally appeared on the obverse of all of independent Kenya's coins. In 1980, a portrait of Daniel arap Moi replaced Kenyatta until 2005, when the central bank introduced a new coin series that restored the portrait of Kenyatta. The coins are -/50 and 1/= in stainless steel and bi-metallic coins of 5/=, 10/= and 20/=. A bi-metallic 40/= coin with the portrait of then-President Mwai Kibaki was issued in 2003 to commemorate the fortieth anniversary of Kenyan independence (1963).

Coins of Kenya, 1980 and 2003
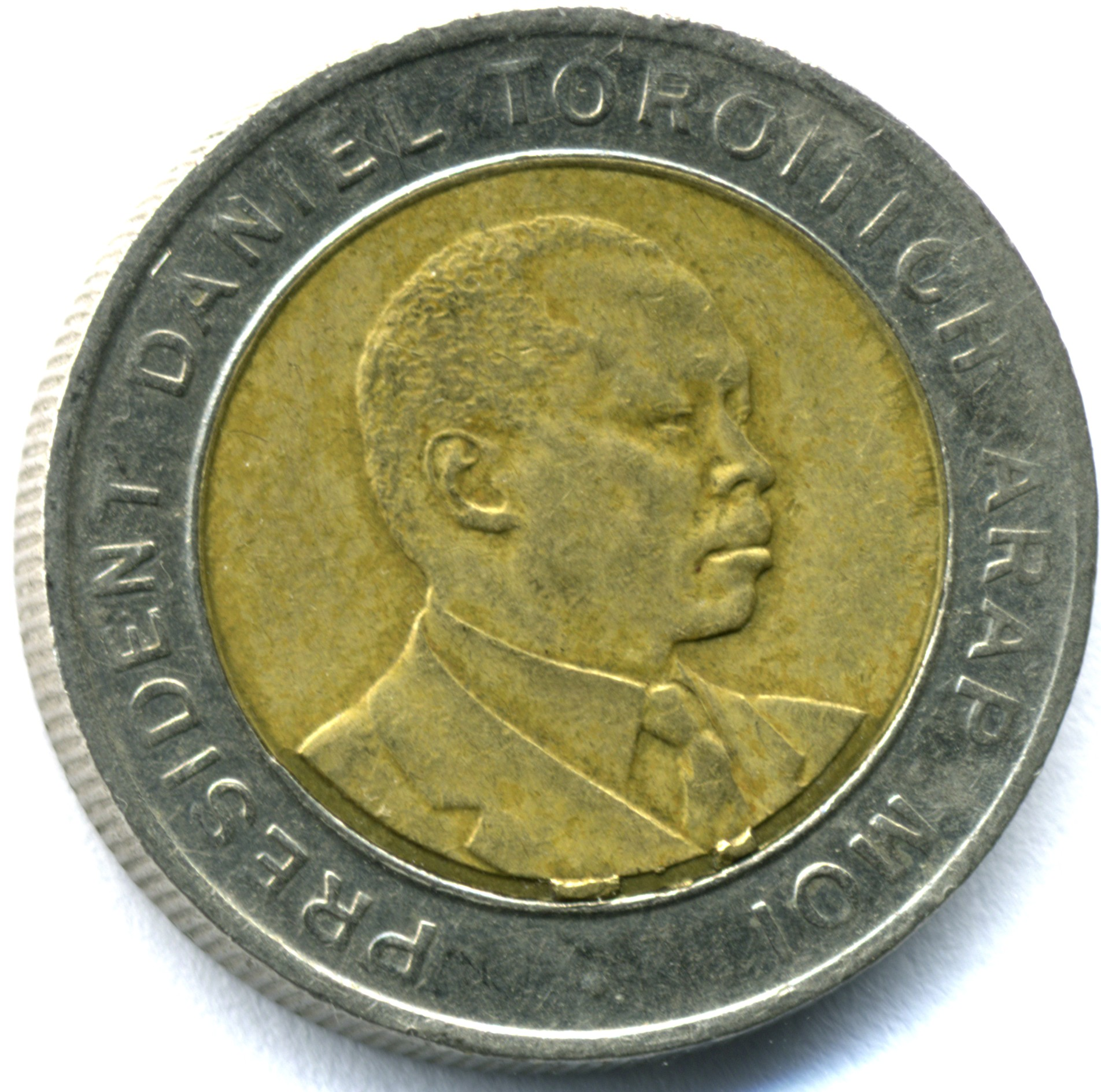
5/= coin – obverse

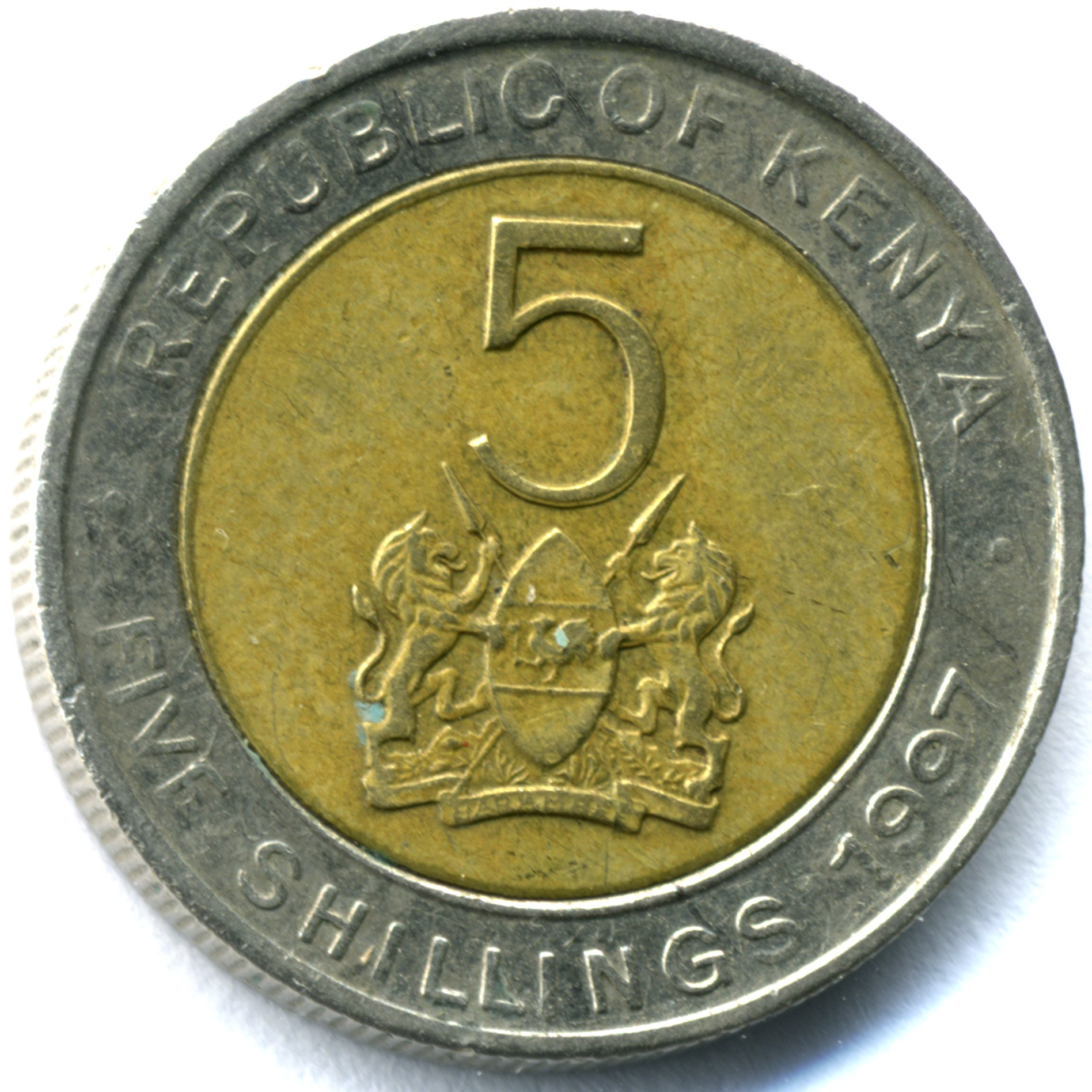
5/= coin – reverse

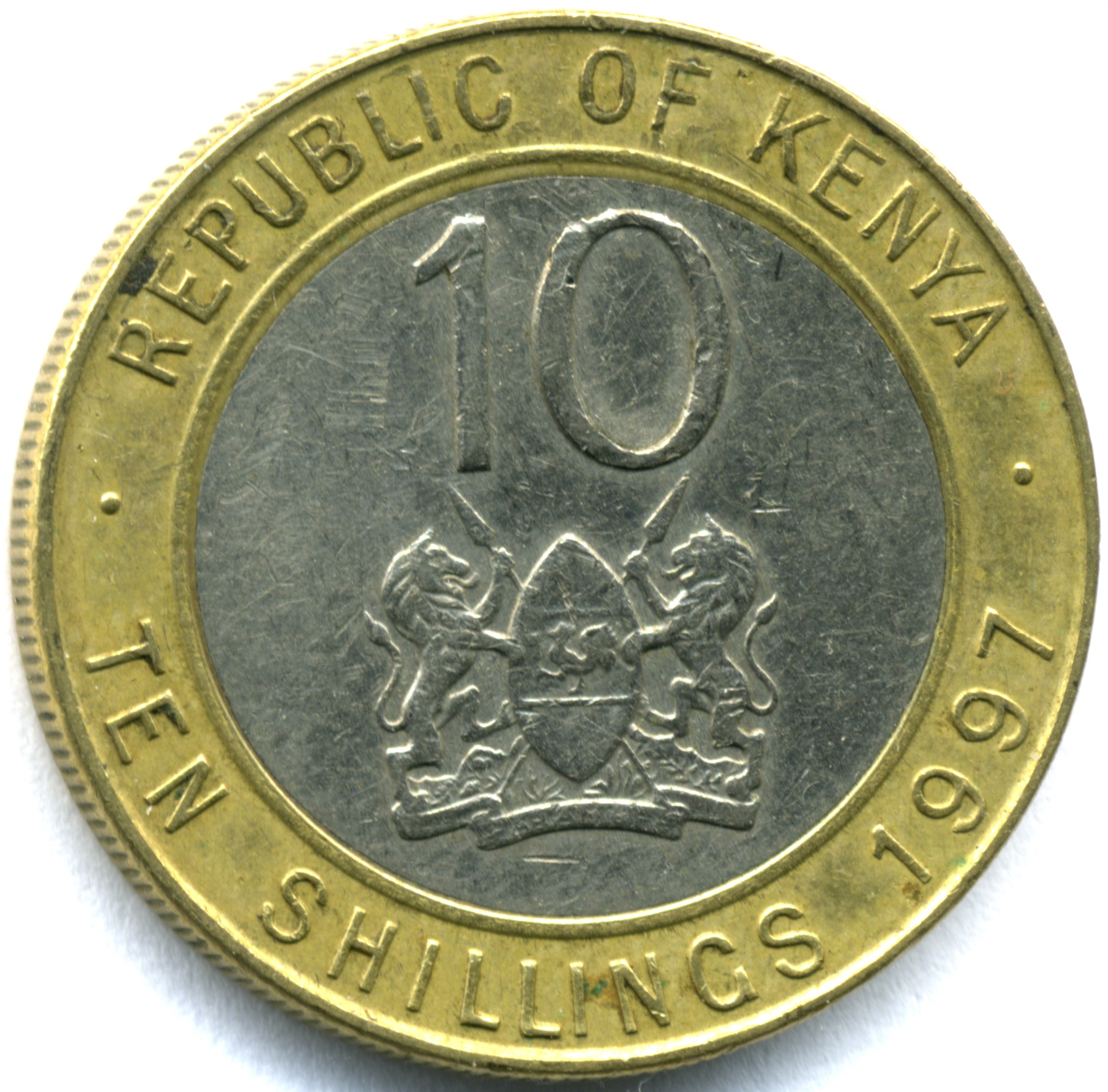
10/= coin

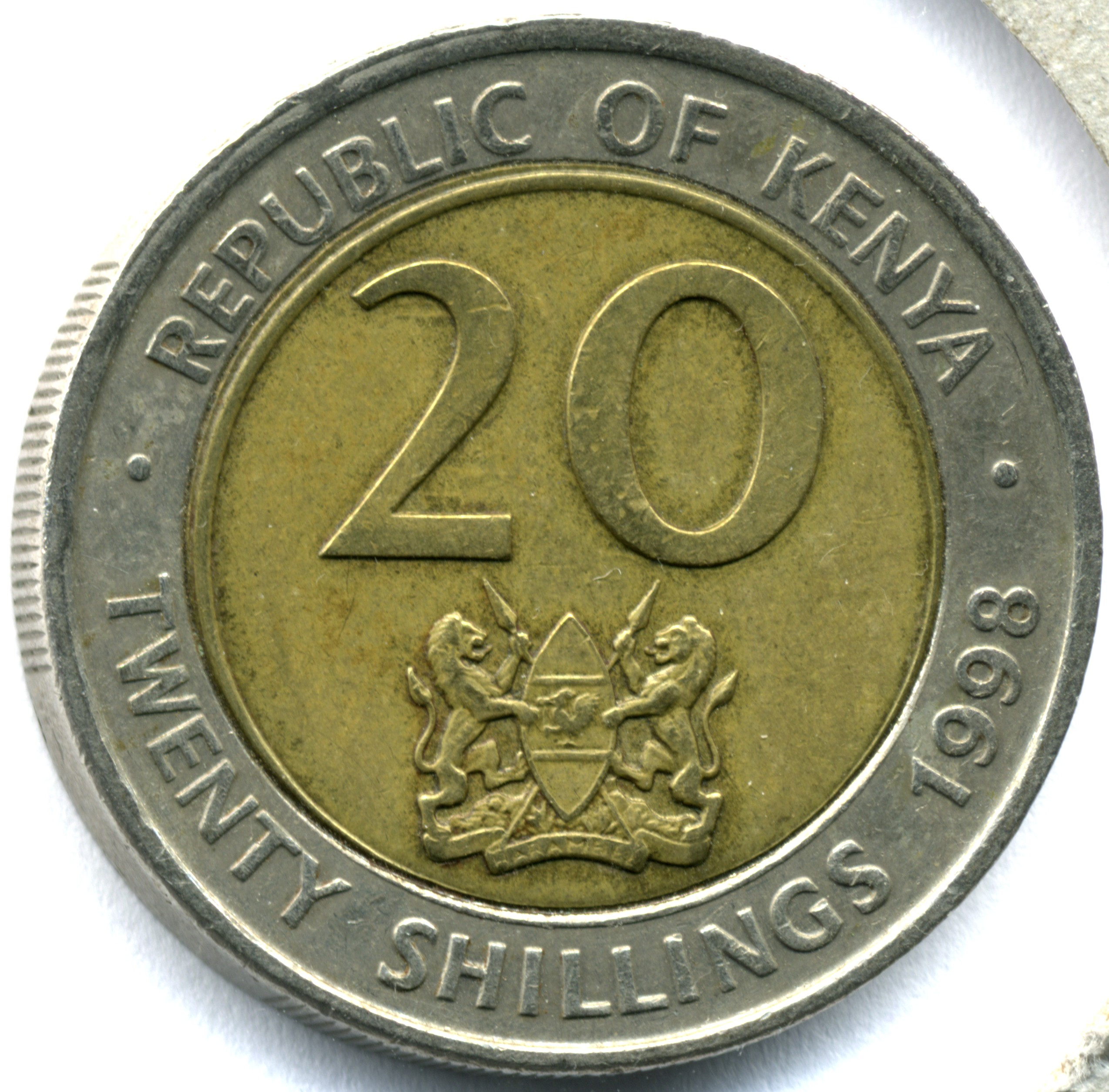
20/= coin

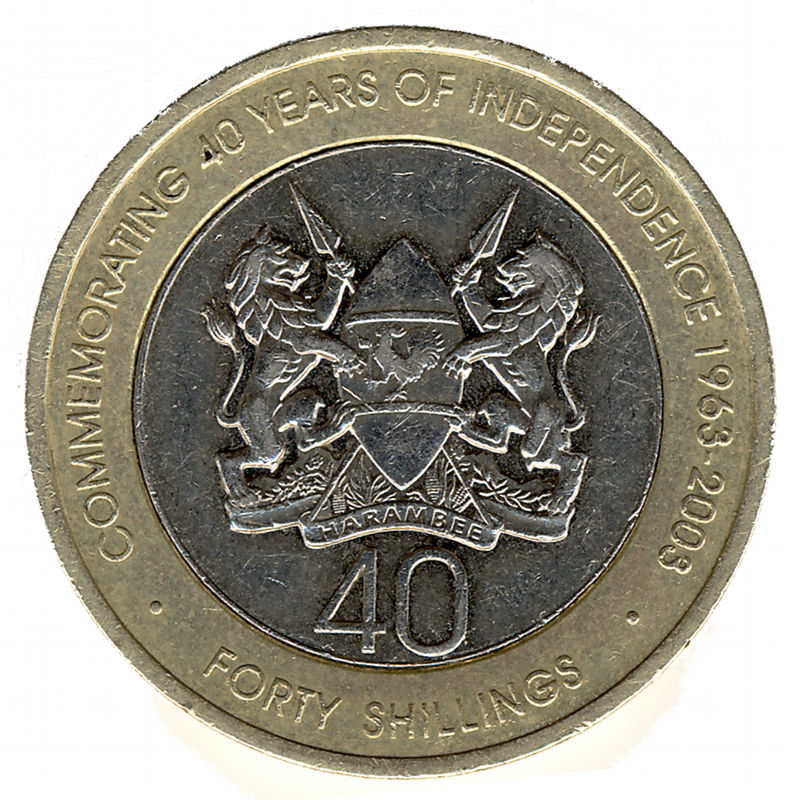
40/= commemorative coin

New coins with the image of Kenyatta were issued in 2005. In 2010, Section 231(4) of the 2010 Constitution of Kenya stated "Notes and coins issued by the Central Bank of Kenya may bear images that depict or symbolise Kenya or an aspect of Kenya but may not bear the portrait of any individual." New banknotes and coins were scheduled to be released by 2018 to meet up with this new law. A new series of coins was issued on 11 December 2018, in denominations of 1/=, 5/=, 10/= and 20/=. All of the coins depict the national Coat of arms of Kenya on the obverse and images of Africa's recognisable animals on the reverse. The new series of coins is designed to be more recognisable for visually impaired people.

Coins of the Kenyan shilling (2018 issues)
Image	Value	Technical parameters				Description	
Image	Value	Diameter	Mass	Composition	Edge	Obverse	Reverse
	1/=	23.9 mm	5.5 grams	Nickel-plated steel	Segmented (Plain and Reeded sections)	Coat of arms of Kenya; text "Republic of Kenya" in English and Swahili	Giraffe; denomination in English and Swahili
	5/=	19.5 mm	3.75 grams	Bi-metallic coin (Brass-plated steel center plug with a Nickel-plated steel outer ring)	Reeded	Coat of arms of Kenya; text "Republic of Kenya" in English and Swahili	Rhinoceros; denomination in English and Swahili
	10/=	23 mm	5 grams	Bi-metallic coin (Nickel-plated steel center plug with a Brass-plated steel outer ring)	Reeded	Coat of arms of Kenya; text "Republic of Kenya" in English and Swahili	Lion; denomination in English and Swahili
	20/=	26 mm	9 grams	Bi-metallic coin (Brass-plated steel center plug with a Nickel-plated steel outer ring)	Segmented (Plain and Reeded sections)	Coat of arms of Kenya; text "Republic of Kenya" in English and Swahili	Elephant; denomination in English and Swahili

=== Phenomenon of traders rejecting lower denomination coins ===
Sellers and consumers alike, especially within the rural areas, have increasingly rejected the 50 cents and 1 shilling coins, despite assurances from the Central Bank of Kenya regarding their continued validity. The reluctance to accept these coins has stemmed from perceptions among both sellers and consumers that they lack substantial value.

=== Banknotes ===
On 14 September 1966, the Kenyan shilling replaced the East African shilling at par, although the latter was not demonetised until 1969. The Central Bank of Kenya issued notes in denominations of 5/=, 10/=, 20/=, 50/= and 100/=. All of the notes feature a portrait of Kenya's first prime minister and president, Jomo Kenyatta, on the front and diverse economic activities on the back.

5/= notes were replaced by coins in 1985, with the same happening to 10/= and 20/= in 1994 and 1998. In 1986, 200/= notes were introduced, followed by 500/= in 1988 and 1,000/= in 1994.

As with the coins, Kenyatta appeared on the banknotes issued until 1978, with Daniel arap Moi's portrait replacing him in 1980. In 2003, after Mwai Kibaki replaced Moi as president, 5/=, 10/=, and 20/= notes from the 1978 series with Kenyatta's picture that had been in storage were issued, and circulated for a time. A new series of notes was then introduced on which Kenyatta reappeared in denominations of 50/=, 100/=, 200/=, 500/= and 1,000/=. The issue of the 200/= banknote dated 12 December 2003 commemorates the "40 years of Independence 1963–2003". The banknotes are printed in Nairobi by security printer De La Rue.

On 31 May 2019, the Central Bank of Kenya issued a new family of banknotes without the portraits of known Kenyan individuals, as mandated by the Constitution of Kenya of 2010. At the same time, the Central Bank of Kenya has withdrawn all previous versions of the 1,000/= banknote. These remained legal tender until 1 October 2019. All of the banknotes for this series share a common design of the Kenyatta International Convention Centre on the front side of the notes, and the back side of the notes feature images showcasing the richness of the people and nature of Kenya: "Green Energy" (50/=), "Agriculture" (100/=), "Social Services" (200/=), "Tourism" (500/=) and "Governance" (1,000/=). All five denominations also embody each of the big five animals of Africa: the buffalo (50/=), the leopard (100/=), rhinoceros (200/=), the lion (500/=) and the elephant (1,000/=).

=== 2024 series banknotes ===
The Central Bank of Kenya introduced an updated series of banknotes beginning with the KES 1,000 denomination in 2024. This newly released banknote retains a similar design to the previous series but features several key updates. These changes include: new signatures from the current Governor of the Central Bank of Kenya, Kamau Thugge and the designated member of the bank's board, year of printing and an upgraded enhanced security thread to counter counterfeiting.

The new KES 1,000 banknote will circulate concurrently with those from earlier series, maintaining the continuity of the currency in Kenya.

During the initial announcement of the updated banknotes, some online controversy arose after the Central Bank of Kenya's governor mentioned that a German company had been awarded the printing contract but did not specify the specific company. It was later revealed that the contract was awarded to Giesecke+Devrient Currency Technologies GmbH, a German firm, with the agreement set to last for five years.

Banknotes of the Kenyan shilling (1996 "Arap Moi" issue)
Image	Denomination	Obverse	Reverse	Watermark
	20/=	President Daniel Toroitich arap Moi; Coat of arms of Kenya	Baton; Moi International sports complex, Nairobi, jogger	Lion's head
	50/=	President Daniel Toroitich arap Moi; Coat of arms of Kenya	Caravan; Elephant tusks monument in Moi Avenue (formerly Kilindini Road), Mombasa	Lion's head
	100/=	President Daniel Toroitich arap Moi; Coat of arms of Kenya	Monument to the 25th anniversary of independence, Nairobi	Lion's head
	200/=	President Daniel Toroitich arap Moi; Coat of arms of Kenya	Unity monument, Nairobi	Lion's head
	500/=	President Daniel Toroitich arap Moi; Coat of arms of Kenya	Parliament building, Nairobi	Lion's head
	1,000/=	President Daniel Toroitich arap Moi; Coat of arms of Kenya	Elephants	Lion's head

Banknotes of the Kenyan shilling (2004 "Jomo Kenyatta" issue (to be withdrawn from circulation))
Image	Denomination	Obverse	Reverse	Watermark
	50/=	President Jomo Kenyatta; Coat of arms of Kenya	Caravan; Elephant tusks monument in Moi Avenue (formerly Kilindini Road), Mombasa	Lion's head and electrotype 50
	100/=	President Jomo Kenyatta; Coat of arms of Kenya	Kenyatta statue; tower	Lion's head and electrotype 100
	200/=	President Jomo Kenyatta; Coat of arms of Kenya	Cotton harvest	Lion's head and electrotype 200
	500/=	President Jomo Kenyatta; Coat of arms of Kenya	Parliament building, Nairobi	Lion's head and electrotype 500
	1,000/=	President Jomo Kenyatta; Coat of arms of Kenya	Elephants	Lion's head and electrotype 1000

Banknotes of the Kenyan shilling (2019 issue (current issue))
Image	Denomination	Main Colour	Obverse	Reverse	Watermark
	50/=	Red	Coat of arms of Kenya; Statue of President Jomo Kenyatta; Kenyatta International Convention Centre; Buffalo	"Green Energy" (Wind Power, geothermal power, solar power)	Lion's head and electrotype 50
	100/=	Violet	Coat of arms of Kenya; Statue of President Jomo Kenyatta; Kenyatta International Convention Centre; Leopard	"Agriculture" (Cereal, agriculture, livestock)	Lion's head and electrotype 100
	200/=	Blue	Coat of arms of Kenya; Statue of President Jomo Kenyatta; Kenyatta International Convention Centre; Rhinoceros	"Social Services" (Health services, Education, sports)	Lion's head and electrotype 200
	500/=	Green	Coat of arms of Kenya; Statue of President Jomo Kenyatta; Kenyatta International Convention Centre; Lion	"Tourism" (Wildlife; Lion)	Lion's head and electrotype 500
	1000/=	Brown	Coat of arms of Kenya; Statue of President Jomo Kenyatta; Kenyatta International Convention Centre; Elephant	"Governance" (Parliament building, Nairobi)	Lion's head and electrotype 1000

== Exchange rate ==
The current exchange rate is readily obtainable from services such as those in the table below:

Current KES exchange rates
From Google Finance:	AUD CAD CHF CNY EUR GBP HKD JPY USD
From Yahoo! Finance:	AUD CAD CHF CNY EUR GBP HKD JPY USD
From XE.com:	AUD CAD CHF CNY EUR GBP HKD JPY USD
From OANDA:	AUD CAD CHF CNY EUR GBP HKD JPY USD

== See also ==
- Economy of Kenya
- Ugandan shilling
- Tanzanian shilling
- Shilingi (disambiguation)

Preceded by: East African shilling Reason: currency independence Ratio: at par Note: independent shilling introduced in 1966, but EA shilling not demonetised until 1969	Currency of Kenya; 1966 –	Succeeded by: Current
