= Gideon Nkojo =

Ugandan economist (1936–2020)

- Born: 23 May 1936; Fort Portal, Uganda
- Died: 19 November 2020 (aged 84); McLean, Virginia, United States
- Occupation: Economist
- Years active: 1966–2009
- Known for: Integrity
- Title: Former Governor of Bank of Uganda (1979 - 1980)

Gedion B. Nkojo Atwoki, commonly known as Gedion Nkojo (23 May 1936 – 19 November 2020), was a Ugandan economist, who served as the governor of the Bank of Uganda, the national central bank and banking regulator, from May 1979 until his resignation in September 1980.

== Background and education ==
Nkojo was born on 23 May 1936. He was the son of the late Hosea (Yosiya) Nkojo, who at one time was the Prime Minister Tooro Kingdom.

== Career ==
Nkojo's career at the World Bank stretches over many decades, before and after his tenure as Governor of Bank of Uganda. Among his many assignments, he worked as the World Bank representative to various counties, including Kenya, Zambia and Zimbabwe.

In May 1979, president Yusuf Lule appointed him as Governor of Uganda's Central Bank. He continued to serve in that role, when Godfrey Binaisa replaced Yusuf Lule as president. One of the ministers in Binaisa's cabinet approached Nkojo and asked for a fraudulent withdrawal of a large sum of money. Nkojo refused. When the minister persisted, Nkojo resigned and returned to the World Bank, in Washington, DC.

Nkojo is credited with the "restructuring of the Central Bank from the economic crisis that hit Uganda during Idi Amin's.." reign. He persuaded the international community to work with the new administration in Kampala, to rehabilitate the country after Amin was deposed.

Gideon Nkojo has been described in Ugandan media, as "one of the most incorruptible Ugandan technocrats".

== Other considerations ==
From 2003 until 2009, Nkojo was the Patron of Tooro Youth Platform for Action (Engabu Za Tooro), a community self-help development platform.

== See also ==
- Bank of Uganda
- Governor of the Bank of Uganda
