= Shilingi =

Shilingi is the Swahili word for "shilling". Specifically it may refer to:

- East African shilling (Swahili: Shilingi ya Afrika Mashariki), the former currency of the British colonies and protectorates in East Africa
- Kenyan shilling (Swahili: Shilingi ya Kenya), the currency of Kenya
- Tanzanian shilling (Swahili: Shilingi ya Tanzania), the currency of Tanzania
- Ugandan shilling (Swahili: Shilingi ya Uganda), the currency of Uganda
