= Crane Bank =

Commercial bank in Uganda

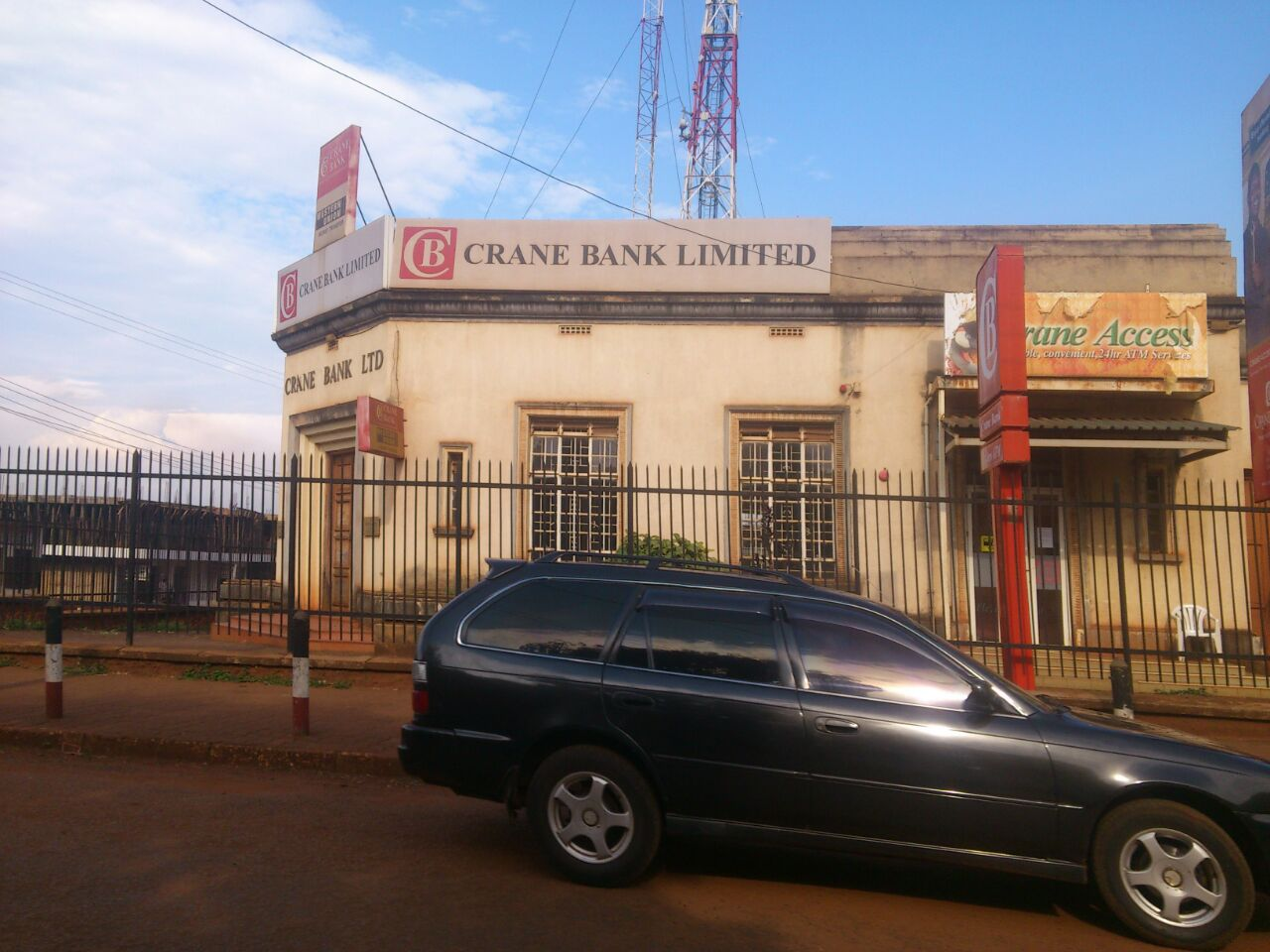
- Jinja branch
- Company type: Private
- Industry: Financial services
- Founded: 1995
- Headquarters: 38 Kampala Road, Kampala, Uganda
- Key people: Joseph Biribonwa chairman P. K. Gupta acting chief executive officer
- Products: Loans, savings, checking, investments, debit cards, credit cards, mortgages
- Revenue: ▼After tax: UGX:12.52 billion (2015)
- Total assets: UGX:1.81 trillion (2015)
- Number of employees: 600+ (2015)
- Website: Homepage

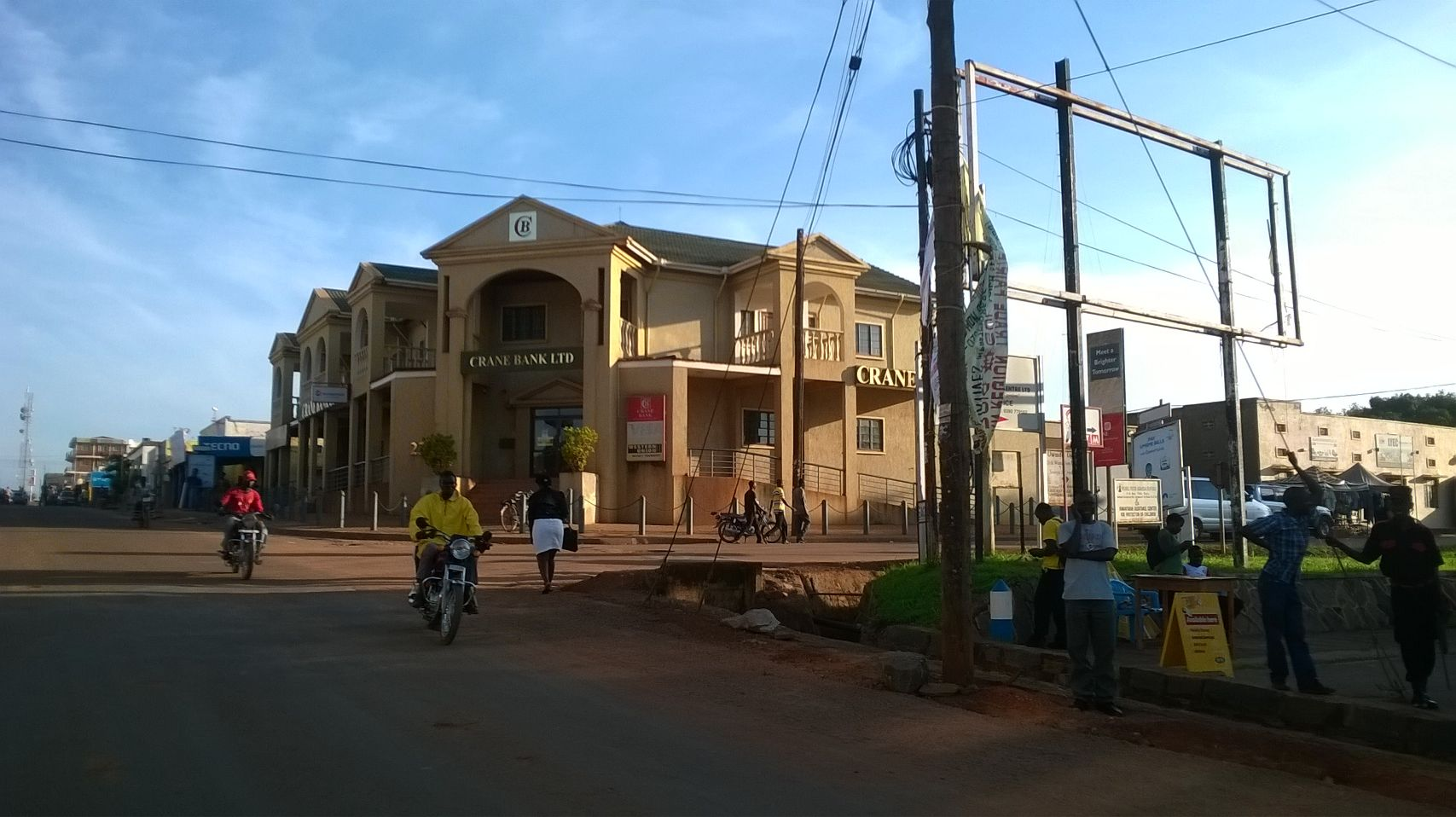
Crane bank Gulu branch

Crane Bank Limited was a commercial bank in Uganda licensed and supervised by the Bank of Uganda (BOU), the central bank and national banking regulator. Crane Bank was acquired by DFCU Bank in January 2017 at a cost of Ush200 billion ($52.8 million) on grounds that it was undercapitalized as declared by the regulator Bank of Uganda.

Crane Bank Limited was closed by Bank of Uganda (BoU) on 20 October 2016, after it failed to comply with a capital call on 1 July 2016. On 11 February 2022 the Supreme Court dismissed Bank of Uganda’s appeal against Sudhir Ruparelia and Meera Investments, and ordered the central bank to directly pay costs at all Court levels.

== Overview ==
The bank was a large financial services provider in Uganda. As of 31 December 2015, Crane Bank's assets were UGX:1.81 trillion, with shareholders' equity of UGX:281.43 billion. In October 2015, it had more than 750,000 customers.

== History ==
Crane Bank started operations on 21 August 1995 "with a vision of being the largest privately owned Ugandan Bank."

In September 2012, Crane Bank acquired the assets and some of the liabilities of the National Bank of Commerce, a small, indigenous, financial services provider in Uganda that had lost its banking license.

On 30 January 2014, Crane Bank established Crane Bank Rwanda Limited, a wholly owned subsidiary, with the first branch in Rwanda opening to customers on 30 June 2014.

== Ownership ==
On 27 January 2017, DFCU took over the bank, which had been under the statutory management of the BOU because the bank's liabilities exceeded its assets. The acquisition included all customer deposit accounts and loan accounts.

The bank was previously a member of the Ruparelia Group.

In September 2013, Ugandan print media reported that the bank's stock would be listed on the Uganda Securities Exchange in 2014. Those plans, however, were put on hold, with the bank explaining at the end of 2014 that it was focusing on its expansion plans first.

In September 2016, Ugandan print media indicated that the bank was actively searching for a strategic partner to acquire shares in the bank. In October 2016, the potential strategic partner was identified as Bob Diamond of the Atlas Mara Limited. Negotiations were still ongoing as of 11 October 2016. On 20 October 2016, the BOU took over the management of Crane Bank and started a sale process. The thirteen bidders included DFCU, Barclays Bank of Uganda, First National Bank of South Africa, Ricardo Santos Silva of Aethel Partners Limited of the United Kingdom, and General Equity, a New Zealand-based fund.

On 20 October 2016, the BOU took over the management of Crane Bank, suspending its board and acting CEO. This seizure was related to the bank's under-capitalization. Edward Katimbo Mugwanya was appointed statutory manager and reported directly to the governor of BOU.

In January 2017, DFCU acquired Crane Bank. DFCU Bank had offered to recapitalise Crane Bank with US$21.6 million after take-over and Aethel Partners Limited offered UGX:1 for the bank's assets and liabilities and also committed to invest US$215 million in Crane Bank to clean the balance sheet. Whereas DFCU Bank offered to clear all of Crane Bank's verified debts, Aethel Partners insisted it would clear only part of the failed lender's debts because of the severe corporate governance and financial risks tied to the bank. These factors boosted DFCU's bid.

== Controversy ==
The "Report on the preliminary forensic review at Crane Bank" (December 2016), which was authored by PricewaterhouseCoopers and commissioned by the Bank of Uganda, recommended the prosecution of Crane Bank's board of directors, investors, and senior management for allegedly flaunting Uganda's banking laws and allegedly committing various financial crimes.

== See also ==
- List of banks in Uganda
- Banking in Uganda
- Economy of Uganda
