= Onegi Obel =

Ugandan politician (1932–2008)

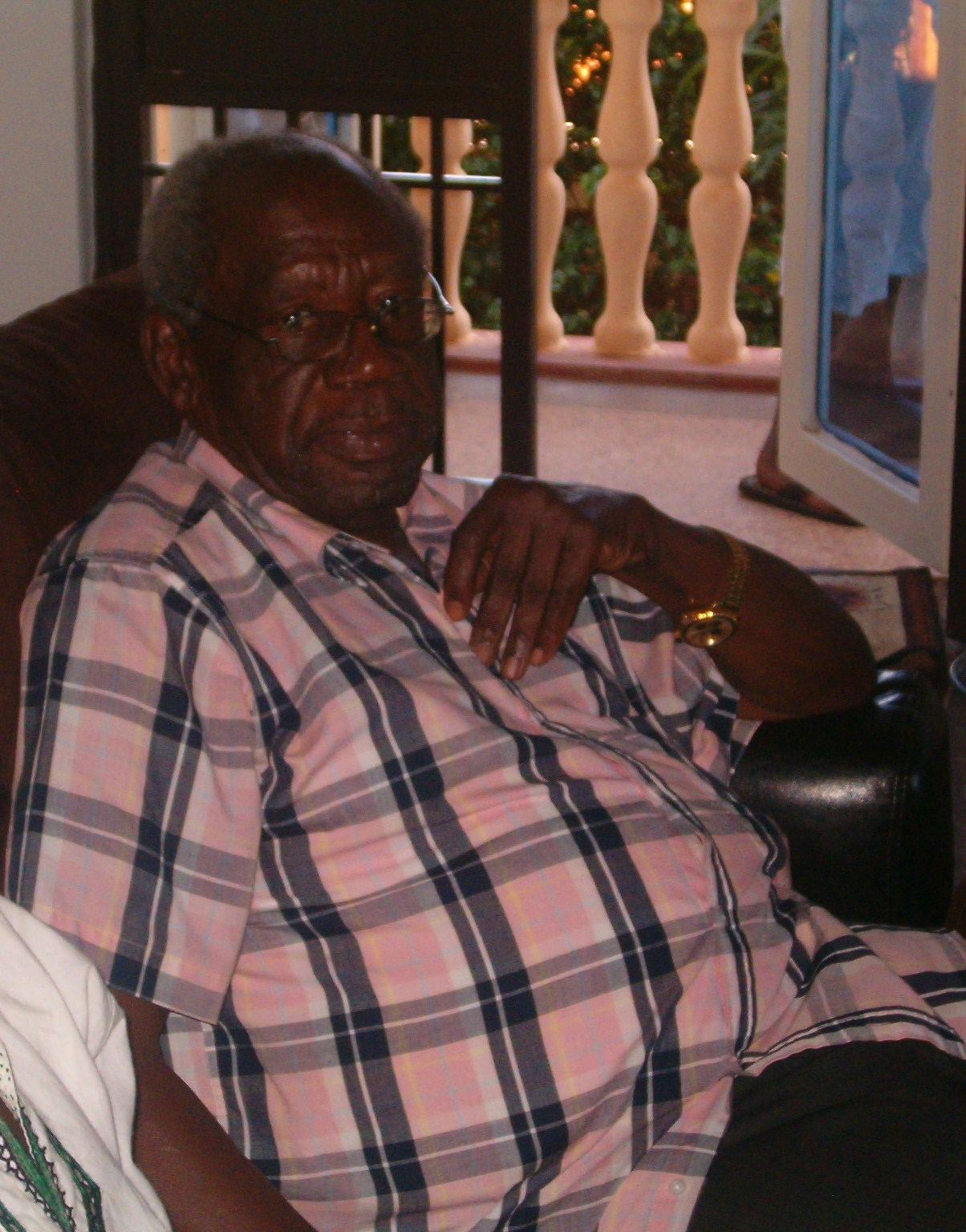
- Onegi Obel
- Born: Onegi Obel; 4 April 1932; Pacego Pumvuga; Nebbi District, Uganda
- Died: 16 December 2008 (aged 76)
- Education: St. Aloysius College (Junior School Certificate); Namilyango College (Ordinary Cambridge School Certificate); Overseas Correspondence School Advanced Cambridge School Certificate; Assumption University (Bachelor of Arts in Economics); University of Toronto (Master of Arts in Economics)
- Occupations: Economist, politician
- Years active: 1954–2008
- Title: Governor of the Bank of Uganda (1973–1978)
- Spouse: Agnes Atoh

Angelo Onegi Obel (4 April 1932 – 16 December 2008) was a Ugandan economist and politician and adviser to the President of Uganda. He also served as the Governor of the Bank of Uganda from 1973 to 1978.

== Background and education ==
Obel was born on 4 April 1932, in the village of Pacego Pumvuga, Panyango sub-county, Jonam County in today's Nebbi District, West Nile sub-region. At that time, the West Nile sub-region was known as West Nile District. In the early 1940s he attended Ngetta Catholic Primary School' in Lira, before attending junior secondary school at St. Aloysius College in Nyapea, Nebbi District, graduating from there in 1948. In 1949, he was admitted to Namilyango College, a prestigious all-boys boarding secondary school, graduating from there in 1953, with the Ordinary Cambridge School Certificate (O-Level). Later he enrolled in an overseas correspondence school and obtained the Advanced Cambridge School Certificate (A-Level). Still later, he enrolled in Assumption University, in Canada, graduating with the degree of Bachelor of Arts in Economics. He transferred to the University of Toronto, where he obtained the degree of Master of Arts in Economics. He returned to Uganda in 1965.

== Career ==
After graduating from Namilyango College, Obel became employed by the Uganda Government, as a clerical officer in accountancy in Lira and Arua. When he returned from further studies in Canada, he took up employment in the Ministry of Finance, serving as Commissioner for Taxation. In 1968, he was transferred to Bank of Uganda as the deputy governor, from 1968 until 1973. In 1973, he was appointed Governor of the Bank of Uganda, serving in that capacity in 1978.

He was elected to the Constituent Assembly that drafted the 1995 constitution of Uganda. His efforts towards developing the economy and instructure of Uganda and corporate interests often led to conflict and in 2006, for instance, he was involved in a legal battle over the construction of a bridge which jeopardized the livelihoods of local farmers.

== Other considerations ==
Onegi Obel died on 16 December 2008 from natural cases. He was survived by his wife, Agnes Atoh, many children and many grandchildren. One of his sons is Geoffrey Onegi Obel, who once served as the Chairman of National Social Security Fund.
