= Ugandan shilling =

Currency of Uganda

shilingi ya Uganda (Swahili)
- Obverse of the 1,000/= note

ISO 4217
- Code: UGX (numeric: 800)

Unit
- Unit: shilling
- Plural: shillings

Denominations
- Banknotes: 1,000/=, 2,000/=, 5,000/=, 10,000/=, 20,000/=, 50,000/=
- Coins
- Freq. used: 100/=, 200/=, 500/=, 1,000/=
- Rarely used: 50/=

Demographics
- User(s): Uganda

Issuance
- Central bank: Bank of Uganda
- Website: www.bou.or.ug

Valuation
- Inflation: 4.7%
- Source: The World Factbook, 2014 est.

The shilling (Swahili: shilingi; abbreviation: USh; ISO code: UGX) is the currency of Uganda. Officially divided into cents until 2013, due to substantial inflation the shilling now has no subdivision.

== Notation ==
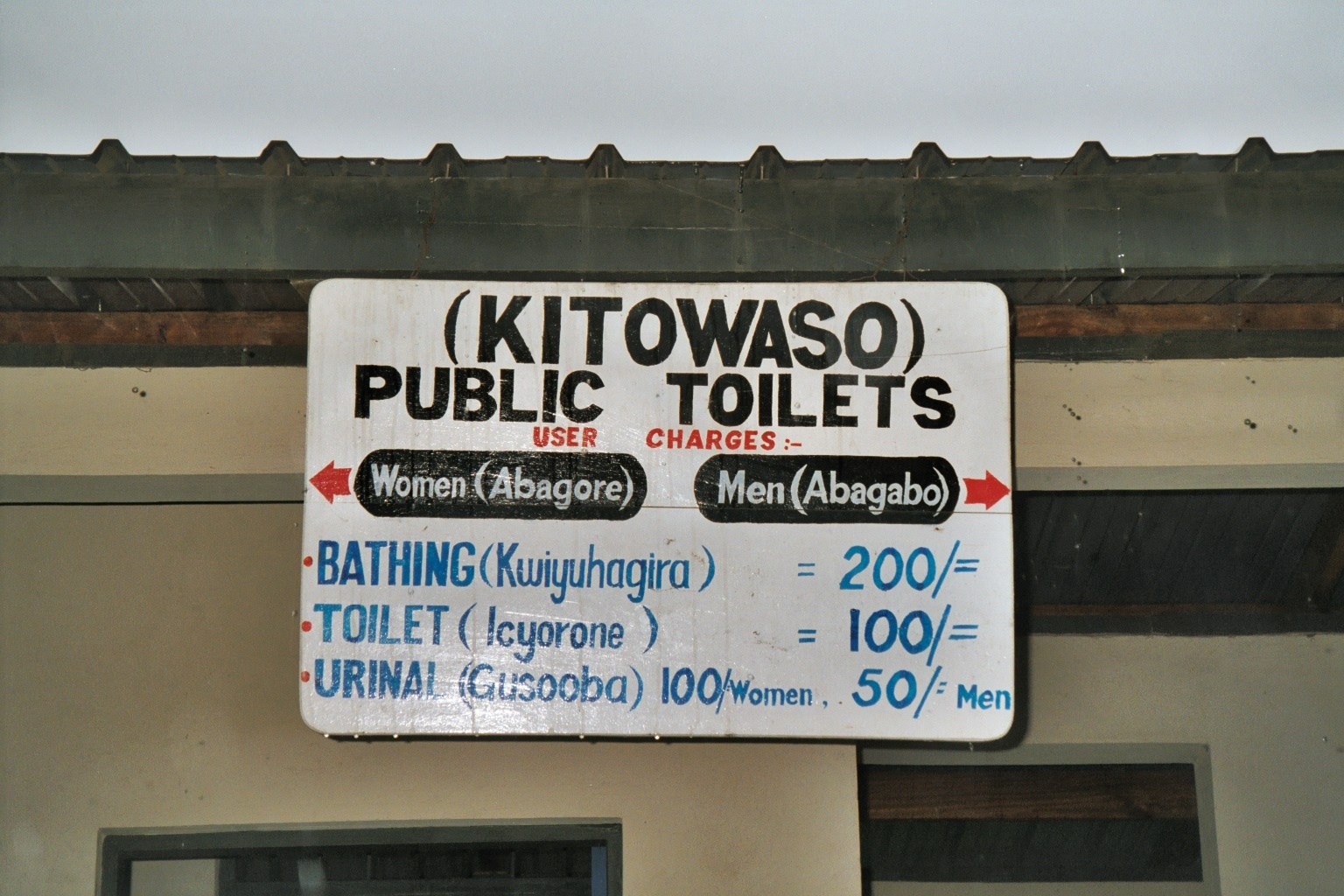
Sign in Kisoro with prices in Ugandan shillings; note the use of the '/=' symbol.

Prices in the Ugandan shilling are written in the form of x/y, where x is the amount in shillings, while y is the amount in cents. An equals sign or hyphen represents zero amount. For example, 50 cents is written as "-/50" and 100 shillings as "100/=" or "100/-". Sometimes the abbreviation USh is prefixed for distinction. If the amount is written using words as well as numerals, only the prefix is used (e.g. USh 10 million).

This pattern was modelled on sterling's pre-decimal notation, in which amounts were written in some combination of pounds (£), shillings (s), and pence (d, for denarius). In that notation, amounts under a pound were notated only in shillings and pence.

== History ==
The first Ugandan shilling (UGS) replaced the East African shilling in 1966 at par. Following high inflation, a new shilling (UGX) was introduced in 1987 worth 100 old shillings.

The shilling is usually a stable currency and predominates in most financial transactions in Uganda, which has a very efficient foreign exchange market with low spreads. The United States dollar is also widely accepted. Sterling and increasingly the euro are also used.

The Bank of Uganda cut its policy rate to 22% on 1 February 2012 after reduction of inflation for 3 consecutive months.

== Coins ==
=== First shilling ===
In 1966, coins were introduced in denominations of -/5, -/10, -/20 and -/50 and 1/= and 2/=. The -/5, -/10 and -/20 coins were struck in bronze, with the higher denominations struck in cupro-nickel. The 2-shilling was only issued that year. In 1972, cupro-nickel 5-shilling coins were issued but were withdrawn from circulation and are now very rare. In 1976, copper-plated steel replaced bronze in the 5- and 10-cent and cupro-nickel-plated steel replaced cupro-nickel in the 50-cent and 1-shilling. In 1986, nickel-plated-steel 50-cent and 1-shilling coins were issued, the last coins of the first shilling.

First Ugandan shilling coins
Image	Value	Composition	Diameter	Weight	Thickness	Edge	Issued
	-/5	bronze	20 mm	3.21 g	1.38 mm	Smooth	1966–1975
	-/5	bronze-plated steel	20 mm	3.21 g	1.2 mm	Smooth	1976
	-/10	bronze	25 mm	5 g	1.5 mm	Smooth	1966–1975
	-/10	bronze-plated steel	25 mm	4.5 g	1.5 mm	Smooth	1976
	-/20	bronze	28 mm	9.76 g	2.07 mm	Smooth	1966–1974
	-/50	copper-nickel	22 mm	4.60 g	1.5 mm	Reeded	1966–1974
	-/50	copper-nickel-plated steel	22 mm	4 g	1.5 mm	Reeded	1976
	1/=	copper-nickel	25.5 mm	6.50 g	1.5 mm	Reeded	1966–1975
	1/=	copper-nickel-plated steel	25.5 mm	6.50 g	1.5 mm	Reeded	1976
	2/=	copper-nickel	30 mm	11.7 g	1.5 mm	Reeded	1976
	5/=	copper-nickel	30 mm (heptagonal)	13.5 g	2 mm	Smooth	1976

=== Second shilling ===
In 1987, copper-plated-steel 1/= and 2/= and stainless-steel 5/= and 10/= coins were introduced, with the 5/= and 10/= curved-equilateral heptagonal in shape. In 1998, coins for 50/=, 100/=, 200/= and 500/= were introduced. Denominations currently circulating are 50/=, 100/=, 200/=, 500/=, and 1,000/=.

Second Ugandan shilling coins
Image	Value	Composition	Reverse design	Diameter	Weight	Thickness	Edge	Issued
	50/=	Nickel-plated Steel	Ankole-Watusi	21 mm	3.9 g	1.8 mm	Smooth	1998–2015
	100/=	Copper-nickel	Ankole-Watusi	27 mm	7 g	1.73 mm	Reeded	1998–2008
	100/=	Nickel-plated Steel	Ankole-Watusi	27 mm	6.6 g	1.73 mm	Reeded	2007–2022
	200/=	Copper-nickel	Nile perch	25 mm	8.5 g	2.05 mm	Smooth	1998–2003
	200/=	Nickel-plated Steel	Nile perch	25 mm	7.25 g	2.05 mm	Smooth	2007–2022
	500/=	Aluminum-brass	East African crowned crane	23.5 mm	9 g	2.9 mm	Reeded	1998–2022
	1,000/=	Bi-Metallic nickel-brass plated nickel center in nickel-brass ring	East African crowned crane	27 mm	10.25 g	3 mm	Reeded	2012

== Banknotes ==
=== First shilling ===
In 1966, the Bank of Uganda introduced notes in denominations of 5/=, 10/=, 20/= and 100/=. In 1973, 50/= notes were introduced, followed by 500/= and 1,000/= in 1983 and 5,000/= in 1985.

=== Second shilling ===
In 1987, notes were introduced in the new currency in denominations of 5/=, 10/=, 20/=, 50/=, 100/= and 200/=. In 1991, 500/= and 1,000/= notes were added, followed by 5,000/= in 1993, 10,000/= in 1995, 20,000/= in 1999, 50,000/= in 2003 and 2,000/= in 2010. Banknotes currently in circulation are 1,000/=, 2,000/=, 5,000/=, 10,000/=, 20,000/= and 50,000/=. In 2005, the Bank of Uganda was considering whether to replace the low-value notes such as the 1,000/= with coins. The lower denomination notes take a battering in daily use, often being very dirty and sometimes disintegrating.

On 17 May 2010, the Bank of Uganda issued a new family of notes featuring a harmonised banknote design that depict Uganda's rich historical, natural, and cultural heritage. They also bear improved security features. Five images appear on all the six denominations: Ugandan mat patterns, Ugandan basketry, the map of Uganda (complete with the equator line), the Independence Monument, and a profile of a man wearing Karimojong headdress. Bank of Uganda Governor Emmanuel Tumusiime Mutebile said the new notes did not constitute a currency reform, nor were they dictated by politics. The redesign, he said, was driven by the need to comply with international practices and to beat counterfeiters. Uganda is the first African country to introduce the advanced security feature SPARK on a regular banknote series. SPARK is an optical security feature recognised by central banks worldwide and is used on a number of banknotes for protection against counterfeiting.

=== Current notes ===
As of April 2023, these are the Ugandan shilling banknotes in circulation:

- 50,000/= yellow
- 20,000/= red
- 10,000/= purple
- 5,000/= green
- 2,000/= blue
- 1,000/= brown

== Exchange rates ==
Current UGX exchange rates
From Google Finance:	AUD CAD CHF CNY EUR GBP HKD JPY USD KYS ZAR
From Yahoo! Finance:	AUD CAD CHF CNY EUR GBP HKD JPY USD KYS ZAR
From XE.com:	AUD CAD CHF CNY EUR GBP HKD JPY USD KYS ZAR
From OANDA:	AUD CAD CHF CNY EUR GBP HKD JPY USD KYS ZAR

== See also ==
- Previously used currencies in Uganda:
  - East African florin – Currency of British East Africa, 1920 - 1921
  - East African rupee – Currency of British East Africa, 1906 - 1920
  - East African shilling – Currency of British East Africa from 1921 until 1969
- Economy of Uganda
- Kenyan shilling – Currency of Kenya
- Shilingi (disambiguation)
- Tanzanian shilling – Currency of Tanzania

First Ugandan shilling
Preceded by: East African shilling Reason: currency independence Ratio: at par Note: independent shilling introduced in 1966, but EA shilling not demonetised until 1969	Currency of Uganda; 1966 – 1987	Succeeded by: Second Ugandan shilling Reason: inflation Ratio: 1 new shilling = 100 old shillings

Second Ugandan shilling
Preceded by: First Ugandan shilling Reason: inflation Ratio: 1 new shilling = 100 old shillings	Currency of Uganda; 1987 –	Succeeded by: Current
