= Louis Kasekende =

Ugandan economist

- Born: 29 August 1958 (age 68); Nsambya Hospital, Uganda
- Citizenship: Uganda
- Education: Makerere University (Bachelor of Arts in Economics); University of Manchester (Master of Arts in Economics) (Doctor of Philosophy in Economics)
- Occupation: Economist
- Years active: 1988 — present
- Known for: Economics
- Title: Executive director of Macroeconomics and Financial Management, Institute of Eastern & Southern Africa (MEFMI).
- Spouse: (Edith Kasekende)

Louis A. Kasekende is a Ugandan economist, who has served as the executive director of the Macroeconomics and Financial Management, Institute of Eastern & Southern Africa (MEFMI), based in Harare, Zimbabwe, since 1 April 2021.

Before that, he served as the Deputy Governor of the Bank of Uganda, the country's central bank. He began his five-year term in this position on 18 January 2010. This marked the second time that he was appointed to this office, having served in the same capacity from 1999 until 2002.

== Education ==
Kasekende holds the degree of Bachelor of Arts (BA) in Economics from Makerere University, Uganda's oldest university. His Master of Arts (MA) degree and his Doctor of Philosophy (PhD) degree, both in Economics, were obtained from the University of Manchester in the United Kingdom.

== Work History ==
From 1988 until 1994, Kasekende worked as a part-time lecturer at Makerere University. He joined the Bank of Uganda in 1986 and served in various capacities including Director of Research, Executive Director of Research and Policy and Deputy Governor. Between 2002 and 2004, Kasekende was seconded to the World Bank by the Uganda government to serve as the Executive Director to the World Bank, representing twenty-two African countries, including Uganda, on the Bank’s executive board.

From May 2006 to 2009, he served at the offices of the African Development Bank (AfDB), in Tunis, Tunisia, as AfDB's Chief Economist. During his tenure, he is credited for playing a leading role in the AfDB’s efforts to help African economies withstand the impact of the global economic crisis. In January 2010, Kasekende was re-appointed Deputy Governor of the Bank of Uganda, to serve for the next five years.

In January 2020, at the expiry of his second consecutive term as Deputy Governor of Bank of Uganda, and without any indication that he would be re-appointed, Louis Kasekende handed over office to his boss at the time, the late Emmanuel Tumusiime Mutebile, and left the central bank.

== Personal details ==
Kasekende is married to Edith Kasekende, and together are the parents of three children. He has written extensively on a wide range of economic subjects and his work has been widely published in journals and books.

== See also ==
- Bank of Uganda
- African Development Bank
- World Bank
- Emmanuel Tumusiime-Mutebile
- List of banks in Uganda
