= Emmanuel Tumusiime-Mutebile =

Ugandan economist (1949–2022)

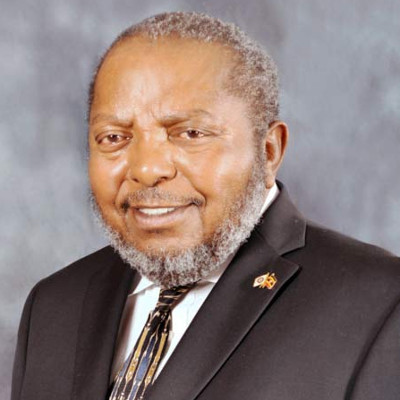
- Born: 27 January 1949; Kabale District, Uganda
- Died: 23 January 2022 (aged 72); Nairobi, Kenya
- Education: St Cuthbert's Society, Durham (BEc); Balliol College, University of Oxford (MEc); University of Dar es Salaam (PhD in Economics)
- Occupations: Economist and Central Banker
- Years active: 1979–2022
- Known for: Economics, fiscal discipline
- Title: Governor, Bank of Uganda
- Honours: Honorary PhD, Nkumba University

Emmanuel Tumusiime-Mutebile (27 January 1949 – 23 January 2022) was a Ugandan economist and banker. He served as the governor of the Bank of Uganda, the central bank of Uganda from 2001 until his death on 23 January 2022.

== Life and career ==
Emmanuel Tumusiime Mutebile was born on 27, January 1949 in Kabale District, Western Uganda to John Wilson Mutebile. He was one of nine children.

Tumusiime-Mutebile attended Kigezi College Butobere for his O-Level studies (grades S1-S4). He then attended Makerere College School in Kampala, Uganda, for his A-Level studies (grades S5-S6). In 1970, he entered Makerere University, where he was elected president of the university Students' Guild.

He was forced to flee Uganda in 1972 after he gave a speech publicly criticizing the expulsion of Asians from the country by Idi Amin. He fled to England via Tanzania, and was able to finish his studies at Durham University, graduating with an upper-second in Economics and Politics. In October 1974, he began his post-graduate studies at Balliol College, Oxford, before returning to East Africa. He entered the University of Dar es Salaam to lecture and conduct research while pursuing his doctorate in economics.

Between the year 1979 and 1984, Tumusiime-Mutebile was appointed to several government positions in Uganda ranging from deputy principal secretary to the president at State House in 1979, to undersecretary in the ministry of planning in 1981 where he rose to senior economist and then chief economist in 1984. In 1992, he was appointed permanent secretary to the newly combined ministry of finance planning & economic development, a merger that he had advocated while working under Minister of Finance Gerald Ssendaula.

He was the governor of the Bank of Uganda from 2001 until his death in 2022. He is the longest-serving chief executive in the Bank of Uganda's history as well as the Africa's longest-serving central bank governor at the time of his death. He is credited with many of the sound economic policies adopted by the Uganda government at the urging of the central bank during the 1990s and the first decade of the 2000s.

Since 2006, he was a visiting professor in the Department of Economics at Makerere University, the oldest and largest university in Uganda. Tumusiime-Mutebile was the chancellor of the International University of East Africa, a private university established in 2011, with an urban campus in Kampala, Uganda's capital. In 2009, Nkumba University, a private university based in Nkumba, near Entebbe, awarded him an honorary Doctor of Philosophy degree in recognition of his "great contribution towards the development of Uganda's financial sector".

Tumusiime died in Nairobi on 23 January 2022, at the age of 72. He suffered from diabetes related complications prior to his death.

== See also ==
- Louis Kasekende
- Ugandan banks
- Economy of Uganda
- Ugandan shilling
- Uganda university leaders
