= Bank of Uganda =

Central bank of Uganda

Bank of Uganda Benki Kuu ya Uganda

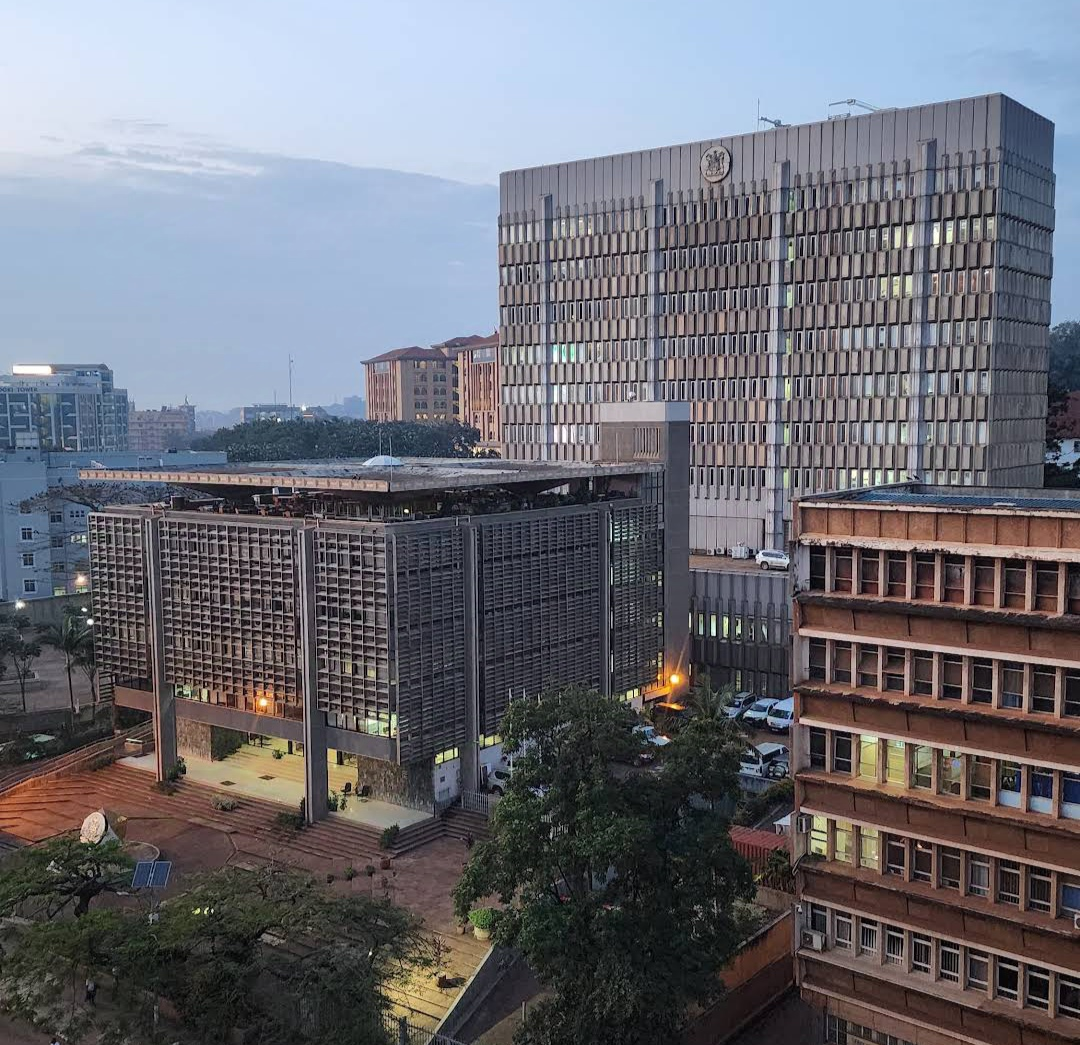
- Central bank of: Uganda
- Headquarters: Kampala, Uganda
- Established: August 16, 1966; 60 years ago
- Ownership: 100 percent state ownership
- Governor: Michael Atingi-Ego
- Currency: Ugandan shilling (USh); UGX (ISO 4217)
- Reserves: US$3.919.8 billion (USh 13,838 trillion) (June 2020)
- Preceded by: East African Currency Board
- Website: Official site

The Bank of Uganda (Swahili: Benki Kuu ya Uganda) is the central bank of Uganda. Established in 1966, by Act of Parliament, the bank is wholly owned by the government but is not a government department.

== History ==
In 1979 and again in 1987, the Bank of Uganda managed to maintain an exchange rate of USh 7/= to US$1. Starting in 1987, the IMF backed the development of the Bank of Uganda, and completed its first stage of recapitalizing the central bank in 1997.

At the AFI Global Policy Forum held in Riviera Maya in Mexico in 2011, the Bank of Uganda was one of the original 17 regulatory institutions to make specific national commitments to financial inclusion under The Maya Declaration.

In June 2019, seven directors of the bank were fired after accusations of printing their own money bills.

== Organization ==
The board of directors of the Bank of Uganda is the bank's supreme policy making body. It is chaired by the governor or, in their absence, by the deputy governor.

The duties and powers of the board are specified by the Bank of Uganda Act. This Act makes the board responsible for the general management of the affairs of the bank. The board formulates policy and ensures that anything required to be done by the bank under the statute as well as anything else that is within or incidental to the functioning of the bank is carried out.

The president of Uganda appoints both the governor and the deputy governor, on the advice of the cabinet, for five-year renewable terms. Other members of the board (not fewer than four and not more than six) are appointed by the minister of finance for three-year renewable terms. The secretary to the treasury is an ex-officio member of the board.

As of June 2019, the bank employed 1,066 people. The Bank of Uganda is a member of the Alliance for Financial Inclusion.

The governor of the Bank of Uganda between 2001 and 2022 was Emmanuel Tumusiime-Mutebile (1949–2022).

== Currency centres ==
The central bank maintains branches and currency centres in various locations around the country, whose purpose is to store, process and monitor the supply of currency to the government and private financial institutions in the surrounding cities, towns, and villages.

1. Arua Branch - Arua
2. Fort Portal Branch - Fort Portal
3. Gulu Branch - Gulu
4. Jinja Branch - Jinja
5. Kabale Branch - Kabale
6. Kampala Branch - Kampala
7. Masaka Branch - Masaka
8. Mbale Branch - Mbale
9. Mbarara Branch - Mbarara
10. Lira Currency Training Center - Lira

== See also ==
- List of banks in Uganda
- Banking in Uganda
- List of central banks of Africa
- List of central banks
- List of financial supervisory authorities by country
