= Barra, Kanpur =

Barra
- Suburb
- Nickname: Southern Suburb of Kanpur
- Country: India
- State: Uttar Pradesh
- District: Kanpur
- Named for: Bara Devi (Temple, near Juhi Lal Colony)

Government
  - Body: Kanpur Municipal Corporation, Kanpur Development Authority

Languages
  - Official: Hindi
- Time zone: UTC+5:30 (IST)
- PIN: 208 027
- Literacy: 82%
- Lok Sabha constituency: Kanpur Urban
- Vidhan Sabha constituency: Govind Nagar
- Civic agency: Kanpur Municipal Corporation, Kanpur Development Authority, Barra Police Station
- Website: KDA, Kanpur Nagar Nigam/

Barra is a neighbourhood in the extreme southern part of Kanpur, Uttar Pradesh. It is surrounded by Ratan Lal Nagar in the west, Govind Nagar in the north, and Kidwai Nagar in the east, and Jarouli in the south. Barra is divided into sections such as Barra Gaon, Barra-1, Barra-2, Barra-3, Barra-4, Barra-5, Barra-6, Barra-7, Barra-8, and Barra World Bank. Barra-8 is the largest section among them.

Barra has some good schools such as Sardar Patel Inter College, Puranchandra Vidyaniketan, The Chintels School, Karam Devi Memorial Academy (KDMA), Delhi Public School (DPS), Mary jesus education centre (MJEC), Acme public school (APS), etc. It is also the educational hub of South Kanpur.

Barra also has few Nationalised Banks such as State Bank Of India, Union Bank of India, Allahabad Bank, Bank Of Baroda, Indian Overseas Bank, Syndicate Bank, Nainital Bank, and Dena Bank.
