= Ratan Lal Nagar =

- Suburb
- Nickname: Southern Suburb of Kanpur
- Country: India
- State: Uttar Pradesh
- District: Kanpur

Population
  - Total: 80,000

Languages
  - Official: Hindi
- Time zone: UTC+5:30 (IST)
- PIN: 208 022
- Vehicle registration: UP-78
- Nearest city: Kanpur
- Lok Sabha constituency: Kanpur Urban
- Vidhan Sabha constituency: Govind Nagar
- Civic agency: Govind Nagar Police Station
- Website: up.gov.in

Ratan Lal Nagar is a neighbourhood in the extreme southern part of Kanpur, Uttar Pradesh. It is surrounded by Gujaini and Ravidaspuram in south, Sanjay Nagar and Dada Nagar in north, Barra, Govind Nagar and Juhi in east and Dabouli in West. Ratan Lal Nagar is approximately 10 km from Kanpur Central railway station and approximately 3 km from Govindpuri Railway Station.This neighbourhood was named after the local politician Ratan Lal Sharma. It is home to some good schools such as Harmilap Mission School, Doon International School, Radhakrishan Memorial School and Chintels School. Branches of few Nationalised Banks such as State Bank of India and its subsidiary State Bank of Bikaner and Jaipur, Bank of India and Bank of Baroda and Branch Office of Life Insurance Corporation of India are also situated here.

This neighborhood is home to several officials of State Bank of India as it has three different sub-localities called State Bank Colonies. The main market of this neighbourhood are Jaina Place and KDA market.
