= Bank of Baroda Uganda Limited =

Commercial bank in Uganda

- Type: Public: USE: BOBU
- Industry: Banking, capital markets, finance
- Founded: 1953; 73 years ago
- Headquarters: 18 Kampala Road; Kampala, Uganda
- Key people: Vastina Rukimirana Nsanze; Chairperson; Shashi Dhar; CEO and Managing Director
- Products: Loans, credit cards, savings, investments
- Revenue: ▲Aftertax: USh 115,966,074,000/= (US$30,875,300) (2023)
- Total assets: USh 2,804,828,346,000/= (US$746,769,400) (2023)
- Owner: Bank of Baroda (80%)
- Number of employees: 188 (2011)
- Website: Homepage

The Bank of Baroda Uganda Limited (BOBU), is a commercial bank in Uganda that is majority owned by the Indian government owned banking and financial service conglomerate Bank of Baroda. BOBU is one of the commercial banks licensed by the Bank of Uganda, the central bank and national banking regulator.

== Overview ==
BOBU is involved in all aspects of commercial banking, focusing on large corporations, small and medium enterprises, and individuals. BOBU is a subsidiary of the Bank of Baroda (BoB), an international bank with headquarters in Mumbai, India. BOBU is listed on the Uganda Securities Exchange (USE) where it trades under the symbol "BOBU". As of December 2023, the bank had total assets of USh2,804,828,346,000/= (approx. US$746,769,400), with shareholders' equity of USh708,851,014,000/= (approx. US$188,728,000).

== History ==
BoB opened its first overseas branches in Mombasa, Kenya and Kampala, Uganda in 1953. BOBU commenced operations in Uganda on 18 December 1953, initially as an overseas branch of BoB. On 1 November 1969, BOBU was incorporated in Uganda. In 1972, BOBU acquired the banking business of the Bank of India Uganda Limited, and the government of Uganda acquired a 49 percent shareholding in BOBU, leaving BoB with a 51 percent shareholding. In 1999, the government divested its 49 percent shareholding, returning full ownership of BOBU to BoB. In November 2002, BOBU offered 20 percent of its shares to institutional and private investors on the Uganda Securities Exchange (USE) through an initial public offering.

== Subsidiaries ==
BOBU owns all of Baroda Capital Markets (Uganda) Limited, which was established in 1993. The subsidiary is a broker/dealer in capital markets and is licensed by Uganda's Capital Markets Authority (CMA). The Baroda brokerage is a member of the CMA Governing Council.

== Ownership ==
The following table shows the ten largest shareholders of BBU stock, as of 31 December 2022.

Bank of Baroda Uganda Stock Ownership
Rank	Name of Owner	Per centage Ownership
1	Bank of Baroda of India	80.00
2	Sudhir Ruparelia	2.50
3	DFCU Bank Limited	2.36
4	National Social Security Fund (Uganda)	2.10
5	King Ceasor Augustus Mulenga	1.82
6	Charles Michael Mbire	0.94
7	Jesseph Mbyambara Byamugisha	0.63
8	Andrew Muhimbise	0.56
9	Bank of Uganda Employee Benefits Scheme	0.40
10	Jobanputra Mandakini Kishor	0.40
11	Others	8.20
	Total	100.0

- Note: Totals may be slightly off due to rounding.

== Branch network ==
As of December 2023, BOBU had a branch network in all parts of Uganda, including:

1. Head Office - 18 Kampala Road, Kampala (Main Branch)
2. Arua Branch - KKT Plaza, 6-22 Duka Road, Arua
3. Railway Station Branch - Esso Corner, 6 Jinja Road, Kampala
4. Industrial Area Branch - 37–43 Mulwana Road, Kampala
5. Kololo Branch - 31 Kira Road, Kololo, Kampala
6. Kansanga Branch - 70/378 Kampala–Ggaba Road, Kansanga, Kampala
7. Ovino Market Branch - 24–28 Rashid Khamis Road, Old Kampala, Kampala
8. Kawempe Branch - Shree Hari Complex, 35/36 Kawempe-Bombo Road, Kawempe
9. Entebbe Branch - 24 Gower's Road, Entebbe
10. Mukono Branch - 59-67 Kampala-Jinja Road, Mukono
11. Jinja Branch - 16 a&b Iganga Road, Jinja
12. Lugazi Branch - SCOUL Secondary School Premises, Jinja Road, Lugazi
13. Iganga Branch - 84A & 84B Main Street, Iganga
14. Mbale Branch - Baroda House, 3 Pallisa Road, Mbale
15. Mbarara Branch - 11 Masaka Road, Mbarara
16. Kabale Branch - 94 Kabale Road, Kabale
17. Lira Branch - 2 Aputi Road, Lira, Uganda.

== See also ==
- List of banks in Uganda
- Banking in Uganda
- Bank of Baroda Tanzania Limited
- Bank of Baroda Kenya Limited
