= Kampala Speke Hotel =

Hotel in Kampala, Uganda

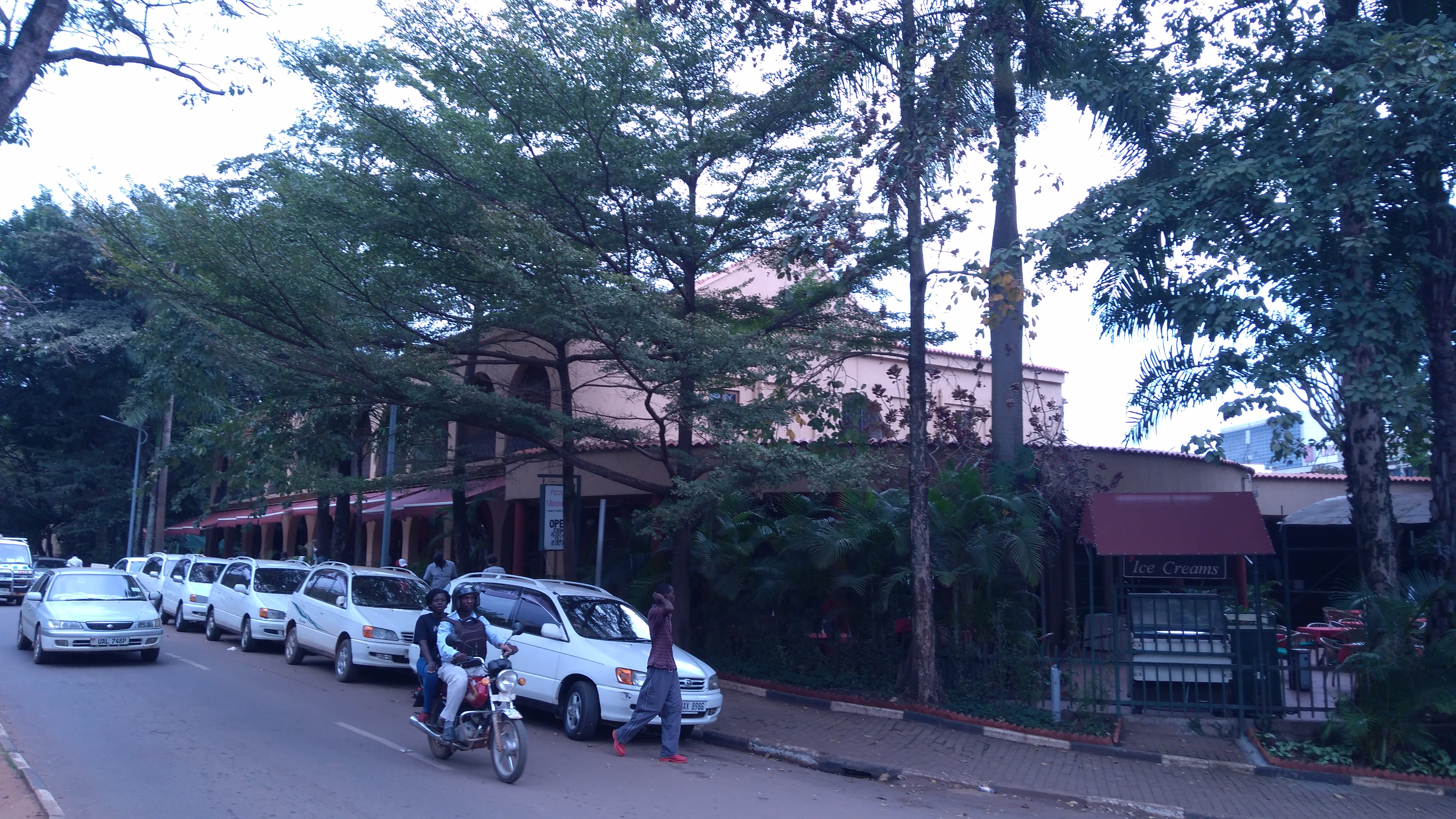
- Interactive map of the Kampala Speke Hotel area

General information
- Location: 7-9 Nile Avenue, Kampala, Uganda
- Coordinates: 00°18′55″N 32°34′58″E
- Opening: 1925
- Owner: Ruparelia Group
- Management: Ruparelia Group

Other information
- Number of rooms: 50
- Number of restaurants: 4

Website
- Homepage

Kampala Speke Hotel is a hotel in Kampala, the capital and largest city in Uganda, the third-largest economy in the East African Community.

== Location ==
The hotel is located in the heart of Kampala, at 7-9 Nile Avenue, on Nakasero Hill, close to the Grand Imperial Hotel and the Kampala Sheraton Hotel. This location is close to banks, shopping arcades and offices, in the middle of Kampala's central business district. The coordinates of Kampala Speke Hotel are:0°18'55.0"N, 32°34'58.0"E (Latitude:0.315278; Longitude:32.582778).

== Overview ==
Speke Hotel is named after John Hanning Speke, the first European to lay his eyes on the Source of the Nile. It is one of the oldest hotels in Uganda, built in the 1920s. Over the years, despite numerous renovations and upgrades, Speke Hotel has retained its colonial ambiance. The hotel has fifty en-suite rooms, several themed restaurants (including Italian and Indian) and a cocktail bar.

== Ownership ==
The hotel is a member of the Ruparelia Group, which includes four other hotels in Kampala. As of July 2014, the hotels of the Ruparelia Group include:

- Speke Resort and Conference Center – Munyonyo, Kampala
- Munyonyo Commonwealth Resort – Munyonyo, Kampala
- Kampala Speke Hotel – Kampala
- Kabira Country Club – Bukoto, Kampala
- Forest Cottages – Kampala
- Bukoto Heights Apparments- Kampala
- Dolphin Suites – Kampala

== See also ==
- Ruparelia Group
- Sudhir Ruparelia
- Nakasero Hill
- Uganda Hotels
