= Bank of Baroda Tanzania Limited =

- Type: Private
- Industry: Banking, capital markets, finance
- Founded: 1956
- Headquarters: 139/42 Ohio Road at Sokoine Drive, Dar es Salaam, Tanzania
- Key people: Debadatta Chand; Chairman; Aditya Narayan Singh; MD
- Products: Loans, credit cards, savings, investments
- Revenue: ▼Aftertax:TSh 2.08 billion (2021)
- Total assets: TSh 229 billion (2021)
- Number of employees: 48 (2017)
- Website: bankofbaroda.co.tz

The Bank of Baroda Tanzania Limited (BBTL), also known as the Bank of Baroda Tanzania, is a commercial bank in Tanzania. It is one of the commercial banks licensed by the Bank of Tanzania, the national banking regulator.

== Overview ==
BBTL is involved in all aspects of commercial banking, including serving large corporations, small and medium enterprises, and individuals. BBTL is a subsidiary of the Bank of Baroda (BoB), an international bank with headquarters in Mumbai, India. As of 31 December 2017, BBTL had assets valued at TSh 170 billion (approx. US$76 million). As of 31 December 2016, the shareholder's capital was TSh 35.33 billion (approx. US$16 million).

== History ==
BoB opened its first branch in Tanganyika in 1956. By 1967, the bank had three branches, one each of the cities of Dar es Salaam, Mwanza and Moshi. In February 1967, the bank was nationalized.

In October 2004 BBTL was re-established as a subsidiary of BoB, with a single branch in Dar es Salaam. Three years later, in August 2007, a second branch was established in Arusha, with the third branch following in Dar es Salaam in June 2013 and the fourth branch in Mwanza in July 2014.

== Branch network ==
As of January 2018, BBTL had a branch network at the following locations:

(a) Head Office: 149/32 Ohio Road at Sokoine Drive, Dar es Salaam (b) Kariakoo Market Branch: Kariakoo Market, 8/13 Mafia Street, Dar es Salaam (c) Arusha Branch: 12E Goliondoi Street, Arusha and (d) Mwanza Branch: 153T Kenyatta Street, Mwanza

== See also ==
- List of banks in Tanzania
- Economy of Tanzania
- Bank of Baroda Uganda Limited
- Bank of Baroda Kenya Limited
