= Vikramajit Singh Sanatan Dharma College =

College in Kanpur, Uttar Pradesh, India

- Established: 1921
- Academic affiliations: Chhatrapati Shahu Ji Maharaj University
- Principal: DrNeeru Tandon
- Location: Nawabganj, Kanpur, Uttar Pradesh, 280002, India
- Website: vssdcollege.ac.in

Vikramajit Singh Sanatan Dharma College (VSSD college), formerly Sanatan Dharma College, is situated on the right bank of the Ganges river at Nawabganj in Kanpur, Uttar Pradesh, India. It was established in 1921.

== Affiliations ==
At first, the college was affiliated to Allahabad University and Agra University. In the year 1968, it became affiliated to Kanpur University (now Chhatrapati Shahu Ji Maharaj University).

== Hostel ==
Hostel facility for Girl's & Boy's is available in VSSD College.

== Notable Alumni ==
Deendayal Upadhyaya⁣ – Indian Thinker

Shobha Ram Kumawat- Former Member of Lok Sabha

Vinay Katiyar - Former Member of Parliament, founder - president of Bajrang Dal

Satyadev Pachauri - Member of Parliament

S. N. Chak- IPS Officer

Neelima Katiyar - Member of legislative Assembly

Sunil Dutt Dwivedi - Member of legislative Assembly

Surendra Maithani - Member of legislative Assembly

Shyam Bihari Misra - Indian Politician

Rajeev shukla- Vice president of BCCI

== Faculties ==
The college is composed of the following faculties:

- Arts
- Science
- Commerce
- Dled, B.Ed, M.Ed
- Physical Education
- Law-LLB, B.A.LL.B
- BBA
- BCA
