= Satyadev Pachauri =

Indian politician

Member of Parliament, Lok Sabha
- In office 23 May 2019 – 4 June 2024
- Preceded by: Dr. Murli Manohar Joshi
- Succeeded by: Ramesh Awasthi
- Constituency: Kanpur

Minister of MSME, Khadi & Sericulture, Government of Uttar Pradesh
- In office 19 March 2017 – 17 June 2019
- Succeeded by: Satish Mahana

Member of Legislative Assembly, Uttar Pradesh
- In office 6 March 2012 – 5 June 2019
- Preceded by: Ajay Kapoor
- Succeeded by: Surendra Maithani
- Constituency: Govind Nagar
- In office 1991–1993
- Preceded by: Reshma Arif
- Succeeded by: Mahesh Balmiki
- Constituency: Arya Nagar

Personal details
- Born: 12 August 1948 (age 76); Bhind, Madhya Bharat, India
- Political party: Bharatiya Janata Party
- Spouse: Rama Pachauri
- Children: Two Sons, Two Daughters
- Education: M. Sc. (Chemistry)
- Website: satyadevpachauri.in

Satyadev Pachauri is an Indian politician and the former Minister of Khadi, Village Industries, Sericulture, Textile, Micro, Small & Medium Enterprises and Export Promotion in the Government of Uttar Pradesh. He was the Member of Parliament from Kanpur parliamentary constituency of Uttar Pradesh.

== Early life ==
Pachauri was born on 12 August 1948 in a traditional Brahmin family of Pandit Pyarelal Pachauri at village Mihona dist. Bhind (M.P). He completed M.Sc. in Chemistry from VSSD College during that time he was elected as The Student President. He started his political career in 1967 with Akhil Bharatiya Vidyarthi Parishad. In 1991 he was elected to Uttar Pradesh Legislative Assembly first time from Arya Nagar constituency of Kanpur Nagar district.

== Controversy ==
He was involved in a controversy for publicly ridiculing a female disabled employee when noted disability activist Satendra Singh (doctor) filed the first ever case under the new Rights of Persons with Disabilities Act, 2016.
