= Lawrence Coreta Muganga =

Ugandan writer and academic administrator

Lawrence Muganga
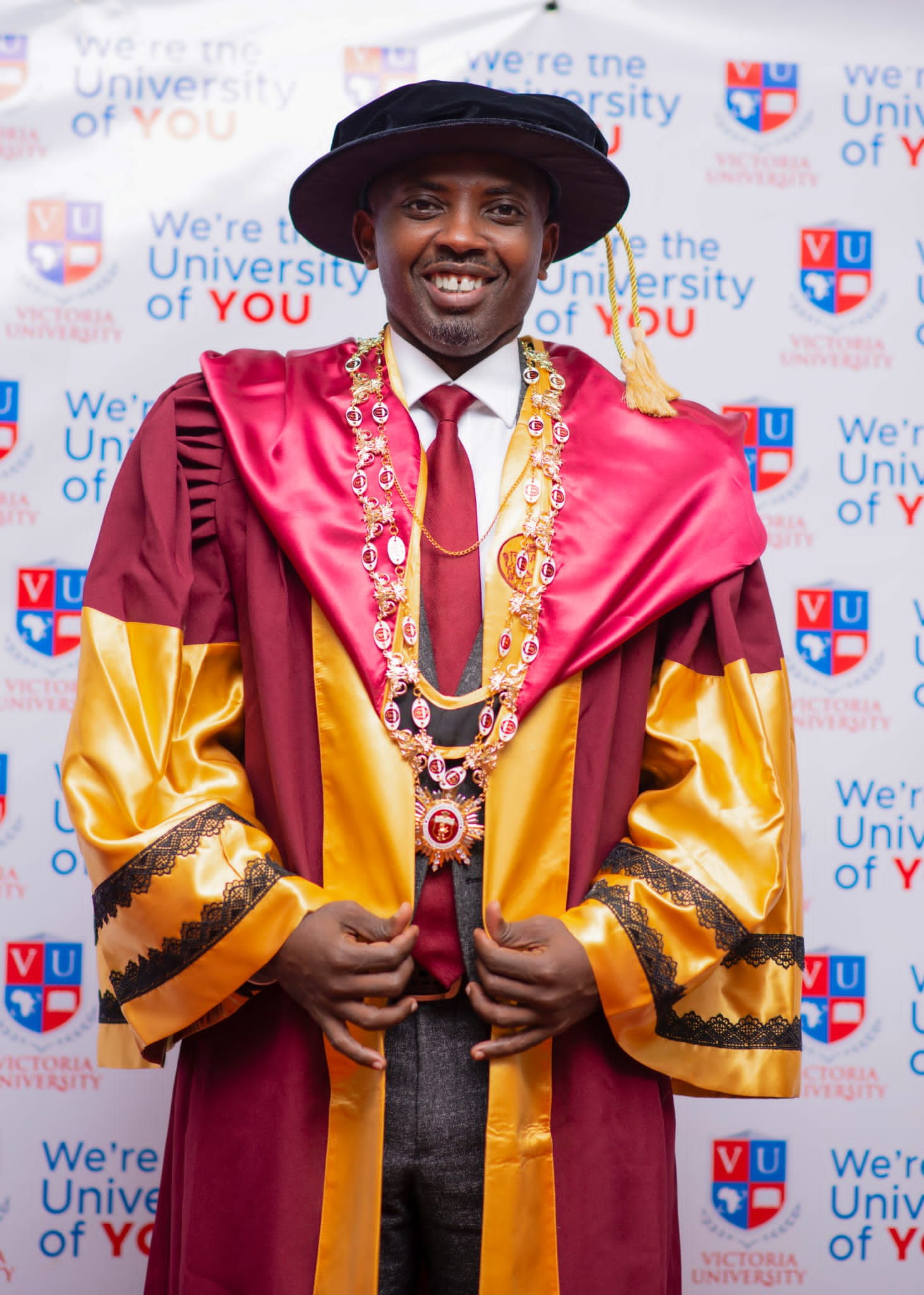
- Dr Lawrence Muganga
- Born: Lawrence Coreta Muganga; Mukono District, Uganda
- Citizenship: Uganda, Canada
- Education: Makerere University (Bachelor in Social Sciences) (Master of Arts in Economic Policy Management); Harvard University (Higher Education Teaching Certification); University of Alberta (Masters in Adult Education) (PhD in Educational Administration and Leadership)
- Occupations: author, University administrator
- Years active: 2000–present
- Known for: Authoring, Researching Academic leadership,

Lawrence Muganga is a Ugandan-Canadian scholar, digital economy educationist, academic administrator who serves as the Vice Chancellor of Victoria University Uganda. He is the author of "You Can't Make Fish Climb Trees", "From Chalk to Chatbots" as well as "Aunthetic University".

== Background and education ==
He was born in the Mukono District and grew up in the Masaka District. He completed his O Level from Mende Kalema Secondary School and A level from St. Charles Lwanga Kasasa Secondary School in Masaka District. He holds a Bachelor of Social Sciences in Economics and a Master of Arts in Economic Policy Management from Makerere University Uganda. He graduated with a Higher Education Teaching Certificate from Harvard University. He holds a Master in Education specialising in Adult Education plus a PhD in Educational Administration and Leadership from the University of Alberta Canada. He holds a dual citizenship of Uganda and Canada.

== Career ==
After his graduation from Makerere University in 2002, Muganga moved to Rwanda and worked in Rwanda Revenue Authority as an Internal Auditor (2003–2005). He worked as a Project Manager at Edmonton Multicultural Coalition, he also served as a Policy Advisor for the Government of Alberta in Canada. Muganga has held several teaching, consulting and professional positions in Canada, Ethiopia, Rwanda, Finland, Singapore, Sweden, US and Solomon Islands majorly focusing on researching, planning, developing, implementing, and assessing policies that contribute towards human capital development and improving the quality of life for populations. In 2020, he was appointed as the new Vice Chancellor for Victoria University Uganda.

== Research ==
He has published the finding of his educational research in educational journals and other peer publications.

== Grant ==
In 2019, Muganga published a book called "You Can't Make Fish Climb Trees" and won a grant of $1.3 million from the Bill and Melinda Gates Foundation.

== Controversies ==
On 2 September 2021, he was arrested by the Ugandan joint security forces from his office for espionage and illegal stay in the country but he was freed 2 days later without any charge.
