= Ajay Kapoor =

Ajay Kapoor may refer to:

- Ajay Kapoor (Neighbours), a character from the Australian television soap opera Neighbours
- Ajay Kapoor (politician) (born 1967), Indian politician
- Ajay Kapoor, fictional character portrayed by Akshay Kumar in the 2001 Indian film Ek Rishtaa: The Bond of Love
