= Munyonyo Commonwealth Resort =

Hotel in Kampala, Uganda

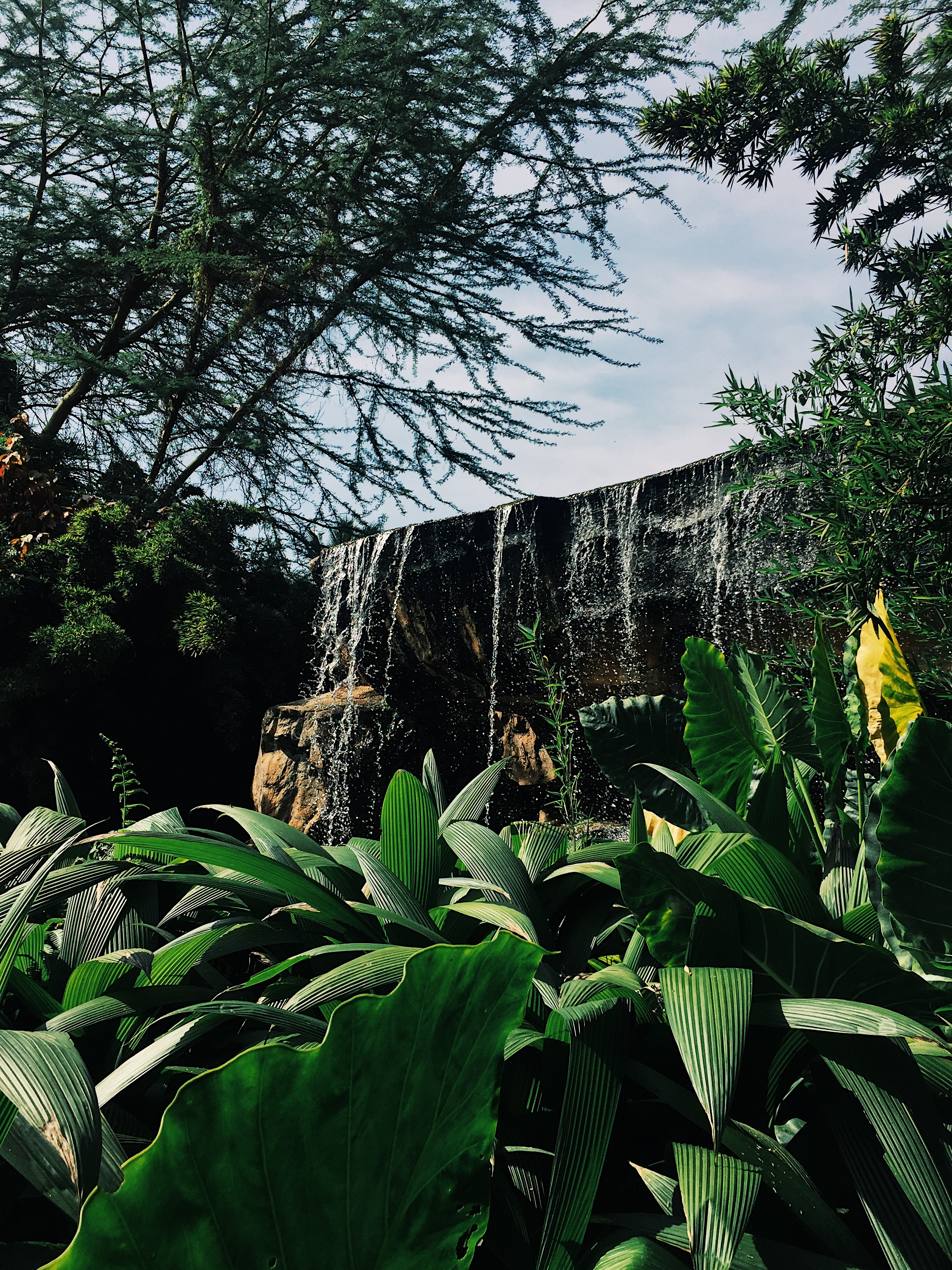
- Munyonyo Commonwealth Resort water fall

- Location within Uganda

General information
- Location: Munyonyo, Kampala, Uganda
- Coordinates: 00°14′11″N 32°37′25″E
- Opening: 2007
- Owner: Ruparelia Group
- Operator: Ruparelia Group

Other information
- Number of restaurants: 7

Website
- Homepage

Munyonyo Commonwealth Resort is a five star hotel-resort in Kampala, the capital and largest city in Uganda, the third-largest economy in the East African Community.

== Location ==
The resort is located in the neighborhood of Munyonyo, in Makindye Division, in the southeastern part of Kampala, along the northern shores of Lake Victoria, the second-largest freshwater lake in the world. It is located adjacent to Speke Resort and Conference Center. This location lies approximately 12 kilometres (7 mi), by road, southeast of Kampala's central business district. The coordinates of Munyonyo Commonwealth Resort are:0°14'11.0"N, 32°37'25.0"E (Latitude:0.236389; Longitude:32.623611).

== Overview ==
The resort was commissioned in 2007 and served as the host venue of the Commonwealth Heads of Government Meeting 2007 (CHOGM 2007), held from 23 November until 25 November 2007, in Kampala Uganda. Built at an estimated cost of US$30 million (USh60 billion), the Uganda government contributed at least US$7.5 million (USh15 billion) into the joint venture entity that developed the resort. Government spent another US$7 million (USh14 billion) on constructing pathways and widening roads within the complex. The marina was expanded and the security of the infrastructure was updated. The US$7.5 million has been treated as equity by government while the US$7 million was treated as Conference expenses.

== Ownership ==
The hotel is a member of the Ruparelia Group, which includes four other hotels in Kampala. As of July 2014, the hotels of the Ruparelia Group include:

- Speke Resort and Conference Center - Munyonyo, Kampala
- Kampala Speke Hotel - Nile Avenue, Kampala
- Kabira Country Club - Bukoto, Kampala
- Kampala Tourist Hotel - Luwum Street, Kampala

== See also ==
- KCCA
- Ruparelia Group
- Sudhir Ruparelia
- Kampala
- Makindye Division
