= Pearl of Africa Tourism Expo =

Ugandan Tourism Expo

- Time: (UTC+3)
- Duration: 3 days
- Venue: Speke Resort Munyonyo
- Location: Kampala
- Also known as: POATE
- Patron: Ministry of Tourism, Wildlife and Antiquities
- Organized by: Uganda Tourism Board
- Participants: Tourism stakeholders, exhibitors, hosted buyers, investors, media representatives
- Website: www.poate.co.ug

POATE is an annual tourism and travel trade exhibition that is organized by the Uganda Tourism Board (UTB). The expo serves as Uganda's flagship tourism marketing and business networking event, bringing together tourism stakeholders, hosted buyers, exhibitors, investors, media representatives, and government agencies from Uganda and abroad.

The expo promotes Uganda under the national brand slogan “Explore Uganda, The Pearl of Africa”. It features B2B and B2C engagements, exhibitions, destination marketing forums, panel discussions, cultural showcases, and networking sessions.

== History ==
POATE was established by the Uganda Tourism Board to strengthen Uganda's tourism sector and boost international arrivals. It has grown into one of East Africa's key tourism marketplace events, attracting regional and international tour operators, airlines, hospitality providers, conservation organizations, and travel media.

== Organization ==
POATE is organized annually by the Uganda Tourism Board under the Ministry of Tourism, Wildlife and Antiquities. It is typically hosted at Speke Resort Munyonyo (also referred to as Commonwealth Resort) in Kampala.

== POATE 2026 (10th Edition) ==
The 2026 edition (10th edition) is taking place from 21 to 23 May 2026 at Speke Resort Munyonyo under the theme “Wanderlust - It’s Your Time to Thrive”.

It aims to position Uganda as a leading destination for sustainable, inclusive, and community-led tourism. The event opened with cultural fanfare and high-level participation, including remarks from President Museveni.

== POATE 2025 (9th Edition) ==
The 2025 edition was held from 21 to 23 May 2025 at Speke Resort Munyonyo. It featured hundreds of exhibitors, international buyers, speakers, and delegates. Activities included investment forums, destination marketing sessions, cultural exhibitions, concerts, and familiarization trips.
