= VUU =

VUU may refer to:

- Victoria University Uganda, in Kampala, Uganda
- Virginia Union University, in Richmond, Virginia, United States
