= Rajiv Ruparelia =

Ugandan businessman and rally driver (1990–2025)

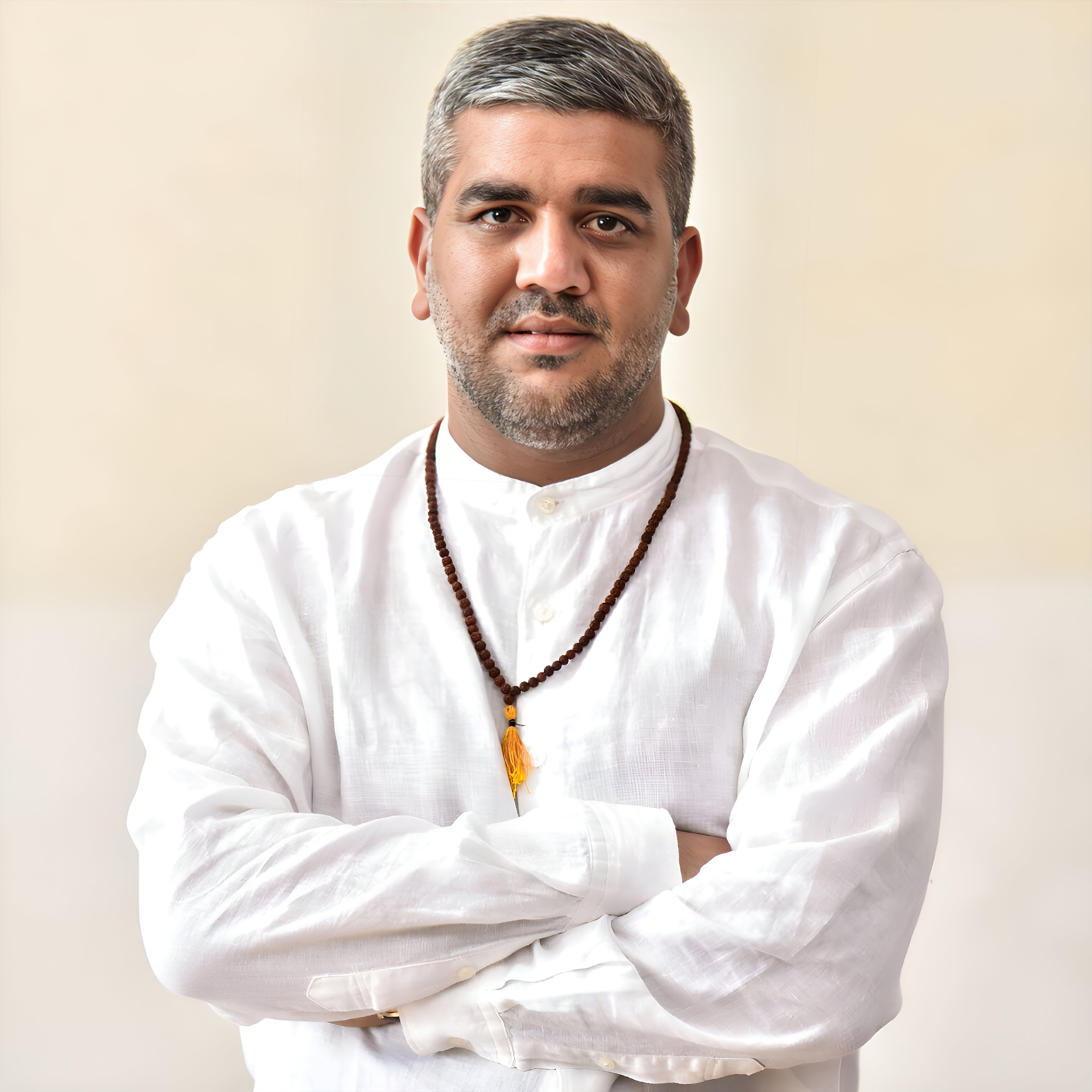
- Rajiv Ruparelia in 2024
- Born: 2 January 1990; Kampala, Uganda
- Died: 3 May 2025 (aged 35); Makindye-Ssabagabo, Wakiso District, Uganda
- Education: Regent's University London
- Occupations: Businessman, Rally Driver
- Years active: 2010s–2025
- Employer: Ruparelia Group
- Known for: Managing Ruparelia Group; Ugandan Motorsport
- Title: Managing Director, Ruparelia Group
- Spouse: Naiya Khagram (m. 2017)
- Children: 1 daughter

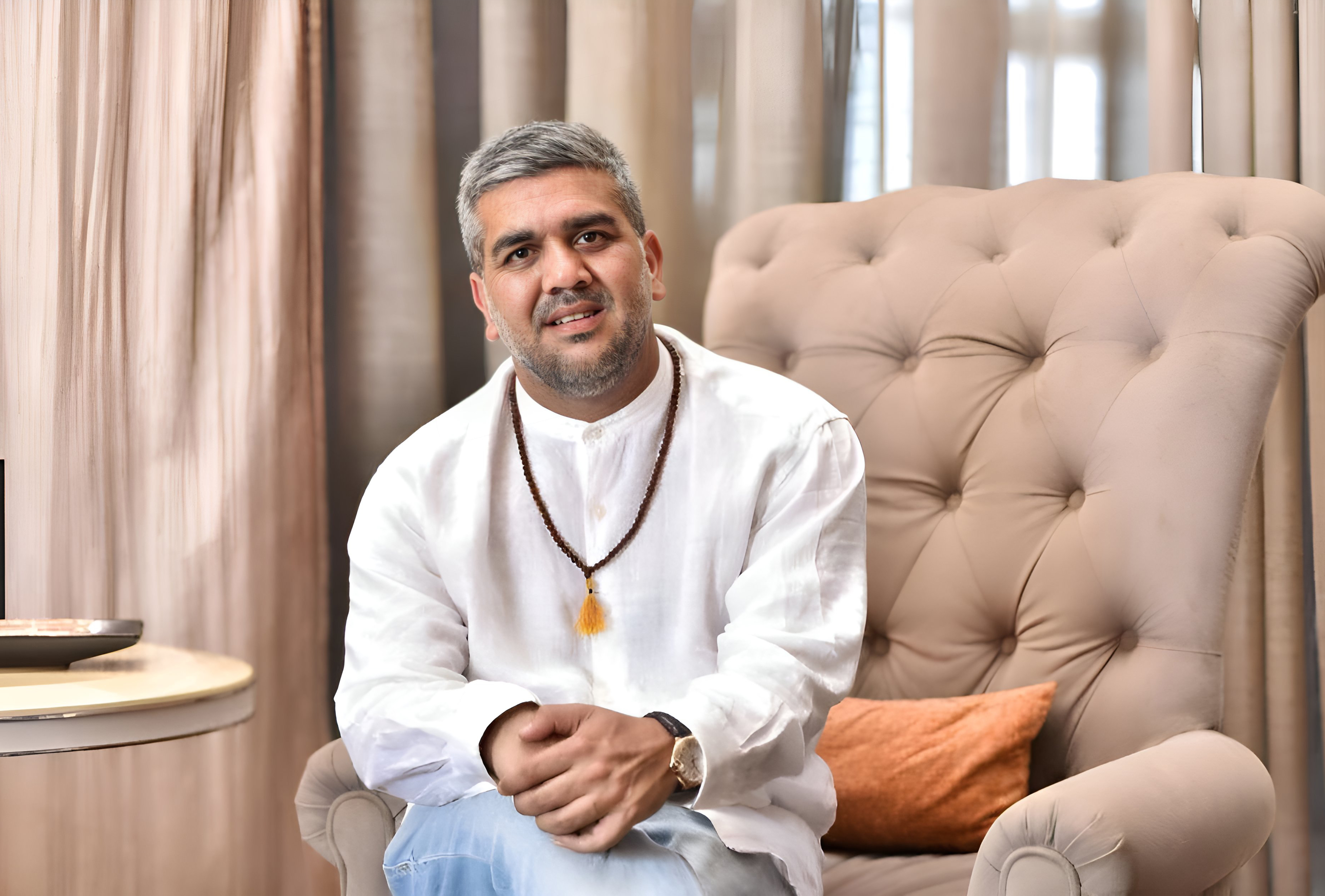
Rajiv Ruparelia

Rajiv Ruparelia (2 January 1990 – 3 May 2025) was a Ugandan businessman and rally driver. He was a son to Sudhir Ruparelia and served as managing director of the Ruparelia Group, a private conglomerate in Uganda with interests in real estate, education, hospitality, and finance.

== Background and education ==
Rajiv was born on 2 January 1990 to Jyotsna Ruparelia (mother) and Sudhir Ruparelia (father). He was a younger brother to Sheena and Meera.

Rajiv attended Dean Close School in Cheltenham, UK, and graduated from Regent's University London with a Bachelor's in Financial Management.

== Business career ==
Rajiv joined the family-owned Ruparelia Group in 2014. In 2017 he was appointed the Group's Managing Director. He oversaw operations in several subsidiaries, including Kampala Parents' School, which listed him as managing director.

== Motorsport ==
Rajiv was active in Uganda's motorsport scene. He started to compete in motorsport rallies in 2019 after which he become the patron of the Central Motorsport Club (CMC). He won several local rally events and became recognized in the Ugandan motorsport. He used to drive a Volkswagen Polo Proto imported from Poland.

=== Results ===
Event	Year	Result / Time / Details
Debut - Enduro Autocross Championship, Zion Estates, Ssisa	May 2019	2nd place in his first competition rally; time 10:44.
Kayunga Autocross, FMU	June 2019	1st place, time 05:18.5, driving a VW Polo Proto; second place Ponsiano Lwakataka at 05:22.2.
Kapeeka Autocross Rally	August 2019	Winner of the Auto Cross Rally in Kapeeka.
Kalanga Rally (Kalangala Circuit)	2019	Winner; won all runs.
Mbarara Rally (Rukaari-Lake Mburo Mbarara Rally)	2020	Won Day One of Mbarara Rally; posted fastest times in Day One (13:17.74) with navigator Enock Olinga.
Kabalega Rally (Hoima)	October 2021	First National Rally Championship (NRC) event win. Time: approximately 1:45:41. He won six of the seven stages.

== Personal life ==
Rajiv married Naiya Khagram in London in 2017. The couple had one daughter. He supported philanthropic work through the Ruparelia Foundation and was involved in educational sponsorships and youth support projects including Kampala Parents' School, Kampala International School Uganda, and Delhi Public School International.

== Death ==
On 3 May 2025, Rajiv died in a car accident on the Kampala-Entebbe Expressway near the Busabala flyover, Makindye-Ssabagabo, Wakiso District. Police reported that he was driving a Nissan GT-R (Reg. UAT 658H) of which he lost control. It collided with a concrete barrier, overturned, and caught fire, killing him instantly. He was cremated on 6 May 2025 at the Hindu Crematorium in Lugogo, Kampala. A police report on the accident was delivered to his family in August 2025.
