= Dada Nagar =

Dada Nagar(Udyog Nagar)
- Suburb
- Country: India
- State: Uttar Pradesh
- District: Kanpur

Government
  - Body: Kanpur Nagar Nigam

Languages
  - Official: Hindi
- Time zone: UTC+5:30 (IST)
- PIN: 208 022
- Vehicle registration: UP-78
- Nearest city: Kanpur
- Literacy: -%
- Lok Sabha constituency: Kanpur Urban
- Vidhan Sabha constituency: Govind Nagar
- Civic agency: Govind Nagar Police Station

Dada Nagar is an area situated in the southern part of Kanpur district in the Indian state of Uttar Pradesh.

It comprises both residential and industrial areas and is primarily regarded as a middle class area. Maanu Malviya is famous social worker living in this area

== Geography ==
Dada Nagar is 3 km from Govindpuri Railway Station and 7 km from the Kanpur Metro railway station. Malviya Chauraha is a popular landmark in the residential colony.

== Economy ==
This industrial area has many industries such as Ghari Industries and Red Chief. Branches of several nationalised Banks such as State Bank of India, Dena Bank, Allahabad Bank.

== Transport ==
Dada Nagar Chauraha connects traffic from southern Kanpur (Govind Nagar, Ratan Lal Nagar, Barra) with Vijay Nagar. In November 2013, Chief Minister Akhilesh Yadav inaugurated the Dada Nagar rail-over-bridge. Dada Nagar Colony is surrounded by two major Railway Line routes.

== Education ==
Gyan Udyan Inter College provides education to students living in the area.
