= Govind Nagar Assembly constituency =

Constituency of the Uttar Pradesh legislative assembly in India

Govind Nagar
- Constituency No. 212 for the Uttar Pradesh Legislative Assembly

Constituency details
- Country: India
- Region: North India
- State: Uttar Pradesh
- District: Kanpur Nagar
- Total electors: 3,62,102 (2024)
- Reservation: None

Member of Legislative Assembly
- 18th Uttar Pradesh Legislative Assembly
- Incumbent Surendra Maithani
- Party: Bharatiya Janata Party
- Elected year: 2022
- Preceded by: Satya Dev Pachauri

Govind Nagar Assembly constituency is one of 403 legislative assemblies of the Uttar Pradesh. It is part of the Kanpur Lok Sabha constituency.

== Overview ==
Govindnagar comprises Armapur Estate (CT), Wards No. 11, 19, 22, 37, 42, 48, 49, 50, 59, 60, 61, 80, 85, 92, and 101 in Kanpur Municipal Corporation of 2-Kanpur Sadar Tehsil.

== Members of Legislative Assembly ==
Year	Member	Party
1967	Prabhakar Tripathi	Indian National Congress
1969	Prabhakar Tripathi	Indian National Congress
1974	Sant Singh Yusuf	Communist Party of India
1977	Ganesh Dutt Vajpayee	Janata Party
1980	Vilayati Ram Katyal	Indian National Congress (I)
1985	Vilayati Ram Katyal	Indian National Congress
1989	Bal Chandra Misra	Bharatiya Janata Party
1991	Bal Chandra Misra	Bharatiya Janata Party
1993	Bal Chandra Misra	Bharatiya Janata Party
1996	Bal Chandra Misra	Bharatiya Janata Party
2002	Ajay Kapoor	Indian National Congress
2007	Ajay Kapoor	Indian National Congress
2012	Satya Dev Pachauri	Bharatiya Janata Party
2017	Satya Dev Pachauri	Bharatiya Janata Party
2019^	Surendra Maithani	Bharatiya Janata Party
2022	Surendra Maithani	Bharatiya Janata Party

- *By Election

== Election results ==
=== 2027 ===
2027 Uttar Pradesh Legislative Assembly election: Govind Nagar
Party	Candidate	Votes	%	±%
BJP				
INDIA				
BSP				
NOTA	None of the above			
Majority				
Turnout				
gain from		Swing		

=== 2022 ===
2022 Uttar Pradesh Legislative Assembly election: Govind Nagar
Party	Candidate	Votes	%	±%
BJP	Surendra Maithani	117,501	61.13	+11.04
SP	Samrat Vikash Yadav	36,605	19.05	+9.14
INC	Karishma Thakur	26,267	13.67	−18.76
BSP	Ashok Kumar Kaliya	8,333	4.34	−0.18
AAP	Kawardeep Singh	2,141	1.11	
NOTA	None of the above	1,094	0.57	−0.26
Majority		80,896	42.08	+24.42
Turnout		192,202	54.66	+21.24
BJP hold		Swing		

=== 2019 bypoll ===
By-Election, 2019: Govind Nagar
Party	Candidate	Votes	%	±%
BJP	Surendra Maithani	60,237	50.09	
INC	Karishma Thakur	38,993	32.43	
SP	Samrat Vikash Yadav	11,915	9.91	
BSP	Devi Prasad Tewari	5,434	4.52	
Independent	Devendra Kumar Singh	1,524	1.27	
NOTA	None of the above	1,004	0.83	
Majority		21,244	17.66	
Turnout		120,255	33.42	
BJP hold		Swing		

=== 2017 ===
U. P. Legislative Assembly Election, 2017: Govind Nagar
Party	Candidate	Votes	%	±%
BJP	Satya Dev Pachauri	112,029	60.47	
INC	Ambuj Shukla	40,520	21.87	
BSP	Nirmal Tiwari	28,795	15.54	
NOTA	None of the above	1,247	0.68	
Majority		71,509	38.6	
Turnout		185,258	53.06	
BJP hold		Swing	+25.14	

=== 2012 ===
U. P. Legislative Assembly Election, 2012: Govind Nagar
Party	Candidate	Votes	%	±%
BJP	Satya Dev Pachauri	57,156	35.33	+6.43
INC	Dr. Shailendra Dixit	44,779	27.68	−17.93
BSP	Sachin Tripathi	30,963	19.14	+9.53
SP	Ashok Anshwani	16,424	10.15	−2.77
Independent	Balvir Singh	1,494	0.92	+0.92
Majority		12,377	7.65	−9.05
Turnout		1,61,755	49.20	+10.75
BJP gain from INC		Swing	-10.28	

=== 2007 ===
U. P. Legislative Assembly Election, 2007: Govind Nagar
Party	Candidate	Votes	%	±%
INC	Ajay Kapoor	110,478	45.61	
BJP	Hanuman Mishra	70,018	28.90	
SP	Virendra Dubey	31,293	12.92	
BSP	Rajendra Kumar Tiwari	23,274	9.61	
Independent	Ajay Awasthi	2,232	0.92	
Majority		40,460	16.70	
Turnout		2,42,228	38.45	
INC hold		Swing		

=== 2002 ===
U. P. Legislative Assembly Election, 2002: Govind Nagar
Party	Candidate	Votes	%	±%
INC	Ajay Kapoor	117,208	56.09	
BJP	Bal Chandra Misra	64,248	30.75	
SP	Jadoogar Om Prakash Sharma	12,748	6.10	
BSP	Lakhan Lal Tripathi	8,330	3.99	
Independent	Sunil Kumar	2,528	1.21	
Majority		52,960	25.34	
Turnout		2,08,956	35.88	
INC gain from BJP		Swing		

=== 1996 ===
U. P. Legislative Assembly Election, 1996: Govind Nagar
Party	Candidate	Votes	%	±%
BJP	Bal Chandra Misra	103,667	52.45	
BSP	Ganga Singh	51,041	25.83	
SP	Om Prakash	32,220	16.30	
Independent	Naveen Pandit	7,112	3.60	
ABHM	Manjul Nigam	678	0.34	
Majority		52,626	23.62	
Turnout		1,97,635	36.24	
BJP hold		Swing		

=== 1993 ===
Uttar Pradesh assembly elections, 1993: Govind Nagar
Party	Candidate	Votes	%	±%
BJP	Bal Chandra Misra	92,493	47.61	
INC	Ajay Kapoor	49,961	25.72	
SP	Virendra Dubey	40,287	20.74	
JD	Suraj Pal Singh Yadav	6,959	3.58	
Independent	Rajesh	370	0.19	
Majority		42,532	21.89	
Turnout		1,94,268	53.47	
BJP hold		Swing		

=== 1991 ===
U. P. Assembly Election, 1991: Govind Nagar
Party	Candidate	Votes	%	±%
BJP	Bal Chandra Misra	56,519	46.24	
INC	Ajay Kapoor	32,207	26.35	
JP	Bishambhar Singh Yadav	16,316	13.35	
JD	Raghu Nath Singh	7,255	5.94	
BSP	Radha Krishna Pal	6,230	5.10	
Majority		24,312	19.89	
Turnout		1,22,234	35.10	
BJP hold		Swing		

=== 1989 ===
U. P. Assembly Election, 1989: Govind Nagar
Party	Candidate	Votes	%	±%
BJP	Bal Chandra Misra	51,706	41.59	
INC	Vidya Rani	25,761	20.72	
JD	Vinod Dixit	20,334	16.36	
Independent	Suraj Pal	7,894	6.35	
CPI	Bipin Kant Tiwari	4,152	3.34	
Majority		25,945	20.87	
Turnout		1,24,323	36.30	
BJP gain from INC		Swing		

=== 1985 ===
U. P. Assembly Election, 1985: Govind Nagar
Party	Candidate	Votes	%	±%
INC	Vilayati Ram Katyal	26,060	40.85	
BJP	Bal Chandra Misra	21,836	34.23	
Independent	Brij Kishore Misra	5,097	7.99	
Independent	Jagdeo Singh	4,725	7.41	
Independent	Triveni Shanker	981	1.54	
Majority		4,224	6.62	
Turnout		63,796	29.83	
INC hold		Swing		

== See also ==
- List of Vidhan Sabha constituencies of Uttar Pradesh
