= Mahesh Trivedi =

Indian politician

Member of the Uttar Pradesh legislative assembly
- Incumbent
- Assumed office 11 March 2022
- Preceded by: Ajay Kapoor
- Constituency: Kidwai Nagar
- In office 11 May 2007 – 5 March 2012
- Preceded by: Kamlesh Pathak
- Constituency: Derapur
- In office 24 February 2002 – 10 May 2007
- Preceded by: Narendra Singh
- Succeeded by: Bhupendra Singh
- Constituency: Rajpur

Personal details
- Born: 20 March 1967 (age 58); Pukhrayan
- Political party: Bharatiya Janata Party
- Spouse: Asha Trivedi
- Children: Three Sons
- Education: B. A.

Mahesh Trivedi is an Indian politician and former Minister of State for Stamp Duty Tax and Entertainment Tax in the Government of Uttar Pradesh. Currently he represents Kidwai Nagar constituency of Kanpur Nagar district in Uttar Pradesh Legislative Assembly. Formerly he represented Rajpur and Derapur constituency of Kanpur Dehat district respectively as an Independent and from Bahujan Samaj Party. In 2012 elections, he unsuccessfully contested from Bhognipur constituency of Kanpur Dehat district.
