= S.S. Yusuf =

Indian politician

Sant Singh Yusuf was an Indian trade unionist and politician.

In the 1920s he organised cotton mill workers unions in Delhi and Bombay. His adopted name combined his paternal Hindu name Sant Singh and Maulana Yusuf, a Muslim alias he had used whilst in clandestine activities in the 1930s. The Communist Party of India sent Sant Singh alias Mohammed Yusuf to Kanpur in 1936, to become a trade union organiser there. On 9 September 1936 he led over 2,000 workers at a strike at the Atherton West Cotton Mills.

Yusuf served as general secretary of the Kanpur Mazdoor Sabha 1937-1938 during the presidency of Harihar Nath Shastri and during the 1937 general strike. Yusuf was elected president of the Kanpur Mazdoor Sabha in 1938, supported by coalition of communist and anti-Shastri Indian National Congress members. At the 21 August 1938 KMS assembly Yusuf obtained 70 votes against 44 for the Congress Socialist Shastri.

Yusuf ran as a candidate for the Kanpur seat in the 1952 Indian general election, finishing in third place with 22.1% of the votes. He led the 1955 strike in Kanpur.

Yusuf won the Kanpur II seat in the 1962 Uttar Pradesh Legislative Assembly election, obtaining 23,119 votes (34.54%). S.S. Yusuf finished in third place in the Govind Nagar seat in the 1967 Uttar Pradesh Legislative Assembly election, obtaining 9,907 votes (17.89%). He won the Govind Nagar seat in the 1974 Uttar Pradesh Legislative Assembly election.

As of the mid-1970s he served as the President of the Uttar Pradesh Trade Union Congress. He served as vice president of the All India Trade Union Congress.

Sant Singh Yusuf died in Kanpur on 6 June 1982 after protracted illness, at the age of 76.
