= Bal Chandra Misra =

Indian politician and cabinet minister

Bal Chandra Misra बाल चन्द्र मिश्र

Minister of State for Labour and Employment, Government of Uttar Pradesh

Minister of State for Food and Civil Supplies, Government of Uttar Pradesh
- In office July 1991 – December 1992

Member of Legislative Assembly, Uttar Pradesh
- In office 1989–2002
- Preceded by: Vilayati Ram Katyal
- Succeeded by: Ajay Kapoor
- Constituency: Govind Nagar

Personal details
- Born: 17 July 1942 (age 83) Munichapra (Uttar Pradesh)J
- Party: Bharatiya Janata Party
- Spouse: Shobha Rani Misra (m. 1962)
- Children: Vijaya Mishra Tiwari (Eldest) Vineeta Mishra Tripathi Sangeeta Mishra Chaturvedi Vaibhav Mishra (Youngest)
- Education: L. L. B.
- Profession: Advocate

Bal Chandra Misra (born 17 July 1942) is an Indian politician and former cabinet minister in the Government of Uttar Pradesh.

== Political career ==
Misra was elected four times as MLA from the Govind Nagar assembly seat of Kanpur as BJP candidate. After the 1996 election, CM Kalyan Singh appointed him as a minister in his cabinet. Misra was also minister in Raj Nath Singh's cabinet for the department of Food & Civil Supplies and Labour. He was later made regional president of BJP unit Kanpur zone.
