= Ahmed Omar Mandela =

Ugandan businessman and sports administrator

Hajji Ahmed Omar Mandela
- Born: 1958 (age 67–68)
- Other name: Mandela
- Citizenship: Ugandan
- Occupations: Businessman; sports administrator
- Years active: 1980s–present
- Known for: Mandela Group of Companies; Café Javas; President of SC Villa
- Title: President of SC Villa
- Website: https://mandelagroup.co.ug/

Ahmed Omar Mandela (born in 1958) is a Ugandan businessman and sports administrator of Somali origin. He has been listed among Uganda's wealthiest businesspeople. He is the founder of the Mandela Group of Companies, a Ugandan conglomerate with interests including hospitality, petroleum, manufacturing and automotive services. He is also the founder of City Oil and Café Javas. He currently serves as president of SC Villa football club.

== Business career ==
Mandela established his business activities in Uganda during the 1980s. He is the founder of the Mandela Group of companies, which initially operated in the automotive spare-parts sector before expanding into fuel distribution and restaurants. He is founder of Café Javas restaurant which opened in 2005 on Bombo Road in Kampala, next to a City Oil fuel station and now with branches in Uganda and East Africa.

The business subsequently expanded into Kenya. Café Javas began operating in Kenya in 2018 under the name CJ's following a dispute concerning the use of the Café Javas name. The first CJ's restaurant in Kenya opened on Koinange Street in Nairobi.

== Football administration ==
Mandela has been involved with SC Villa since the 1980s. He joined the club in 1982 and initially worked as a gateman selling match-day tickets before subsequently becoming club treasurer. He served as the club's treasurer and chairman of administration. In 2004, he resigned from both positions following a dispute with supporters over admission fees for a match between SC Villa and Iganga.

In November 2021, Mandela was elected president of SC Villa unopposed. In March 2026, Mandela was declared president of SC Villa after being the only candidate to complete the nomination and vetting process.

== Personal life ==
Mandela is of Somali origin and comes from a Somali Ugandan business family.

== See also ==
- SC Villa
- Gordon Wavamunno
- Patrick Bitature
- Sudhir Ruparelia
