= S. N. Chak =

Indian police director

Shiv Nath Chak (SN Chak)

Uttar Pradesh Police
- In office 1974–2011

Rashtravadi Khatik Vikas Samiti
- In office 2012–present

Desh Shakti Party
- In office 2012–present

Personal details
- Born: 1 July 1951 (age 74) Kanpur, Uttar Pradesh, India
- Party: Desh Shakti Party
- Parents: Ram Dayal Chak (father); Ram Pyari Chak (mother)
- Relatives: Pratima Chak
- Education: B.A, 1971; M.A Economics, 1973
- Alma mater: Vikramajit Singh Sanatan Dharma College
- Occupation: Politician, social activist, retired police officer
- Known for: Director General of Police, Uttar Pradesh Police, Social Work

Shiv Nath Chak is an Indian police official. He is part of the 1974 batch of IPS officer and served as Director General in Uttar Pradesh Police. He also worked as Director General in Indian railways. SN Chak retired as Director General of Police on 30 June 2011.

== Early life ==
SN Chak came from a Khatik family of Chak clan. He used to paste stickers on bidi packets to earn money for his education.

== Career ==
Chak participated in social activities beginning in 1997. Chak published Samaj Sanjeevani magazines, journals and a directory of the Khatik community, GharDwar. He organised conventions, civil service preparatory classes, and founded Rashtravadi Khatik Vikas Parishad..(transl. Nationalist Khatik Development Council), later named Rashtravadi Khatik Vikas Samiti..(transl. Nationalist Khatik Development Committee) to provide a platform for providing youth social services.

He founded Desh Shakti Party, whose motto was to support the Constitution of India. He supported political empowerment of SC, ST, OBC and Minorities. The party contested general assembly elections in Jharkhand in 2015 and in Uttar Pradesh in 2017 and organised protests, rallies etc. on political issues. From 12 March 2019 to 26 April 2020 Chak was a member of Bhartiya Janata Party.
