= Vilayati Ram Katyal =

Indian politician

Vilayati Ram Katyal विलायती राम कत्याल

Member of Legislative Assembly, Uttar Pradesh
- In office 1980–1988
- Preceded by: Ganesh Dutt Bajpai
- Succeeded by: Bal Chandra Misra
- Constituency: Govindnagar

Personal details
- Born: 29 July 1935 Gujranwala (Now in Pakistan)
- Died: 5 April 1988 (aged 52) Kanpur (Uttar Pradesh)
- Manner of death: Assassination
- Political party: Indian National Congress
- Spouse: Vidya Rani Katyal (m. 1957-88)
- Children: Two Sons, Two Daughters
- Education: Intermediate

Vilayati Ram Katyal (29 July 1935 – 5 April 1988) was an Indian politician and former member of Uttar Pradesh Legislative Assembly. Katyal was assassinated on 5 April 1988. He was accused of involvement in the 1984 anti-Sikh riots.
