= Ruparelia Group =

Conglomerate in Uganda

- Company type: Private Conglomerate
- Industry: Investments
- Founded: 1985; 41 years ago
- Headquarters: Kampala, Uganda
- Key people: Sudhir Ruparelia (Chairman); Rajiv Ruparelia (CEO)
- Products: horticulture, insurance, schools, real estate, hotels & resorts, broadcasting
- Number of employees: 8,000+ (2016)
- Website: Homepage

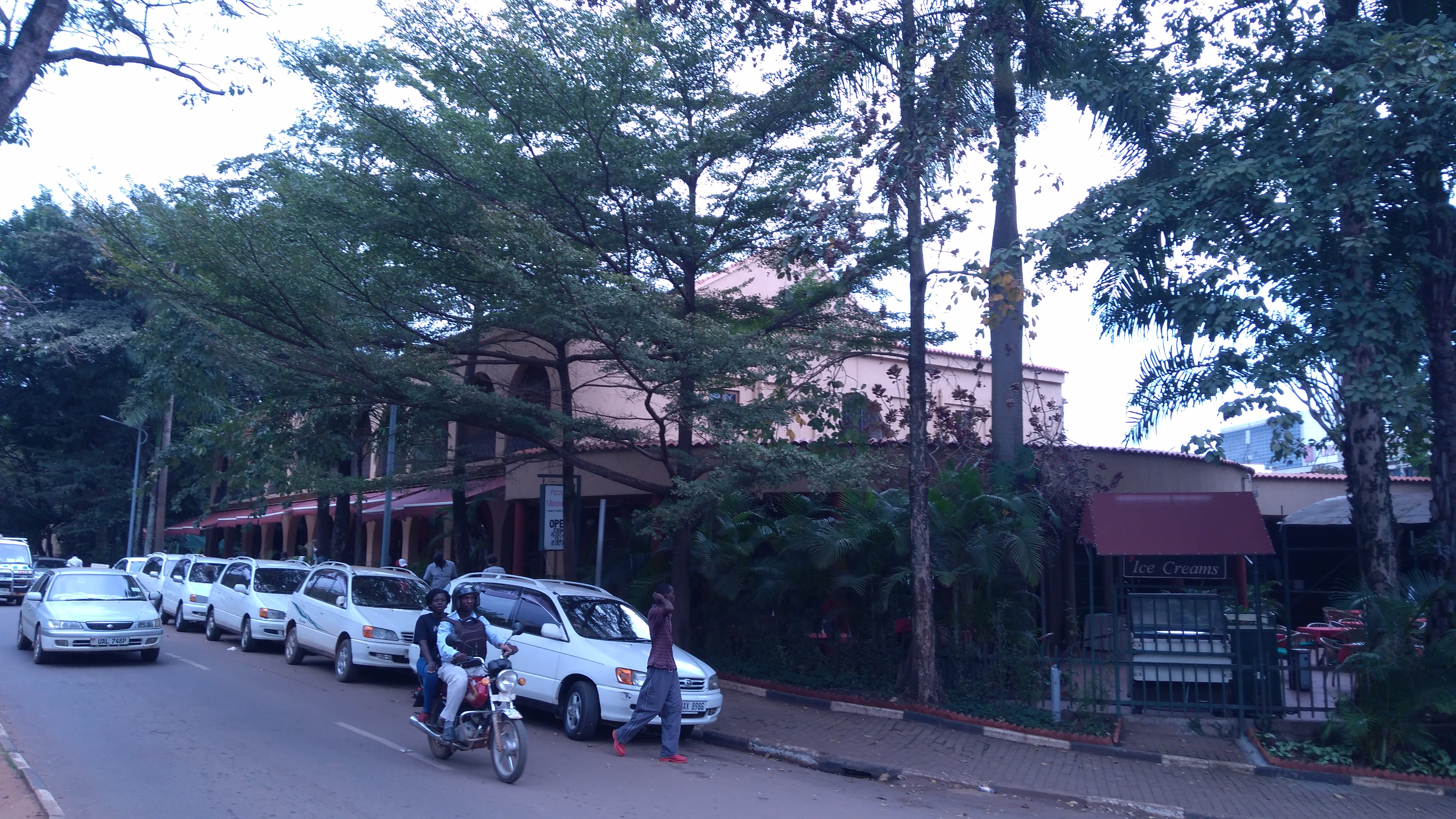
Speke Hotel Kampala

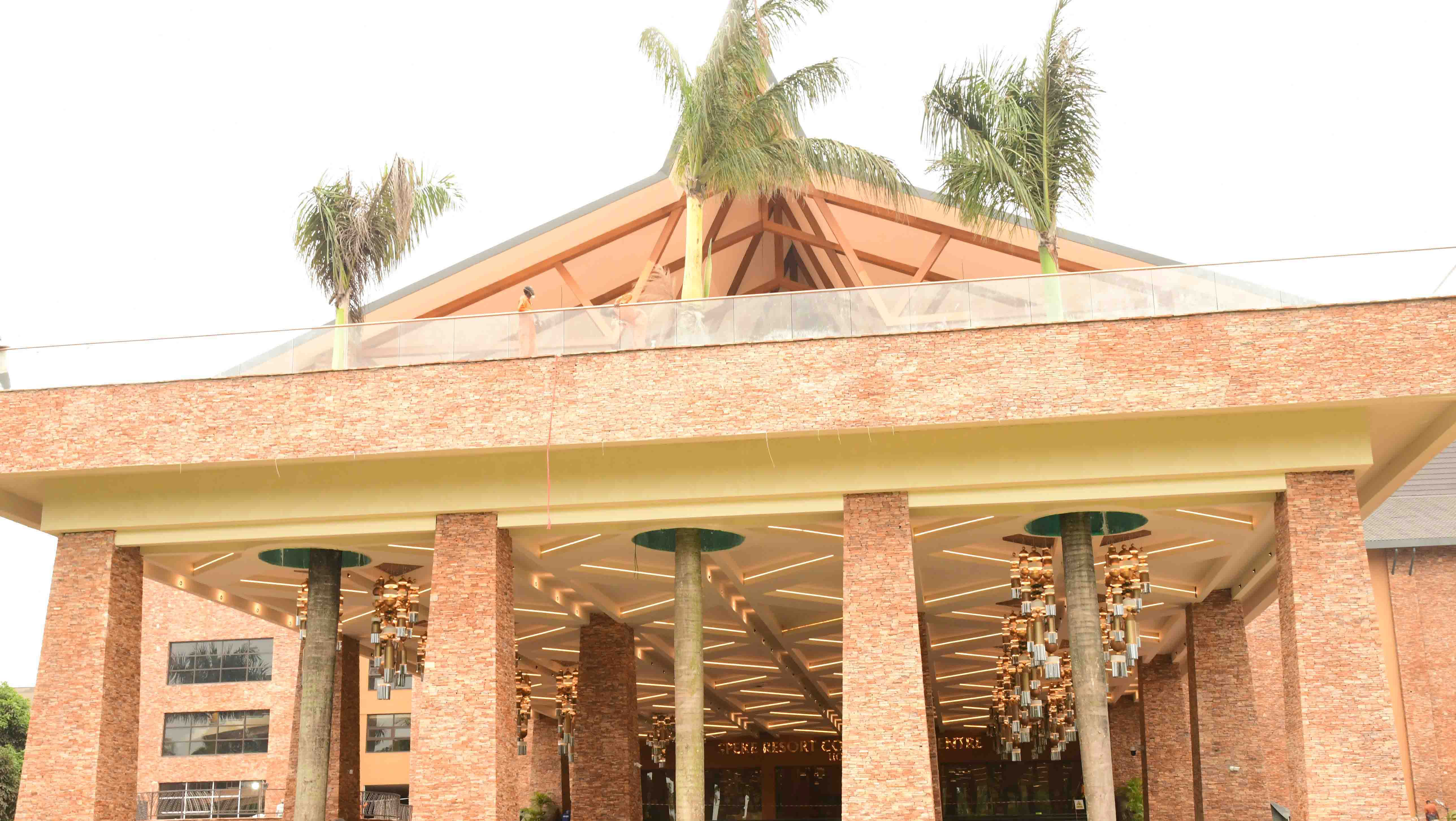
Speke Resort Convention Centre, Munyonyo

The Ruparelia Group of Companies, commonly referred to as the Ruparelia Group, is a privately owned conglomerate in Uganda. Sudhir Ruparelia, a wealthy Ugandan businessman, is a shareholder in each of the companies in the Group.

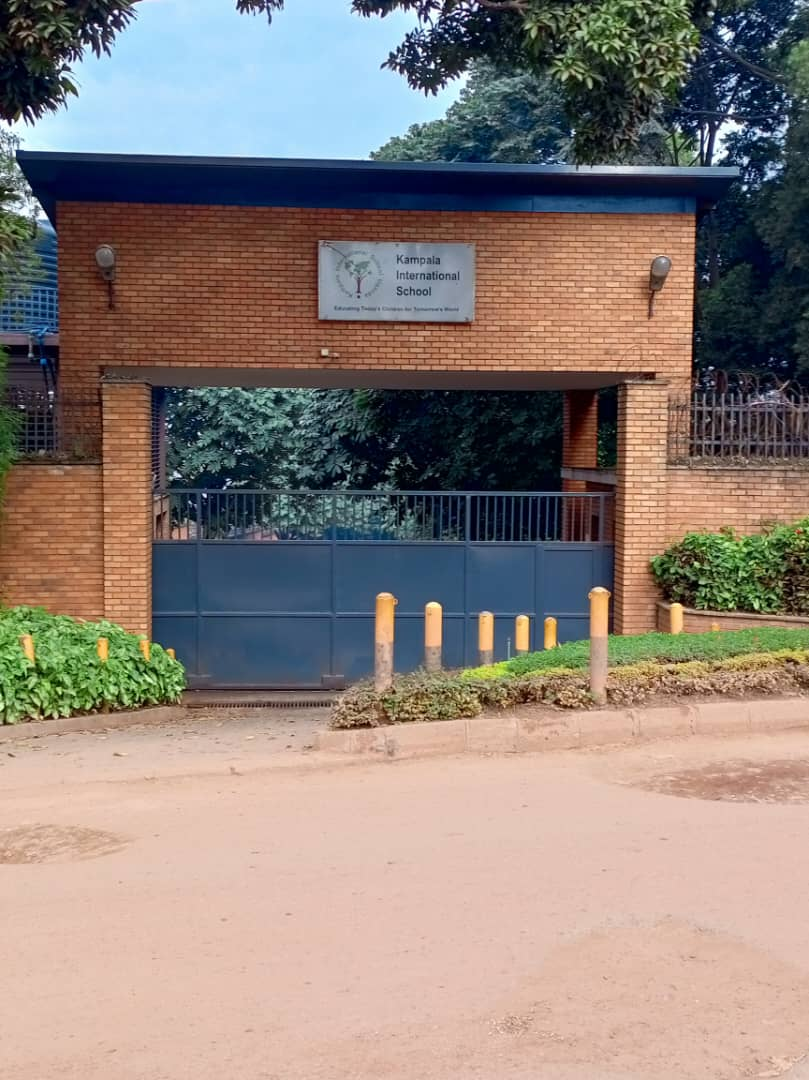
Kampala International School

As a young man in England, Sudhir Ruparelia successfully established a number of small businesses before returning to Uganda in the 1980s to take advantage of the improving political and business stability.

== Subsidiary companies ==
As of June 2024, the companies of the Ruparelia Group included but were not limited to the following:

- Premier Recruitment Limited - Kampala
- Crane Management Services Limited - Kampala
- Delhi Public International School-Naguru, Kampala
- Goldstar Insurance Company Limited - Kampala
- Kabira Country Club - Bukoto, Kampala
- Kampala International School Uganda
- Kampala Parents' School
- Kampala Speke Hotel - Kampala
- Meera Investments Limited - Kampala
- Munyonyo Commonwealth Resort - Munyonyo
- Premier Roses Limited - Entebbe
- Rosebud Limited - Entebbe
- Sanyu FM 88.2 - Kampala
- Speke Apartments Limited - Kampala
- Speke Resort and Conference Center - Munyonyo, Kampala
- Kampala Tourist Hotel - Kampala
- Victoria University Uganda - Kampala
- Vcon Construction Uganda Limited
- Premier Sand Limited
- The group owns commercial and real estate interests in Rwanda, South Sudan, the United Kingdom, and the United Arab Emirates.
- Pearl Business Park: In July 2021, the Group announced plans to establish an upscale business park on 18 acres (7 ha) that the group owns in the city of Kampala. The park will include a shopping mall, a five-star hotel and a modern hospital.
- Arie Towers - Kampala; a 14-story office high-rise, in the upscale Nakasero neighborhood of Kampala.
- Speke Resort Convention Centre - Munyonyo, Kampala. A 4,400-seater convention facility; the venue of the 19th Non-Aligned Movement (NAM) and the Group of 77 (G-77)+ China Third South summits, 15–23 January 2024. "The two meetings hosted over 5,000 delegates, including 70 heads of state and government, from 120 countries".
- Paradise Island Resort - Located on Paradise Island, on Lake Victoria, approximately 20 minutes by boat from Speke Resort Munyonyo.

== See also ==
- List of conglomerates in Uganda
- List of conglomerates in Africa
- Kampala Capital City Authority
