= Kidwai Nagar Assembly constituency =

Constituency of the Uttar Pradesh legislative assembly in India

Kidwai Nagar
- Constituency No. 215 for the Uttar Pradesh Legislative Assembly

Constituency details
- Country: India
- Region: North India
- State: Uttar Pradesh
- District: Kanpur Nagar
- Total electors: 3,51,458 (2024)
- Reservation: None

Member of Legislative Assembly
- 18th Uttar Pradesh Legislative Assembly
- Incumbent Mahesh Kumar Trivedi
- Party: Bharatiya Janta Party
- Elected year: 2022

Kidwai Nagar Assembly constituency is one of 403 legislative assemblies of the Uttar Pradesh Legislative Assembly. It comes under the Kanpur Lok Sabha constituency. Kidwai Nagar comprises wards 12, 36, 44, 45, 48, 65, 67, 71, 73, 82, 83, 86, 87, 90, 96, 107, and 109 in the Kanpur Municipal Corporation of Kanpur Sadar Tehsil. Kidwai Nagar is the largest assembly constituency in India.

== Members of the Legislative Assembly ==
Year	Member	Party
Till 2012 : Constituency did not exist
2012	Ajay Kapoor	Indian National Congress
2017	Mahesh Trivedi	Bharatiya Janata Party
2022	Mahesh Trivedi	Bharatiya Janata Party

== Election results ==
=== 2027 ===
2027 Uttar Pradesh Legislative Assembly election: Kidwai Nagar
Party	Candidate	Votes	%	±%
INDIA				
NDA				
BSP				
NOTA	None of the above			
Majority				
Turnout				
gain from		Swing		

2022 Uttar Pradesh Legislative Assembly election: Kidwai Nagar
Party	Candidate	Votes	%	±%
BJP	Mahesh Trivedi	114,111	55.39	+1.08
INC	Ajay Kapoor	76,351	37.06	−0.68
SP	Abhimanyu Gupta	8,397	4.08	N/A
BSP	Mohan Mishra	3,846	1.87	−4.60
AAP	Vivek Dwivedi	1,129	0.55	N/A
JSP	Rakesh Kumar Dixit	178	0.09	N/A
SJNP	Alok Kumar	151	0.07	N/A
SS	Pawan Kumar Tiwari	114	0.06	N/A
NOTA	None of the Above	1,067	0.52	−0.02
Majority		37,760	18.33	+1.76
Turnout		2,06,018	59.06	+1.23
BJP hold		Swing	+1.08	

U. P. Legislative Assembly Election, 2017: Kidwai Nagar
Party	Candidate	Votes	%	±%
BJP	Mahesh Trivedi	1,11,407	54.31	+19.63
INC	Ajay Kapoor	77,424	37.74	+1.92
BSP	Sandeep Kumar Sharma	13,273	6.47	−6.21
BSCP	Ram Karan Singh	610	0.30	
Independent	Sushil Kumar Verma	424	0.21	
BMP	Vinod Kumar	326	0.16	
DSP	Pratima Chak	243	0.12	
Independent	Sitaram Shukla	171	0.08	
VPI	Surjeet Singh	139	0.07	
NOTA	None of the Above	1,117	0.54	
Majority		33,983	16.57	+15.43
Turnout		2,05,134	57.83	+3.45
BJP gain from INC		Swing	+18.49	

U. P. Legislative Assembly Election, 2012: Kidwai Nagar
Party	Candidate	Votes	%	±%
INC	Ajay Kapoor	63,400	35.82	
BJP	Viveksheel Shukla (Beenu)	61,373	34.68	
SP	Om Prakash Mishra	22,544	12.74	
BSP	Pt. Shyam Sunder Garg Shukla	22,438	12.68	
JRP	Oomendra Bharat	1,646	0.93	
CPI	Anil Awasthi Ram Ji	1,096	0.62	
RJP(K)	Sitaram Shukla	575	0.32	
AD(K)	Heera Lal Rathauria	533	0.30	
BPD	Ashok Mishra Bhutani	327	0.18	
Independent	Prabhat Gupta	322	0.18	
Independent	Neeraj Dutt Dixit	321	0.18	
Independent	Pappu Bhai Baba Ji	317	0.18	
JD(U)	Ravi Shanker Tiwari	294	0.17	
Independent	Nand Kishore	265	0.15	
AIFB	Mohan Lal Gupta	248	0.14	
RUC	Jakeema Begum	238	0.13	
RLM	Raj Kumar Dixit	237	0.13	
LJP	Pt. Raj Kumar Sharma	213	0.12	
RVLP	Shabana Parveen	167	0.09	
LKD	Kusum Singh	153	0.09	
ABRS	Raghuraj Shastri	148	0.08	
Independent	Upendra Kumar Tiwari	118	0.07	
Majority		2,027	1.14	
Turnout		1,76,973	54.38	
INC win (new seat)				

Uttar Pradesh Assembly Election, 2022 Kanpur Lok Sabha Constituency Summary
Party	Seats won	Seat change
Samajwadi Party	3	▲1
Bharatiya Janata Party	2	0
Indian National Congress	0	▼1
Bahujan Samaj Party	0	0

=== 2022 ===
2022 Uttar Pradesh Legislative Assembly Election: Kidwai Nagar
Party	Candidate	Votes	%	±%
BJP	Mahesh Trivedi	114,111	55.39	▲1.08
INC	Ajay Kapoor	76,351	37.06	▼0.68
SP	Abhimanyu Gupta	8,397	4.08	
BSP	Mohan Mishra	3,846	1.87	▼4.6
NOTA	None of the above	1,067	0.52	▼0.03
Majority		37,760	18.33	▲1.76
Turnout		206,018	59.06	▲1.23
BJP hold		Swing		

=== 2017 ===
2017 Uttar Pradesh Legislative Assembly Election: Kidwai Nagar
Party	Candidate	Votes	%	±%
BJP	Mahesh Chandra	111,407	54.31	
INC	Ajay Kapoor	77,424	37.74	
BSP	Sandeep Kumar	13,273	6.47	
NOTA	None of the above	1,117	0.55	
Majority		33,983	16.57	
Turnout		205,134	57.83	

== See also ==
- List of Vidhan Sabha constituencies of Uttar Pradesh
