= Govind Nagar =

- Suburb
- Nickname: Southern Suburb of Kanpur
- Country: India
- State: Uttar Pradesh
- District: Kanpur

Government
  - Body: Govind Nagar Police Station

Languages
  - Official: Hindi
- Time zone: UTC+5:30 (IST)
- PIN: 208 006
- Vehicle registration: UP-78
- Nearest city: Kanpur
- Literacy: -%
- Lok Sabha constituency: Kanpur Urban
- Vidhan Sabha constituency: Govind Nagar
- Civic agency: Govind Nagar Police Station

Govind Nagar is a southern neighbourhood of Kanpur named after Govind Vallabh Pant as he inaugurated this locality.

It is surrounded by Fazalganj and Pratapganj in the north, Dada Nagar in the west, Bakarganj and Kidwai Nagar in the east, barra, Juhi and Tulsi Vihar in the south. It is large area comprising Halkawanda Colony, Param Purwa, Saket Nagar.

Govindpuri Railway Station is located in Govind Nagar and Jhakarkatti Bus station 4 km east.
