= Nainital Bank =

Public Bank in India

The Nainital Bank Ltd
- Type: Scheduled commercial bank
- Industry: Banking; Financial services Investment services
- Founded: 1922
- Headquarters: Nainital, Uttarakhand, India
- Key people: 1. Sushil Kumar Lal; (MD & CEO) 2.Kuldeep Singh (Executive Director): 3. Dr. Deepak Pant; (Chief Operating Officer): 4. Mahesh Kumar Goyal; (Chief Financial Officer)
- Products: Finance and insurance Consumer banking Corporate banking Investment banking Investment management Private banking
- Revenue: ▲₹751.85 crore (US$78 million) (2025)
- Operating income: ▲₹89.02 crore (US$9.2 million) (2025)
- Net income: ▲₹50.61 crore (US$5.3 million) (2025)
- Total assets: ▲₹9,360.48 crore (US$970 million) (2025)
- Number of employees: 1188
- Parent: Bank of Baroda, Ministry of Finance, Government of India
- Website: www.nainitalbank.bank.in

The Nainital Bank Limited (NTB) (known as Nainital Bank) is a scheduled commercial bank founded in 1922. The bank is a subsidiary of Bank of Baroda which is under the ownership of Ministry of Finance of the Government of India. The bank has expanded to Uttar Pradesh, Uttarakhand, Rajasthan, Delhi and Haryana and has 173 branches.

== Overview ==
Nainital Bank was founded by Govind Ballabh Pant. In 1922, the government-owned Bank of Baroda (BOB), the second largest bank in India, acquired a 98.6% (around 99%) stake in the bank and made it a subsidiary.

The bank had a net worth of around Rs 8.37 billion as of 31 March 2025. It bank launched its rights issue in September 2009, to expand its capital adequacy ratio (CAR) to 14 per cent, this came after it previously withdrew its plans for an IPO due to adverse market conditions in 2007; by April 2010, the right issue had raised ₹300 million (US$3.1 million).

Nainital bank is associated with Bank of Baroda, Currently, NBL has 173 branches in Uttarakhand, Uttar Pradesh, Delhi, Haryana and Rajasthan. It also provide online facilities, apart from Personal Banking, Business Banking, Rural and Agricultural Banking. The Nainital Bank Limited is registered as scheduled commercial bank with Reserve Bank of India (RBI), the central bank of India.

In December 2024, Nainital Bank upgraded its RTGS, NEFT, and net-banking systems to comply with RBI and IFTAS guidelines, aiming to provide customers with faster, more secure, and seamless online fund transfer services using advanced encryption technologies.

== Branch Locations ==
The Nainital Bank Limited has 173 branches presently in the following Indian states.

- Uttarakhand
- Uttar Pradesh
- Delhi
- Rajasthan
- Haryana

== See also ==
- Banking in India
- List of banks in India
- Reserve Bank of India
- Indian Financial System Code
- List of largest banks
- List of companies of India
- Make in India
