= Ajay Kapoor (politician) =

Indian politician

Member of Legislative Assembly, Uttar Pradesh
- In office 24 February 2002 – 5 March 2012
- Preceded by: Bal Chandra Misra
- Succeeded by: Satyadev Pachauri
- Constituency: Govind Nagar
- In office 5 March 2012 – 11 March 2017
- Succeeded by: Mahesh Trivedi
- Constituency: Kidwai Nagar

Personal details
- Born: 21 February 1967 (age 58); Kanpur, Uttar Pradesh, India
- Spouse: Meenakshi Kapoor
- Children: 1
- Education: Graduate

Ajay Kapoor (born 21 February 1967) is an Indian politician from Kanpur. He won the Assembly elections for the first time in 2002 from Govind Nagar with a margin of 53,000 votes as the INC candidate, he again won the elections in 2007 from Govind Nagar afterwards. In the 2012 Assembly Election, he won for a third time Assembly Elections but this time from Kidwai Nagar as the INC candidate which is a part of earlier Govind Nagar constituency. Just before 2024 Loksabha elections, he shifted his political route from INC to BJP by joining BJP on 13 March, 2024. The reason for this change is said to be Ajay Kapoor's strong belief in CAA, and the Bill's recent notification by Central Government.

On 7 January 2017, the Uttar Pradesh election commission filed a show cause notice against Kapoor for violating election conduct rules ahead of the upcoming Assembly elections. Kapoor had laid the foundation stone with his name for the St. Thomas School road three days earlier, which is against conduct rules.

He lost his seat in the 2017 Uttar Pradesh Assembly election to Mahesh Trivedi of the Bharatiya Janata Party.
