= Speke Resort and Conference Center =

Building in Uganda

Speke Resort and Conference Centre
- Location within Uganda

General information
- Location: Munyonyo, Kampala, Uganda
- Coordinates: 00°14′15″N 32°37′30″E
- Opening: 2007
- Owner: Sudhir Ruparelia
- Management: Ruparelia Group

Other information
- Number of rooms: 335
- Number of suites: 104
- Number of restaurants: 5

Website
- Homepage

The Speke Resort and Conference Centre is a hotel-resort-conference-centre in Kampala, the capital and largest city of Uganda, the third-largest economy in the East African Community. It is one of the five 4-star hotels in Kampala, as rated by the Uganda Tourism Board in June 2015.

== Location ==
The hotel is in the neighbourhood of Munyonyo, in Makindye Division, in the southeastern part of Kampala, Uganda's capital and largest city, along the northern shores of Lake Victoria. The resort lies adjacent to the Munyonyo Commonwealth Resort. This location is approximately 13 kilometres (8 mi), by road, southeast of Kampala's central business district. The coordinates of the hotel are 0°14'15.0"N, 32°37'30.0"E (Latitude:0.2375; Longitude:32.6250).

== Overview ==
The resort was commissioned in 2007 in time to host the Commonwealth Heads of Government Meeting 2007. In 2012, the resort was valued at about US$150 million.

== Amenities ==
Amenities on-site include an Olympic-size infinity swimming pool, a choice of luxury apartments, cottages, at least five restaurants, bars, an equestrian center, and a gymnasium. Accommodation consists of 335 rooms, including 55 executive suites and 59 presidential suites. Conference facilities can accommodate up to 500 guests. The marina has chauffeured and self-drive watercraft available for hire. Private yachts and boats are also accommodated. Helicopter rides for hire are also on offer. In February 2018, the hotel added 45 new suites to bring the total number of suites at the resort to 104.

== Ownership ==
The hotel is a member of the Ruparelia Group.

== See also ==
- Kampala Capital City Authority
- Sudhir Ruparelia
