= Kidwai Nagar =

Kidwai Nagar किदवई नगर
- Kanpur (Cawnpore)
- Country: India
- State: Uttar Pradesh
- City: Kanpur
- Metro Station: Kidwai Nagar
- Parliamentary constituency: Kanpur
- Assembly constituency: Kidwai Nagar
- Elevation: 125 ft (38 m)
- Time zone: UTC+5:30 (IST)
- PIN: 208011
- Area code: +91 512

Kidwai Nagar is a neighbourhood located south in the city of Kanpur, India. It is home to the largest number of Vidhan Sabha members in Uttar Pradesh. Many businesspersons have their residence here. Kidwai Nagar is 3 km from the nearest railway station and 2 km from the Jhakarkatti interstate.
