= Govindpuri railway station =

Railway station in Uttar Pradesh, India

Govindpuri Junction Kanpur South

General information
- Location: Govind Nagar, Kanpur, India
- Coordinates: 26.4538°N 80.3136°E
- System: Indian Railways station
- Owner: Indian Railways
- Lines: New Delhi-Kanpur-Howrah mainline, Kanpur-Jhansi line, Kanpur-Banda line
- Platforms: 3 (10 under construction)
- Tracks: 22

Construction
- Structure type: Standard on ground
- Parking: Available
- Cycle facilities: Available

Other information
- Status: Active
- Station code: GOY
- Zone(s): North Central Railway zone
- Division(s): Prayagraj
- Fare zone: North Central Railway

History
- Opened: 1921; 105 years ago
- Rebuilt: 2016; 10 years ago
- Former names: Indian Branch Railway Company; Northern Railway

Passengers
- 650000

Services
ATM
Location
- Location within India Location within Uttar Pradesh

Govindpuri Junction or Kanpur South is a railway station in Kanpur which caters 650,000 passengers to their destinations. It is the third busiest railway station in Kanpur after Kanpur Central & Kanpur Anwarganj. On International Women's Day, 2018 Govindpuri became the first railway station in North Central Railway with all-women staff.

Strictly speaking by definition, it is the junction where Jhansi/Banda line is separated from Delhi–Howrah Line; however, it is not granted junction status yet due to which it has two station codes, GOV and GOY. There are ten platforms under construction to reduce load from Kanpur Central so that 256 more trains that can't be handled by other stations due to the lack of tracks and platforms will given to kanpur central as it is being rebuilt to cater 1200 trains per day and currently it is catering 611 trains.

== Location ==
It is located near Govind Nagar locality in Kanpur South. A pair of rail overbridge is also there (bearing the same name), which remains congested throughout the day.

== History ==
Due to proximity to Juhi yard, the station was called Juhi till the 1970s. Then as urban agglomeration in South Kanpur increased, the station was renamed Govindpuri due to proximity to Govind Nagar, a locality named and inaugurated by Govind Vallabh Pant.

== Trains ==
- Chitrakoot Exp
- Kashi Mahakal Exp
- Pratham Swatantrata Sangram Exp
- Tripur Sundari Exp
- Jallian Wala Bagh Exp
- Purushottam Exp
- West Bengal Sapark Kranti SF Exp
- Poorvottar Sampark Kranti SF Exp
- Bhrigu SF Exp
- Amrit Bharat Exp
- Garib Rath Exp
- Jammu Mail
- All passing passengers

=== Trains with no stops ===
- Shatabdi Exp
- Rajdhani Exp
- Duronto Exp

== Future development ==
However, in next two years, things will change it will become the first halt station in India which will directly turn into Terminal station. Kanpur South The new terminal will help decongest Kanpur Central which has gotten saturated as it caters to over 600 trains. It is modelled same as Anand Vihar Terminal in Delhi.

The station is ongoing construction of a new waiting room, a new ticketing room, new platforms and overbridge. The Reservation Room has been constructed and now in use and the older one will be dismantled. The new Platform No. 1 is also under construction which be longer and slightly before than earlier one leaving an extra loop line between Platform no. 1 and Platform no. 2. The older Platform No. 1 will be dismantled.

The width of Platform No. 2 and Platform No. 3 is also been increased.

Recently some train's halts have been shifted here from Kanpur Central & are plans to run some express and passengers trains from Govindpuri.

Trains towards Jhansi, Mahoba, Banda, Chitrakoot, Etawah and Tundla will be managed by Kanpur South.

== See also ==
- Kanpur Central
- Kanpur Anwarganj
- Lucknow–Kanpur Suburban Railway
