= Surendra Maithani =

Indian politician

Surendra Maithani is an Indian politician and is a member of Uttar Pradesh Legislative Assembly from Govind Nagar assembly constituency of Kanpur Nagar district.
