= Bank of Baroda (Kenya) =

Kenyan commercial bank

Bank of Baroda (Kenya) Limited
- Type: Private subsidiary
- Industry: Financial services
- Founded: 1 July 1953; 73 years ago
- Headquarters: Baroda House, 90 Muthithi Road, Westlands, Nairobi, Kenya
- Area served: Kenya
- Products: Retail banking, corporate banking, SME banking
- Parent: Bank of Baroda
- Website: www.bankofbarodakenya.co.ke

Bank of Baroda (Kenya) Limited is a commercial bank operating in Kenya and a subsidiary of Bank of Baroda, an Indian public-sector banking institution. The bank is licensed and regulated by the Central Bank of Kenya and provides retail, corporate and trade finance services.

== Overview ==
Bank of Baroda (Kenya) Limited provides banking services to retail customers, SMEs, corporate and institutional customers. Its products and services include deposit accounts, personal and business loans, corporate banking and trade finance.

The bank forms part of the international operations of Bank of Baroda, an Indian multinational banking and financial-services institution headquartered in Vadodara, Gujarat, India. Its Kenyan operations serve domestic customers and businesses engaged in regional and international trade.

As of 31 December 2025, the bank reported total assets of KSh 204.3 billion, shareholders' equity of KSh 39.5 billion and net profit of KSh 4.5 billion.

== History ==
Bank of Baroda entered the Kenyan market in 1953, when it established a branch in Mombasa. The bank was licensed to conduct banking business in Kenya on 1 July 1953.

Its establishment in Mombasa reflected the city's importance as a centre for maritime commerce and international trade. The bank initially supported businesses and customers involved in trade between East Africa and the Indian subcontinent. Its entry into Kenya gave Bank of Baroda one of the oldest foreign-bank footprints in the East African banking market.

Following Kenya's independence in 1963, the bank expanded its services and branch network in response to the country's growing commercial and industrial sectors. In January 1992, Bank of Baroda (Kenya) Ltd was incorporated as a locally regulated subsidiary of Bank of Baroda, combining its Kenyan banking operations with access to its parent company's international network.

== Shareholding ==
Bank of Baroda (Kenya) Limited is a subsidiary of Bank of Baroda of India. The publicly reported ownership structure is presented below:

Bank of Baroda (Kenya) Ltd

Rank	Name of owner	Percentage ownership
1	Bank of Baroda	86.70
2	Local Investors	13.30
	Total	100.00

== Branches ==
Bank of Baroda (Kenya) Limited operates 14 branches in several Kenyan commercial centres.

== See also ==
- List of banks in Kenya
- Central Bank of Kenya
- Economy of Kenya
- Bank of Baroda
