= Victoria University Uganda =

Private university in Uganda

- Motto: Come prepared to learn, Leave prepared to succeed
- Type: Private
- Established: 2011; 15 years ago
- Vice-Chancellor: Dr Lawrence Muganga
- Students: 1,500+ (2021)
- Location: Kampala, Uganda; 00°18′49″N 32°35′21″E
- Campus: Urban
- Website: www.vu.ac.ug/home
- Location within Kampala

Victoria University Uganda (VUU), also known as Victoria University Kampala, is a chartered University by the Uganda National Council for Higher Education (NCHE). It offers short, professional, diploma, undergraduate and postgraduate courses.

== Location ==
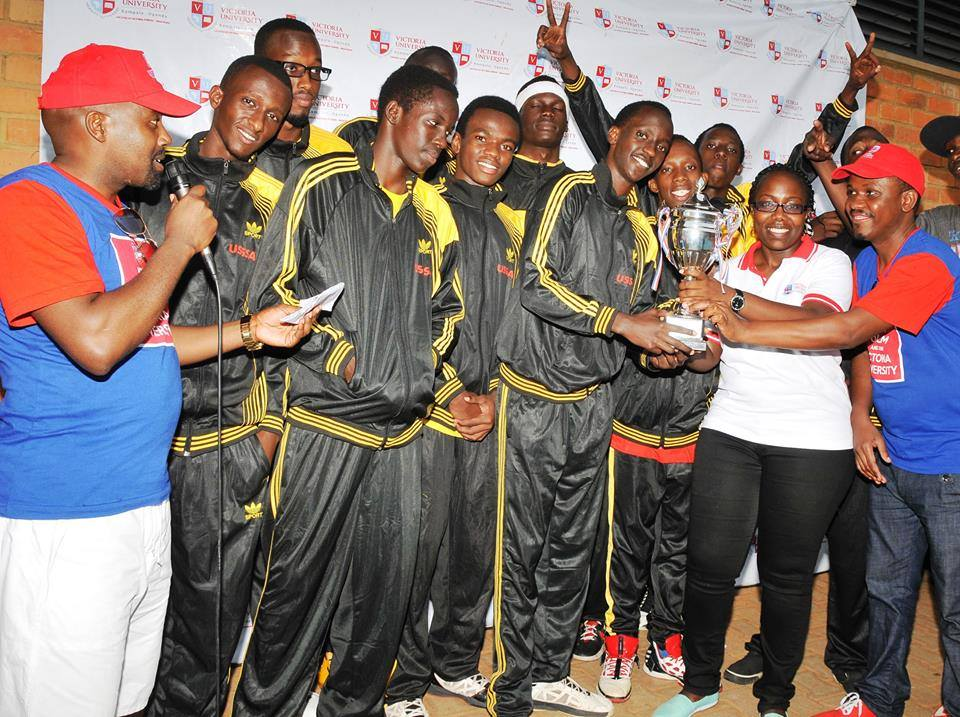
Victoria University international schools champions

VUU's main campus is located at Victoria Towers, 1-13 Jinja Road, in the central business district of Kampala, the capital and largest city of Uganda. The coordinates of VUU are 0° 18' 48.60"N, +32° 35' 21.00"S (Latitude:0.3135000; Longitude:32.589167). Plans are underway to relocate the main campus of VUU to a more spacious location in the future.

== History ==
VUU was established in 2011 by Edulink Holdings Limited, a private company that invests internationally in tertiary institutions of higher education. From 2011 until late 2012, VUU was affiliated with the University of Buckingham (UB) in the United Kingdom, which awarded the majority of degrees offered at VUU. VUU, however, has developed a number of courses that it teaches and examines independently of UB. The degree certificates of the VUU courses are awarded by VUU. VUU was accredited by the Uganda National Council for Higher Education in October 2010. In 2012, the affiliation with UB was terminated.

In September 2013, VUU was purchased for an undisclosed sum by Sudhir Ruparelia, ranked the wealthiest individual in East Africa, by Forbes magazine in 2012. VUU then became a member of the Ruparelia Group. Its campus relocated to Eagen Mansions, at 1-13 Jinja Road, in Kampala's central business district, which was renamed "Victoria Towers".

== University leadership ==
List of vice chancellors
Tenure	Position	Vice chancellor
2020-current	Vice chancellor	Dr. Lawrence Muganga
2017-2020	Vice chancellor	Dr. Krishna N. Sharma
2016-2017	Acting vice chancellor	Joseph Nyakana
2013-2016	Vice chancellor	Dr. Stephen Robert Isabalija

== Academics ==
As of July 2024, VUU consisted of six faculties:

- Faculty of Law
- Faculty of Business and Management
- Faculty of Science and Technology
- Faculty of Humanities and Social Sciences
- Faculty of Health Sciences
- Faculty of Petroleum and Energy Studies

=== Undergraduate programmes ===
As of December 2018, Victoria University offered the following undergraduate courses:

=== Faculy of Law ===
- Bachelor of Laws - 3 years

==== Faculty of Business and Management ====
- Bachelor of Business Administration - 3 years
- Bachelor of Banking and Finance - 3 years
- Bachelor of Tourism and Hospitality Management - 3 years
- Bachelor of International Business - 3 years
- Bachelor of Science in Oil and Gas Accounting - 3 years
- Bachelor of Events and Hospitality Management - 3 years
- Diploma in Procurement and Logistics - 2 years
- Diploma in Banking and Finance - 2 years
- Diploma in Business Administration - 2 years
- Diploma in Tourism and Hospitality - 2 years
- Diploma in Events and Hospitality Management - 2 years

==== Faculty of Science and Technology ====
- Bachelor of Computer Science - 3 years
- Bachelor of Business in Information Systems - 3 years
- Bachelor of Information Technology - 3 years
- Diploma in Business Information Systems - 2 years
- Diploma in Information Technology - 2 years

==== Faculty of Humanities and Social Sciences ====
- Bachelor of Public Administration and Management - 3 years
- Bachelor of Social Work and Social Administration - 3 years
- Bachelor of Journalism and Media Studies - 3 years
- Bachelor of Human Resource Management - 3 years
- Bachelor of International Relations and Diplomatic Studies - 3 years
- Foundation Programme
- Higher Education Certificate in Biological Science

==== Faculty of Health of Sciences ====
- Bachelor of Science in Public Health - full time: 4 years
- Bachelor of Environmental Health - 3 years
- Bachelor of Nursing Science - 4 years
- Bachelor of Midwifery Science - 3 years
- Bachelor of Science in Human Nutrition and Dietetics - 4 years.
- Bachelor of Pharmacy - 4 years

=== Postgraduate programmes ===
- Master of Business Administration (MBA)
- Master of Arts in Public Administration and Management (MA- PAM)
- Master of Science in Public Health

== Developments ==
The university held its first graduation ceremony at Kabira Country Club, during the summer of 2014. Twenty-two graduates were awarded degrees and diplomas.

In December 2021, the Uganda National Council of Higher Education (UNCHE) granted Victoria University Uganda with a university charter, provided that certain precedents are met. These precedents were met in July 2022 when the university received its charter certificate, duly signed by the president of Uganda.

In October 2025, the university established 100 postgraduate scholarships available to high performing undergraduates willing to pursue postgraduate studies at the university. The scholarships were established in memory of the late Rajiv Ruparelia (1990 - 2025), the only son of Jyotsna Ruparelia and Sudhir Ruparelia, who died in a one car accident in May 2025 at the age of 35 years. At the time of his death, Rajiv Ruparelia was the chief executive officer of the Ruparelia Group of Companies.

In October 2026, the university unveiled architectural plans for a purpose-built main campus in Naguru, a Kampala suburb, to accommodate expanding student enrollment

== See also ==
- Category:Academic staff of Victoria University Uganda
- Category:Victoria University Uganda alumni
- List of universities in Uganda
- Ugandan university leaders
- Education in Uganda
