= Bank of Baroda =

Indian public sector bank

Bank of Baroda Ltd.
- Type: Public
- Traded as: BSE: 532134; NSE: BANKBARODA
- ISIN: INE028A01039
- Industry: Banking; Financial services
- Founded: 20 July 1908; 118 years ago
- Founder: Sayajirao Gaekwad III
- Headquarters: Vadodara, Gujarat, India
- Number of locations: 8,400+ Branches; 10,000+ ATMs & CRs (September 2025)
- Area served: India & Worldwide
- Key people: Debadatta Chand (MD & CEO)
- Products: Retail banking; Corporate banking; Investment banking; Mortgage loans; Private banking; Wealth management; Asset management; Investment management; Credit cards; Insurance
- Revenue: ▲₹141,250 crore (US$15 billion) (2026)
- Operating income: ▲₹32,150 crore (US$3.3 billion) (2026)
- Net income: ▲₹20,021 crore (US$2.1 billion) (2026)
- Total assets: ▲₹1,728,900 crore (US$180 billion) (2026)
- Total equity: ▲₹128,500 crore (US$13 billion) (2026)
- Number of employees: 82,100 (2026)
- Parent: Government of India (63.93%)
- Capital ratio: 14.99%
- Website: bankofbaroda.bank.in

Bank of Baroda (BOB or BoB) is an Indian public sector bank headquartered in Vadodara, Gujarat. It is the second largest public sector bank in India after State Bank of India. Based on 2025 data, it is ranked 455 on the Forbes Global 2000 list.

The Maharaja of Baroda, Sayajirao Gaekwad III, founded the bank on 20 July 1908 in the princely state of Baroda, in Gujarat. The Government of India nationalized the Bank of Baroda, along with 13 other major commercial banks of India, on 19 July 1969 and the bank was designated as a profit-making public sector undertaking (PSU).

== History ==
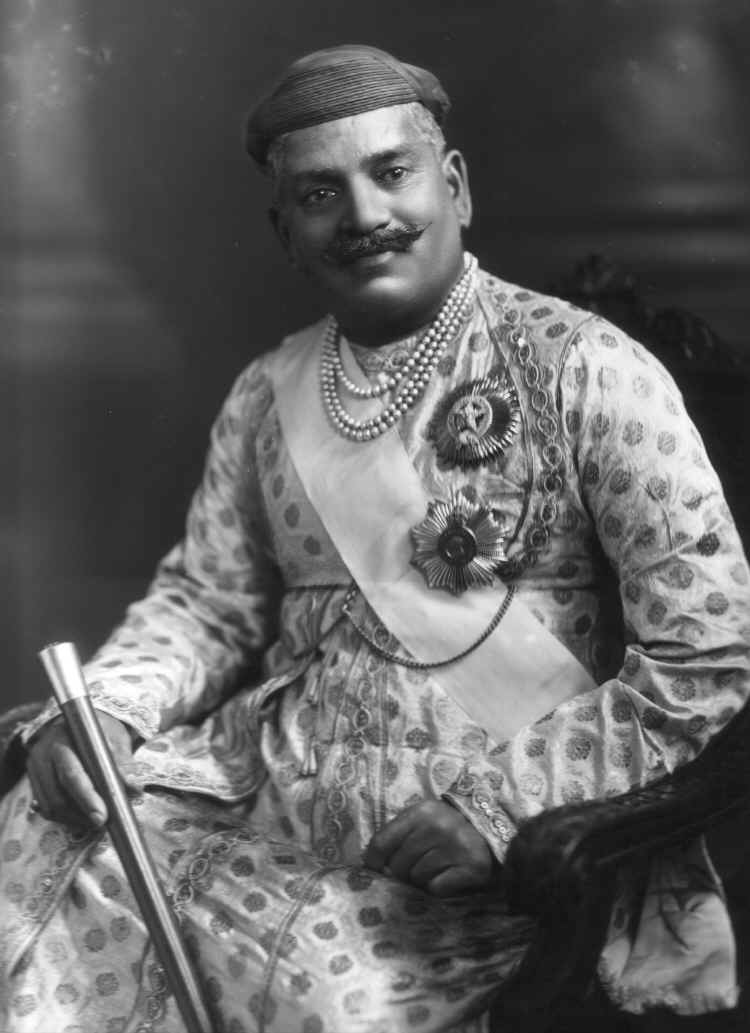
Sayajirao Gaekwad III, the founder of Bank of Baroda

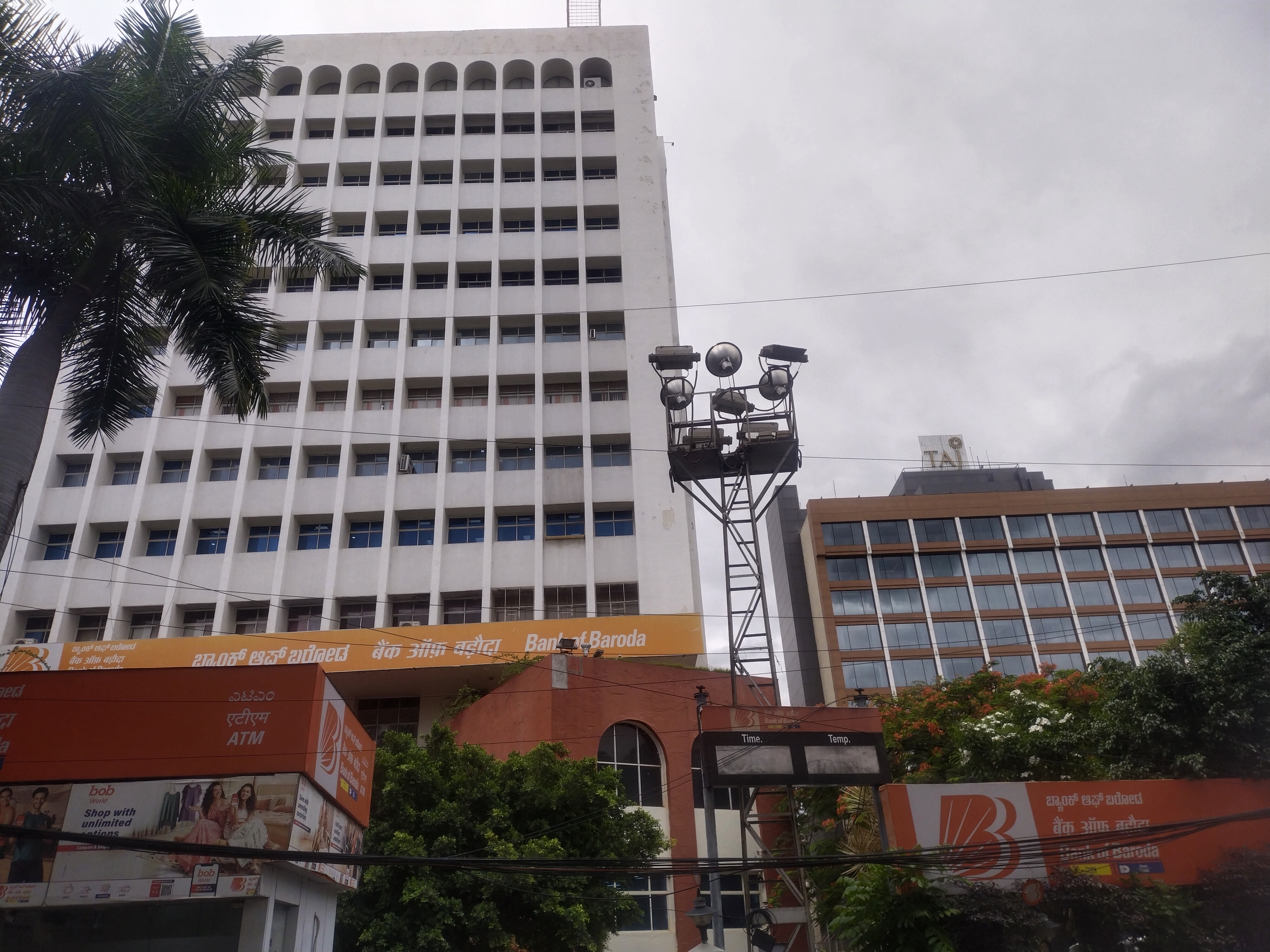
Bank of Baroda International Banking Branch at MG Road, Bengaluru formerly Vijaya Bank Head Office

In 1908, Sayajirao Gaekwad III, set up the Bank of Baroda (BoB), with other stalwarts of industry such as Sampatrao Gaekwad, Ralph Whitenack, Vithaldas Thakersey, Lallubhai Samaldas, Tulsidas Kilachand and NM Chokshi. Two years later, BoB established its first branch in Ahmedabad. The bank grew domestically until after World War II. Then in 1953, it crossed the Indian Ocean to serve the communities of Indians in Kenya and Indians in Uganda by establishing a branch each in Mombasa and Kampala. The next year, it opened a second branch in Kenya, in Nairobi, and in 1956, it opened a branch in Tanzania at Dar-es-Salaam. In 1957, BoB established a branch in London. In 1958, BoB acquired Hind Bank (Calcutta; est. 1943), which became BoB's first domestic acquisition.

=== 1960s ===
In 1961, BoB acquired New Citizen Bank of India, which expanded its branch network in Maharashtra. BoB also opened a branch in Fiji. The next year, it opened a branch in Mauritius

In 1963, BoB acquired Surat Banking Corporation in Surat, Gujarat. The next year, BoB acquired two banks: Umbergaon People's Bank in southern Gujarat and Tamil Nadu Central Bank in Tamil Nadu state.

In 1965, BoB opened a branch in Guyana. That same year, BoB lost its branch in Narayanganj (East Pakistan) due to the Indo-Pakistani War of 1965. In 1967, the Tanzanian government nationalised BoB's three branches there at (Dar es Salaam, Mwanga, and Moshi), and transferred their operations to the Tanzanian government-owned National Banking Corporation.

In 1969, the Indian government nationalised 14 top banks, including BoB. BoB incorporated its operations in Uganda as a 51% subsidiary, with the government owning the rest.

=== 1970s ===
In 1972, BoB acquired Bank of India's operations in Uganda. Two years later, BoB opened a branch each in Dubai and Abu Dhabi.

Back in India, in 1975, BoB acquired the majority shareholding and management control of Bareilly Corporation Bank (est. 1954) and Nainital Bank (est. in 1922), both in Uttar Pradesh and Uttarakhand, respectively. Since then, Nainital Bank has expanded to Uttarakhand, Uttar Pradesh, Haryana, Rajasthan, and Delhi state. BoB currently has 99% shareholding in Nainital Bank.

International expansion continued in 1976 with the opening of a branch in Oman and another in Brussels. The Brussels branch was aimed at Indian firms from Mumbai (Bombay) engaged in diamond cutting and jewellery having business in Antwerp, a major center for diamond cutting.

Two years later, BoB opened a branch in New York and another in the Seychelles. Then in 1979, BoB opened a branch in Nassau, the Bahamas.

=== 1980s ===
In 1980, BoB opened a branch in Bahrain and a representative office in Sydney, Australia. BoB, Union Bank of India, and Indian Bank established IUB International Finance, a licensed deposit taker, in Hong Kong. Each of the three banks took an equal share. Eventually (in 1999), BoB would buy out its partners.

A second consortium or joint-venture bank followed in 1985. BoB (20%), Bank of India (20%), Central Bank of India (20%) and ZIMCO (Zambian government; 40%) established Indo-Zambia Bank in Lusaka. That same year, BoB also opened an Offshore Banking Unit (OBU) in Bahrain (Gulf).

Back in India, in 1988, BoB amalgamated Traders Bank (established in 1947 in Delhi), which had a network of 34 branches in Delhi. The Reserve Bank had mandated the amalgamation.

=== 1990s ===
In 1992, BoB opened an OBU in Mauritius and closed its representative office in Sydney. The next year, BoB took over the London branches of Union Bank of India and Punjab & Sind Bank (P&S). P&S's branch had been established before 1970, and Union Bank's after 1980. The Reserve Bank of India ordered the takeover of the two following the banks' involvement in the Sethia fraud in 1987 and subsequent losses.

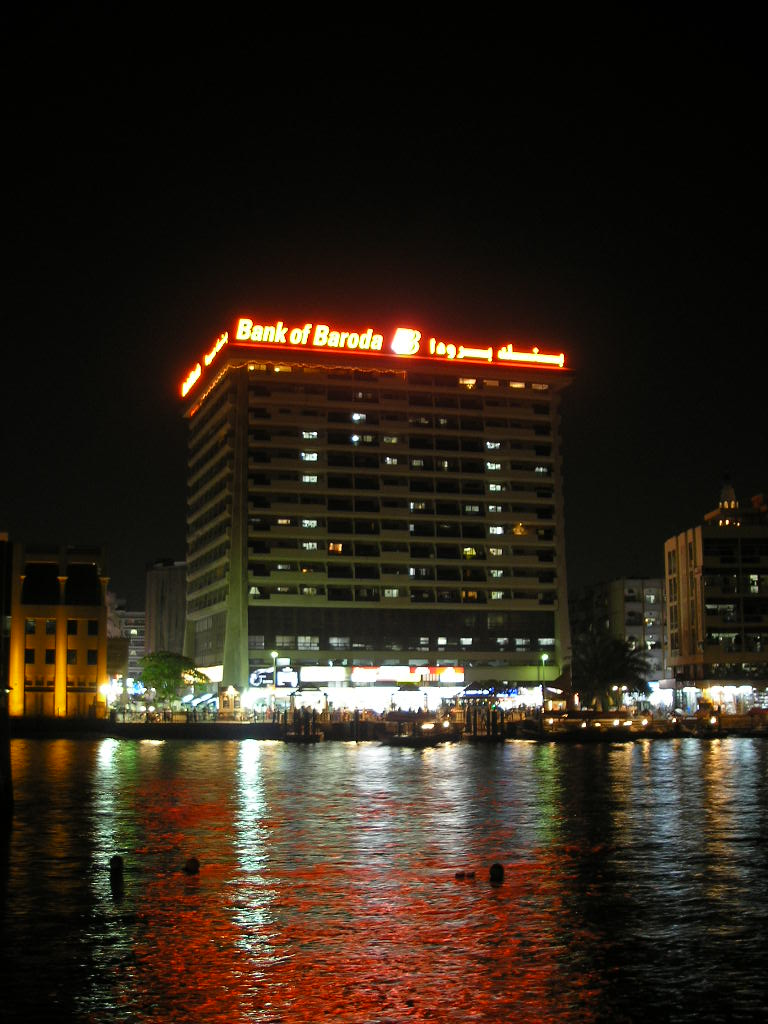
A Bank of Baroda branch at Dubai Creek.

In 1996, BoB Bank entered the capital market in December with an initial public offering (IPO). The government of India is still the largest shareholder, owning 66% of the bank's equity.

In 1997, BoB opened a branch in Durban. The next year, BoB bought out its partners in IUB International Finance in Hong Kong. Apparently, this was a response to regulatory changes following Hong Kong's reversion to the People's Republic of China. The now wholly owned subsidiary became Bank of Baroda (Hong Kong), a restricted license bank. BoB also acquired Punjab Cooperative Bank in a rescue. BoB incorporates a wholly–owned subsidiary, BOB Capital Markets, for broking business.

In 1999, BoB merged with Bareilly Corporation Bank as part of another rescue. At the time, Bareilly had 64 branches, including four in Delhi. In Guyana, BoB incorporated its branch as a subsidiary, Bank of Baroda Guyana. BoB added a branch in Mauritius and closed its Harrow Branch in London.

=== 2000s ===
In 2000, BoB established Bank of Baroda (Botswana). The bank has three banking offices, two in Gaborone and one in Francistown. In 2002, BoB converted its subsidiary in Hong Kong from a deposit-taking company to a Restricted License Bank.

In 2002, BoB acquired Benares State Bank (BSB) at the Reserve Bank of India's request. BSB had been established in 1946 but traced its origins back to 1871 and its function as the treasury office of the Benares state. In 1964, BSB acquired Bareilly Bank (est. 1934), with seven branches in the western districts of Uttar Pradesh; BSB also took over Lucknow Bank in 1968. The acquisition of BSB brought BoB 105 new branches. Lucknow Bank, a unit bank with its only office in Aminabad, was established in 1913. Also in 2002, BoB listed Bank of Baroda (Uganda) on the Uganda Securities Exchange (USE). The next year BoB opened an OBU in Mumbai.

In 2004, BoB acquired the failed South Gujarat Local Area Bank. BoB also returned to Tanzania by establishing a subsidiary in Dar-es-Salaam. BoB also opened a representative office each in Kuala Lumpur, Malaysia, and Guangdong, China.

In 2005, BoB built a Global Data Centre (DC) in Mumbai for running its centralised banking solution (CBS) and other applications in more than 1,900 branches across India and 20 other countries where the bank operates. BoB also opened a representative office in Thailand.

In 2006, BoB established an Offshore Banking Unit (OBU) in Singapore.

In 2007, its centenary year, BoB's total business crossed 2.09 trillion (short scale), its branches crossed 2000, and its global customer base 29 million people. In Hong Kong, the Bank got a Full Fledged Banking license, and the business of its Restricted License Banking subsidiary was taken over by the Bank of Baroda branch in Hong Kong w.e.f.01.04.2007.

In 2008, BoB opened a branch in Guangzhou, China (02/08/2008) and in Kenton, Harrow, United Kingdom. BoB opened a joint venture life insurance company with Andhra Bank and Legal & General (UK) called IndiaFirst Life Insurance Company.

In 2009, Bank of Baroda (New Zealand) was registered. As of 2017 BoB (NZ) has three branches: two in Auckland and one in Wellington.

=== 2010s ===
In 2010, Malaysia awarded a commercial banking licence to a locally incorporated bank to be jointly owned by Bank of Baroda, Indian Overseas Bank, and Andhra Bank.

In 2011, BoB opened an Electronic Banking Service Unit (EBSU) at Hamriya Free Zone, Sharjah (UAE). It also opened four new branches in existing operations in Uganda, Kenya (2), and Guyana. BoB closed its representative office in Malaysia in anticipation of the opening of its consortium bank there. BoB received 'In Principle' approval for the upgrading of its representative office in Australia to a branch. Bob also acquired Mumbai-based Memon Cooperative Bank, which had 225 employees and 15 branches in Maharashtra and three in Gujarat. It had to suspend operations in May 2009 due to its precarious financial condition.

The Malaysian consortium bank, India International Bank Malaysia (IIBM), finally opened in Kuala Lumpur, which has a large population of Indians. BOB owns 40%, Andhra Bank owns 25%, and IOB owns the remaining 35% of the share capital. IIBM seeks to open five branches within its first year of operations in Malaysia, and intends to grow to 15 branches within the next three years.

On 17 September 2018, the government of India proposed the merger of Dena Bank and Vijaya Bank with the Bank of Baroda, pending approval from the boards of the three banks, effectively creating the third largest lender in the country. The merger was approved by the Union Cabinet and the boards of the banks on 2 January 2019. Under the terms of the merger, Dena Bank and Vijaya Bank shareholders received 110 and 402 equity shares of the Bank of Baroda, respectively, of face value ₹2 for every 1,000 shares they held. The merger came into effect on 1 April 2019. Post-merger, the Bank of Baroda is the third largest bank in India, after State Bank of India and HDFC Bank. The consolidated entity has over 9,500 branches, 13,400 ATMs, 85,000 employees, and serves 120 million customers. The amalgamation is the first-ever three-way consolidation of banks in the country, with a combined business of Rs14.82 trillion (short scale), making it the third largest bank after State Bank of India (SBI) and ICICI Bank. Post-merger effective 1 April 2019, the bank has become the India's third largest lender behind SBI and ICICI Bank.

Bank of Baroda announced in May 2019 that it would either close or rationalise 800–900 branches to increase operational efficiency and reduce duplication post-merger. The regional and zonal offices of the merged companies would also be closed. PTI quoted an unnamed senior bank official as stating that Bank of Baroda would look to expand in eastern India as it already had a strong presence in the other regions.

== Subsidiaries ==
=== Domestic subsidiaries ===
1. BOBCARD LIMITED (it is a wholly owned subsidiary of Bank Of Baroda in the credit card industry). Net Profit for FY 2024-25 was Rs.56.74 crore.
2. BOB Capital Markets Ltd.: A wholly owned subsidiary of Bank of Baroda, it is a SEBI-registered investment banking company based in Mumbai, Maharashtra. Its financial services portfolio includes initial public offerings, private placement of debts, corporate restructuring, business valuation, mergers and acquisition, project appraisal, loan syndication, institutional equity research, and brokerage. Net profit/loss for FY 2024-25 was Rs. -8.79 Crore.
3. Nainital Bank Ltd. (98.57%): Established in the year 1922 with the objective of catering to the banking needs of Nainital, Uttarakhand. In the year 1973, the RBI directed the Bank of Baroda to manage the affairs of this bank.
4. Baroda Global Shared Services Ltd.
5. IndiaFirst Life Insurance Company Ltd.
6. Baroda BNP Paribas Asset Management India Private Ltd.
7. Baroda BNP Paribas Trustee India Private Ltd. (Formerly Baroda Trustee India Private Limited)
8. BarodaSun Technologies Ltd. (A wholly owned subsidiary of Bank of Baroda)

=== Joint ventures ===
1. India Infradebt Ltd.
2. India International Bank Malaysia Berhad

=== Regional Rural Banks ===
1. Uttar Pradesh Gramin Bank
2. Gujarat Gramin Bank

=== Overseas subsidiaries ===
1. Bank of Baroda Botswana Ltd.
2. Bank of Baroda Kenya Ltd.
3. Bank of Baroda Uganda Ltd.
4. Bank of Baroda (Guyana) Inc.
5. Bank of Baroda (New Zealand) Ltd.
6. Bank of Baroda Tanzania Ltd.
7. Bank of Baroda (UK) Ltd.

=== Overseas associate ===
1. Indo-Zambia Bank Ltd. (Lusaka)

== Shareholding ==
The shareholding structure of the bank as of 30 June 2025 is as follows:

Shareholders	Shareholding %
Government of India	63.93%
Mutual Funds	8.61%
Foreign Holding	12.27%
Indian Public	7.76%
Others	7.4%

== International presence ==
Bank of Baroda's worldwide operations.

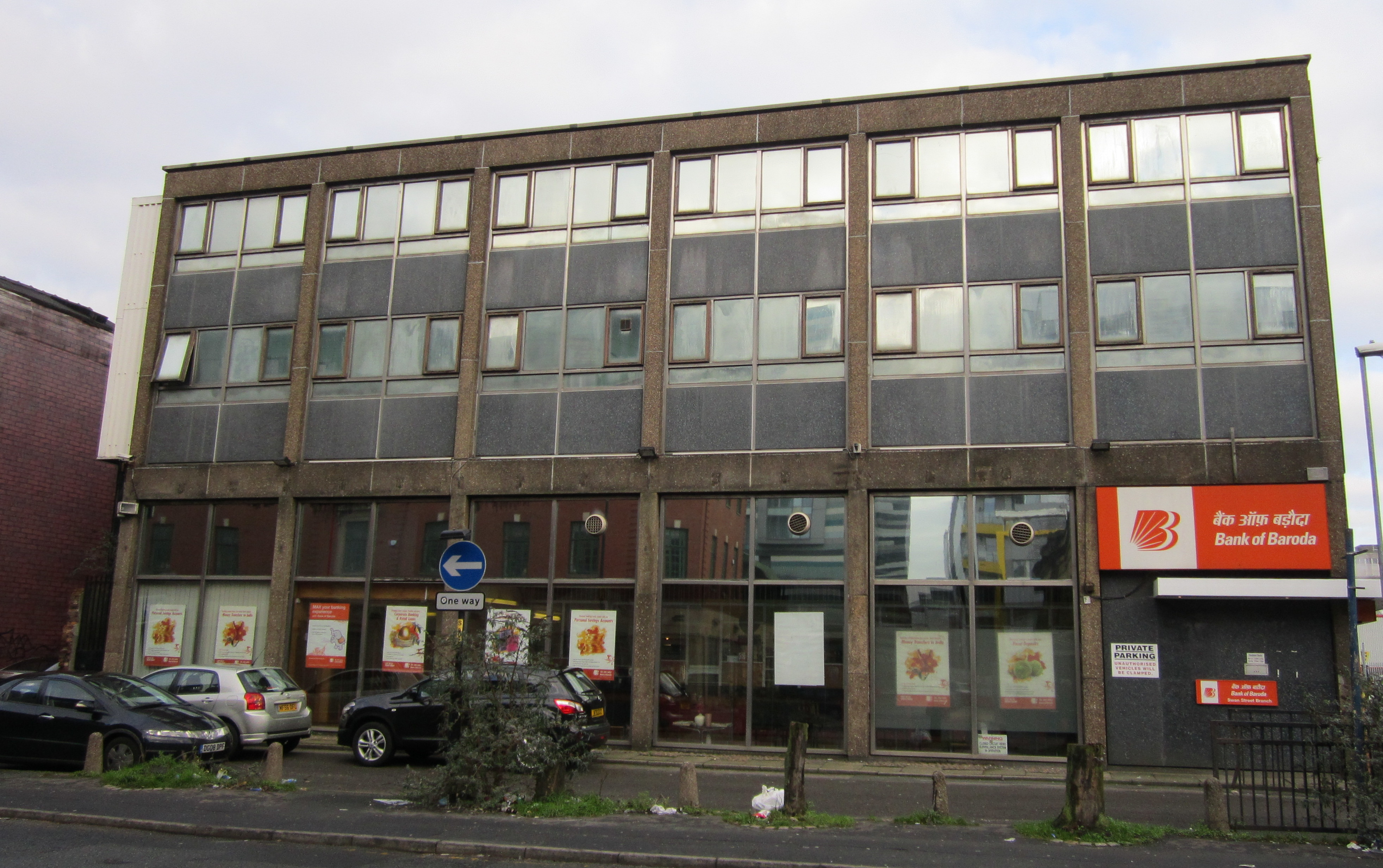
Bank of Baroda, Manchester

The bank has 107 branches/offices in 24 countries (excluding India), including 61 branches/offices of the bank, 38 branches of its 8 subsidiaries, and 1 representative office in Thailand. The Bank of Baroda has a joint venture in Zambia with 16 branches.

Among the Bank of Baroda's overseas branches are ones in the world's major financial centres (e.g., New York, London, Dubai, Hong Kong, Brussels and Singapore), as well as a number in other countries. The bank is engaged in retail banking via the branches of subsidiaries in Botswana, Guyana, Kenya, Tanzania, and Uganda. The bank has recently upgraded its representative office in Australia to a branch and set up a joint venture commercial bank in Malaysia. It has a large presence in Mauritius with about nine branches spread out in the country.

The Bank of Baroda has received permission or in-principle approval from host country regulators to open new offices in Trinidad and Tobago and Ghana, where it seeks to establish joint ventures or subsidiaries. The bank has received Reserve Bank of India approval to open offices in the Maldives, and New Zealand. It is seeking approval for operations in Bahrain, South Africa, Kuwait, Mozambique, and Qatar, and is establishing offices in Canada, New Zealand, Sri Lanka, Bahrain, Saudi Arabia, and Russia. It also has plans to extend its existing operations in the United Kingdom, the United Arab Emirates, and Botswana.

The tagline of Bank of Baroda is "India's International Bank".

== Affiliates ==
IndiaFirst Life Insurance Company is a joint venture between Bank of Baroda (44%) and fellow Indian state-owned bank Andhra Bank (30%), and UK's financial and investment company Legal & General (26%). It was incorporated in November 2009 and has its headquarters in Mumbai. The company started strongly, achieving a turnover in excess of ₹ 2 billion in its first four and half months.

== Controversies ==
In October 2023, the Reserve Bank of India directed Bank of Baroda to suspend onboarding new customers on its "bob World" mobile application due to supervisory concerns regarding unauthorized linking of mobile numbers to boost user targets. Following corrective measures and internal disciplinary actions, the RBI lifted the restriction in May 2024.

In July 2026, Bank of Baroda confirmed a data breach involving approximately 1 terabyte of customer files, loan documents, and audit records leaked to the dark web via a compromised employee email account, though core systems remained secure.

=== South Africa corruption controversy ===
On 4 September 2017 the South Africa Financial Intelligence Centre fined Bank of Baroda ₹ 11 million (equivalent to US$837,000) for flouting anti-corruption laws in transactions on accounts owned by the Gupta family. Following the flagging of 36 suspicious transactions through Gupta-family-owned accounts over a ten-month period valued at ₹4.2 billion, the bank tried to close the accounts. The Gupta family has filed an interdict against the bank to prevent it from closing their accounts. During February 2018, it was announced that the Bank of Baroda has given notification to the South African Reserve Bank that it would be exiting the country.

The bank played a crucial role in the Gupta family's business dealings. According to a report by the Organized Crime and Corruption Reporting Project (OCCRP), the Bank of Baroda allowed the Gupta family to move millions of dollars in alleged corrupt business transactions to offshore accounts. Although the Bank of Baroda denies the illicit behavior, the documents report that the bank's South African branch issued unapproved loan guarantees, ignored internal compliance efforts, and averted regulators from learning about suspicious transactions in a way that benefited the Guptas’ network. Around 4.5m Rand has circulated around a handful of Gupta-associated companies between 2007 and 2017. Due to the volume of Gupta-owned accounts, the majority of the bank's transactions in Johannesburg involved Gupta family funds.

Reports reveal that inter-company loans provided an untraceable and inexplicable technique used by the Gupta brothers to transfer money from the Bank to various Gupta-owned companies, like Trillion Financial Advisory and Centaur Mining. The suspicious activity reports (SARs) filed by workers at the Bank of Baroda related to Gupta transactions were often voided by managers and higher-level bank officials. Most SARs failed to reach the South African Financial Intelligence Centre as a result.

== See also ==
- Indian banking
- Indian Financial System Code
- List of banks in India
