= Sudhir Ruparelia =

Ugandan businessman

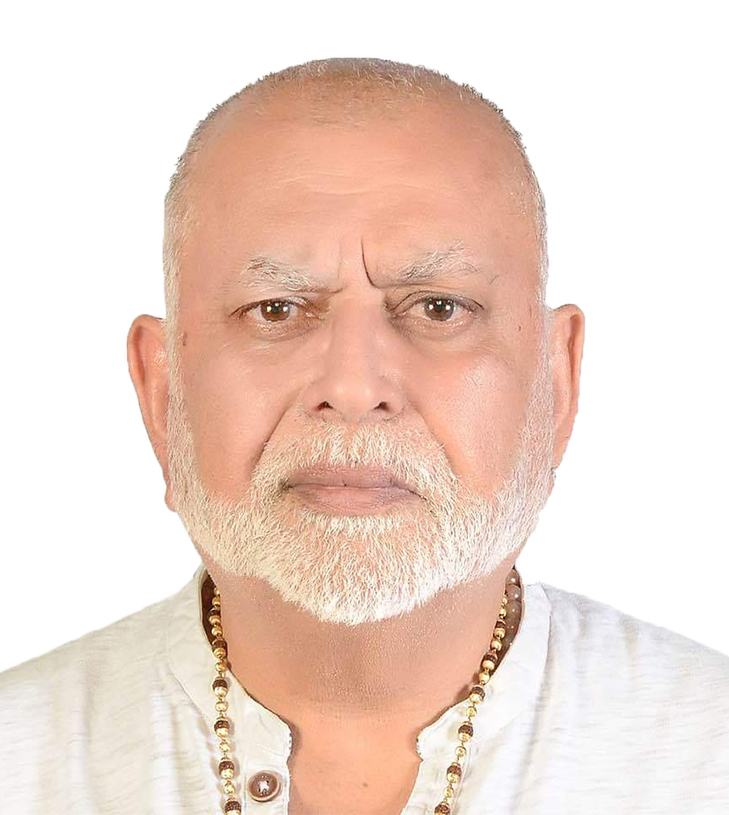
- Born: 17 January 1956 (age 70); Kabatoro, Kasese, Protectorate of Uganda
- Occupation: Businessman
- Years active: 1986 - present
- Spouse: Jyotsna Ruparelia (m. 1977)
- Children: Rajiv, Sheena, Meera

Sudhir Ruparelia (born 17 January 1956) is a Ugandan business magnate and investor. He is the chairman and majority shareholder in the Ruparelia Group companies. His investments are mainly in the banking, insurance, education, broadcasting, real estate, floriculture and hospitality sectors.

== Biography ==
Ruparelia was born in Kabatoro, Kasese District in the Western Region of Uganda to an upper-middle-class Indian Gujarati family. His great-grandfather moved from India to Mombasa, Kenya in 1897, and set up a trading store there, before moving to Uganda in 1903. His grandfather was born in Uganda in 1908 and his father was also born in Uganda in 1932.

Ruparelia has two sisters and one brother. He attended Bat Valley Primary School in Kampala, from P1 to P6, then Jinja Main Street Primary School in Jinja for P7 and Jinja Secondary School. In 1971, he joined Kololo Senior Secondary School.

Ruparelia fled to the United Kingdom with his parents in 1972 at the age of 16, when then Ugandan president Idi Amin expelled all Asians from Uganda.

Ruparelia returned to Uganda in 1985, with US$25,000 earned from several casual jobs including working in supermarkets, factories, and butcheries. Ruparelia started selling beer and spirits imported from Kenya. In 1989, beer importation was banned to encourage local brewing of alcohol, and he realized he could not make beer. But since his customers, who were mainly foreigners, paid him in foreign currency, he started Crane Forex Bureau, the first in Uganda. With his profits, Mr Ruparelia ventured into other businesses, including forming Crane Bank in 1995. Later, he organized his businesses under the umbrella of the Ruparelia Group.

In 2007, Ruparelia was awarded an honorary Doctor of Laws degree in business by the Uganda Pentecostal University in recognition of his contribution to Uganda's economic growth.

== Trading career debut and history ==
As a young man in England, Ruparelia successfully established a number of small businesses before returning to Uganda in the 1980s to take advantage of the improving political and business stability.

Ruparelia started Ruparelia Group as a small trading firm in 1985 at 29 years of age with US$25,000 he returned with as savings accumulated from several jobs in the UK where his family had sought asylum after expulsion of Indians from Uganda.

As a result of the 5-year civil war, the breweries of Uganda had been ruined which made it rewarding to import beer, with household goods, from Kenya. Ruparelia opened a wholesale store, in Kampala's central business district, dealing in imported beer, salt and wine In December 1986 and struck a coup when he acquired the sole rights to distribute Kenya's most premium beer brands in Uganda along with importing alcoholic beverages, Ruparelia also capitalized on importing commodities like salt, sugar and cigarettes from traders at the Mombasa ports. He positioned himself as a channel between importers and retailers and became a trusted business partner to the importers, who supplied him the items on credit and claimed payments after a couple of days, to accelerate returns. He ran the system effectively and set up the first solid distribution structure in Kampala and became the number one dealer in imported beer in Kampala.

== Establishing Crane Forex Bureau and Crane Bank ==
At the time, the vast majority of Ruparelia's customers were foreign nationals who paid for their stock in foreign currency. Ruparelia spotted opportunity. He quickly formed an informal foreign exchange business. It was then unexploited market in Uganda and although the sector then operated informally the demand was overwhelming and the business became an immediate success from which Ruparelia was making daily profits of about $10,000. He started investing part of the proceeds in prime properties in Kampala. In 1989, President Yoweri Museveni banned the importation of beer in an effort to encourage indigenous manufacturing of alcohol but Ruparelia was not interested in producing beer and decided to focus on his informal Forex business instead.

By 1990, the forex businesses had bourgeoned in Uganda and the government moved in with a regulatory policy to govern them hence introducing licensing requirements in order to operate. Ruparelia's Crane Forex bureau became the first to be licensed in Uganda and within 6 months, he had started making more money than the commercial banks in the country . The said banks were operating incompetently with arrogance as if they were doing customers a favour, on top of charging exorbitant interest rates yet there were limited choices. This caused much frustration to Ruparelia who was a customer propelling him to create a bank with professionalism in operations and charging low interest rates and in 1995 he started and launched Crane Bank with US$1 million and came up with a motto for his new bank: Serving To Grow And Growing To Serve.

He lowered bank charges and extended banking hours, becoming the first commercial bank to operate up to 5 pm and on Saturdays. The bank won the Banker of the Year awards in: 2003, 2005, 2006, 2007, 2008 and 2009 by the Financial Times in London. In 2011, the bank posted a 32.3 increment in profit before tax, rising to Shs 90.23 billion ($37 million) from Shs 68.19 billion ($28 million) in 2010 and by 2012, Crane bank was worth $120 million in capital with 38 branches across the Uganda.

In September 2012, Crane Bank acquired the assets and some of the liabilities of the National Bank of Commerce, a small, indigenous, financial services provider in Uganda that had lost its banking license.

On 30 January 2014, Crane Bank established Crane Bank Rwanda Limited, a wholly owned subsidiary, with the first branch in Rwanda opening to customers on 30 June 2014.

The bank was a large financial services provider in Uganda and As of 31 December 2015, Crane Bank's assets were UGX:1.81 trillion, with shareholders' equity of UGX:281.43 billion. In October 2015, it had more than 750,000 customers.

Bank and Forex Bureau Closure by Central Bank

On 20 October 2016, the central bank of Uganda took control of Crane Bank, the largest subsidiary of the Ruparelia Group, due to undercapitalization and sold it to Dfcu Bank in 2017 for UShs 200 billion ( US$53,321,780).

In April 2017, the central bank of Uganda shut down his four forex bureaus as a result of unrenewed licenses. In March 2019, BoU paid Ruparelia Shs280m (US$74,650.49) for the closed forex bureaus.

=== Uganda Supreme Court orders return of Crane Bank to Ruparelia ===
In July 2022, the Ugandan Supreme Court ruled that Crane Bank be reverted to Ruparelia and asked Bank Of Uganda to pay the costs, alluding to fraudulent transactions by Bank Of Uganda.

== Wealth ==
Ruparelia became Uganda's first billionaire in 2014 and was East Africa's richest person, Africa's 28th and his Crane Bank was one of Uganda's top 3 banks. As of November 2023, Ruparelia was the second wealthiest person in Uganda, with an estimated net worth of US$1.2 billion.

== Diplomatic work ==
In February 2020, Ruparelia was appointed honorary Consul of the Republic of Nepal to Uganda, by Bidhya Devi Bhandari, the president of Nepal. On 17 March 2020, he presented his credentials to Samuel Kutesa, Uganda's foreign minister. He reports to the nearest substantive Nepalese embassy, in Cairo, Egypt.

== Personal life ==
Ruparelia lives in Kololo, Kampala. He owns the largest domestic residence in East Africa with 13,000 square metres (140,000 ft^{2}). Ruparelia has been married to Jyotsna since 1977. Together, they are parents to three children: Meera, Sheena, and Rajiv. Ruparelia has 4 grandchildren.

Meera Ruparelia, his oldest child, was born on 12 December 1985. She is married to Ravi Kotecha since June, 2010 and together they have one daughter. Meera is the Head of Developments at Meera Investments which manages over 400 properties in the country, the Senior Property Manager at Crane Management Services from June 2010 to date. She is a member on the Board of Trustees of the Ruparelia Foundation and shares a passion for wildlife and environment conservation with her father. She holds a BSc. Investment and Financial Risk Management from City University, London.

Sheena Ruparelia is Sudhir's second daughter. She was born on 23 December 1988, and she is married to Jay Sakaria since 2016. They have two daughters together. Sheena holds a Bachelor of Science in Economics and Accountancy from City University, London. In addition to being the Director of the Ruparelia Group, she is also a member of the Board of Trustees of the Ruparelia Foundation.

Rajiv Ruparelia was Sudhir's only son, born on 2 January 1990. He married Naiya Khagram Ruparelia in 2017 and together they had one daughter. He was a graduate of Financial Management from Regents College London.

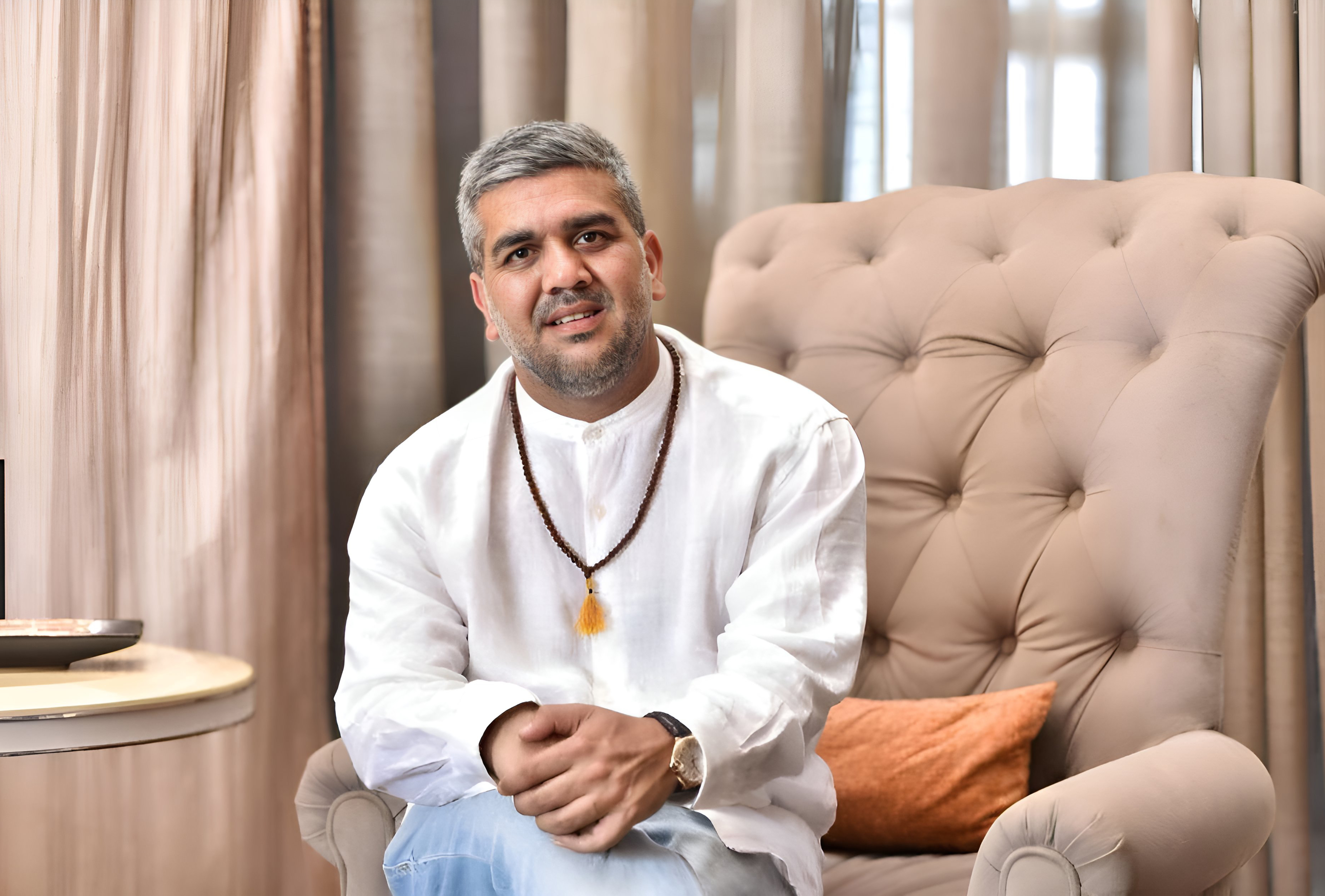
Rajiv Ruparelia in 2024

Rajiv followed Sudhir into the business world and he managed several family businesses. He was serving as the Managing Director of the Ruparelia Group. On 3 May 2025, Rajiv was involved in a fatal car crash and was confirmed to have died from his injuries at the age of 35 years. He was the sole occupant of his car (Nissan GTR) and according to cctv footage was speeding at the time of the incident.

== Awards and honors ==
- On October 9, 2013, Ruparelia was awarded a Golden Jubilee Presidential Medal by President Museveni in recognition of his contribution to the growth of business and industry in Uganda as an industrialist.

== See also ==
- Victoria University Uganda
- Banking in Uganda
- Ahmed Omar Mandela
