= Hilton Hotels & Resorts =

Hotels and resorts company

- Type: Subsidiary
- Industry: Hospitality
- Founded: May 31, 1919; 107 years ago (as Hilton Hotels)
- Founder: Conrad Hilton
- Headquarters: McLean, Virginia, U.S.
- Number of locations: 584 hotels (December 31, 2019)
- Area served: Worldwide
- Parent: Hilton Worldwide
- Website: hilton.com

Hilton Hotels & Resorts (formerly known as Hilton Hotels) is a global brand of full-service hotels and resorts and the flagship brand of American multinational hospitality company Hilton Worldwide.

The original company was founded by Conrad Hilton. As of December 30, 2019, 584 Hilton Hotels & Resorts properties with 216,379 rooms in 94 countries and territories are located across six continents. This includes 61 properties that are owned or leased with 219,264 rooms, 272 that are managed with 119,612 rooms, and 251 that are franchised with 77,451 rooms. In 2020, Fortune magazine ranked Hilton Hotels & Resorts at number one on their Fortune List of the Top 100 Companies to Work For in 2020 based on an employee survey of satisfaction.

== Overview ==
Conrad Hilton founded the Hilton hotel chain in 1919, when he bought his first property, the Mobley Hotel, in Cisco, Texas. The first hotel to feature the Hilton brand was the Dallas Hilton. In late 2010, Hilton announced a name change of the Hilton Hotels brand to Hilton Hotels & Resorts along with a new logo design, as part of a rebranding effort for the flagship brand.

Today, Hilton Hotels & Resorts is Hilton's flagship brand and one of the largest hotel brands in the world. The brand is targeted at both business and leisure travelers with locations in major city centers, near airports, convention centers, and popular vacation destinations around the world.

Hilton Hotels & Resorts participates in Hilton Honors, Hilton's guest-loyalty program established in 1989. Members who book directly through Hilton-owned channels receive exclusive discounts and amenities such as free Wi-Fi, digital check-in, keyless entry, and the ability to use a mobile app to choose specific rooms.

In 2015, approximately 20 Hilton Hotels & Resorts properties were inducted into the Historic Hotels of America organization. Among these hotels were Hilton Fort Worth, which hosted John F. Kennedy's final speech, and Hilton Hawaiian Village Waikiki Beach Resort, the setting of the film Blue Hawaii.

== Accommodation ==
		U.S.	Americas (excl. US)	Europe	Middle E. & Africa	Asia Pacific	Total
2013	Properties	246	42	151	50	65	554
2013	Rooms	100,118	14,662	40,121	16,100	25,669	196,670
2014	Properties	239	43	152	51	75	560
2014	Rooms	98,567	14,921	41,902	16,693	28,964	201,047
2015	Properties	238	45	154	52	83	572
2015	Rooms	99,807	15,486	42,456	16,872	32,014	206,635
2016	Properties	241	43	143	52	91	570
2016	Rooms	101,016	14,910	41,117	16,658	35,061	208,762
2017	Properties	244	43	142	51	98	578
2017	Rooms	102,367	15,109	40,724	16,030	37,193	211,423
2018	Properties	244	48	138	50	106	586
2018	Rooms	102,862	16,791	40,046	16,214	39,710	215,623
2019	Properties	242	48	135	50	109	584
2019	Rooms	101,880	16,956	39,520	17,089	40,934	216,379
2020	Properties	239	49	131	47	114	580
2020	Rooms	100,381	17,099	38,946	16,495	41,867	214,788
2021	Properties	246	55	127	45	125	598
2021	Rooms	103,154	18,913	38,170	16,216	45,329	221,782
2022	Properties	246	55	127	47	129	604
2022	Rooms	102,766	19,205	38,122	17,111	47,166	224,370
2023	Properties	246	57	126	49	135	613
2023	Rooms	103,593	19,392	37,917	17,187	47,926	226,015

== Notable properties ==
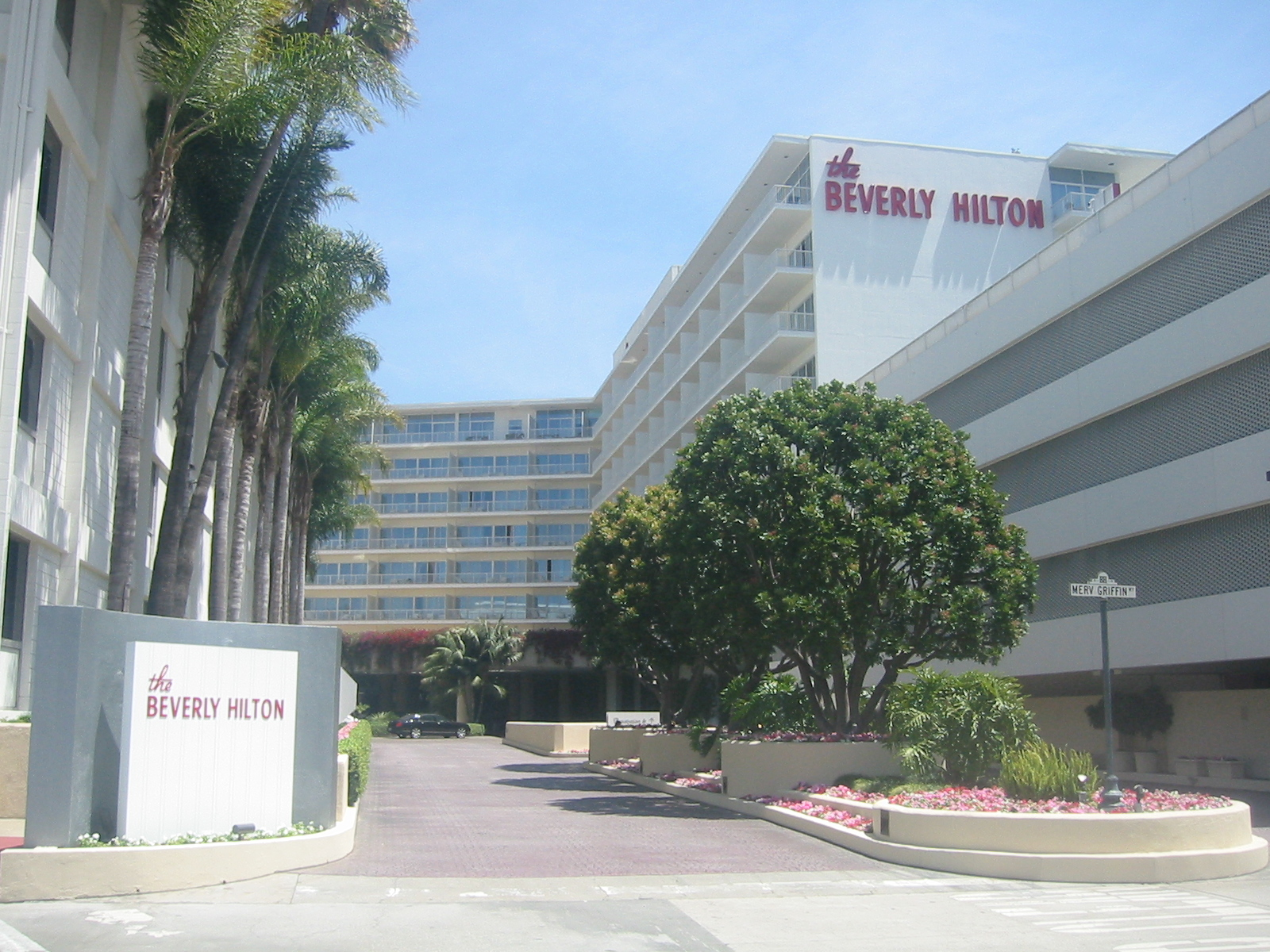
The Beverly Hilton in Beverly Hills

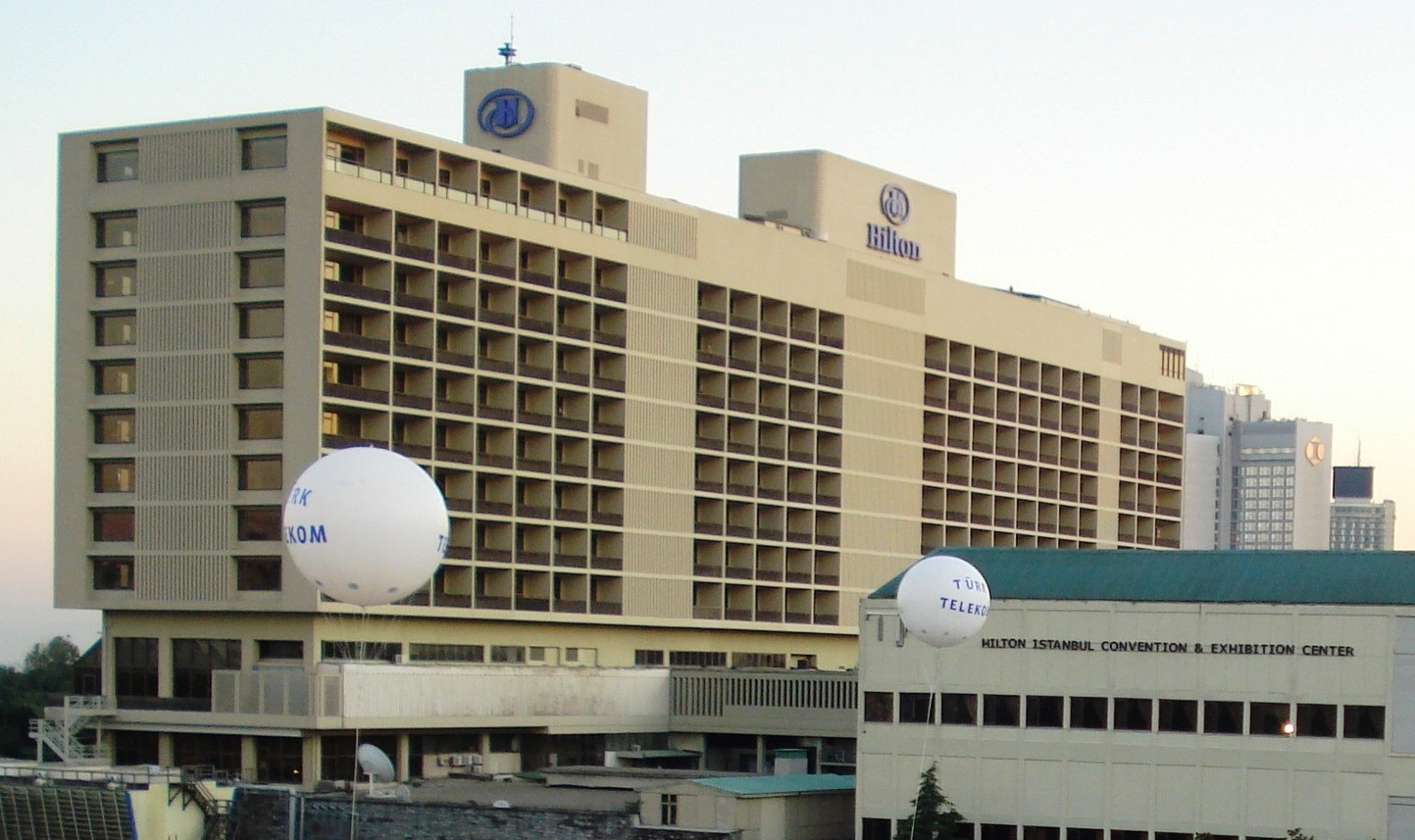
Hilton Istanbul Bosphorus was built in 1955 as the Istanbul Hilton, the second Hilton hotel in Europe (the first was the Castellana Hilton, in Madrid, in 1953). The Istanbul Hilton is currently the longest serving Hilton hotel outside the United States. It appeared in the James Bond film From Russia with Love (1963).

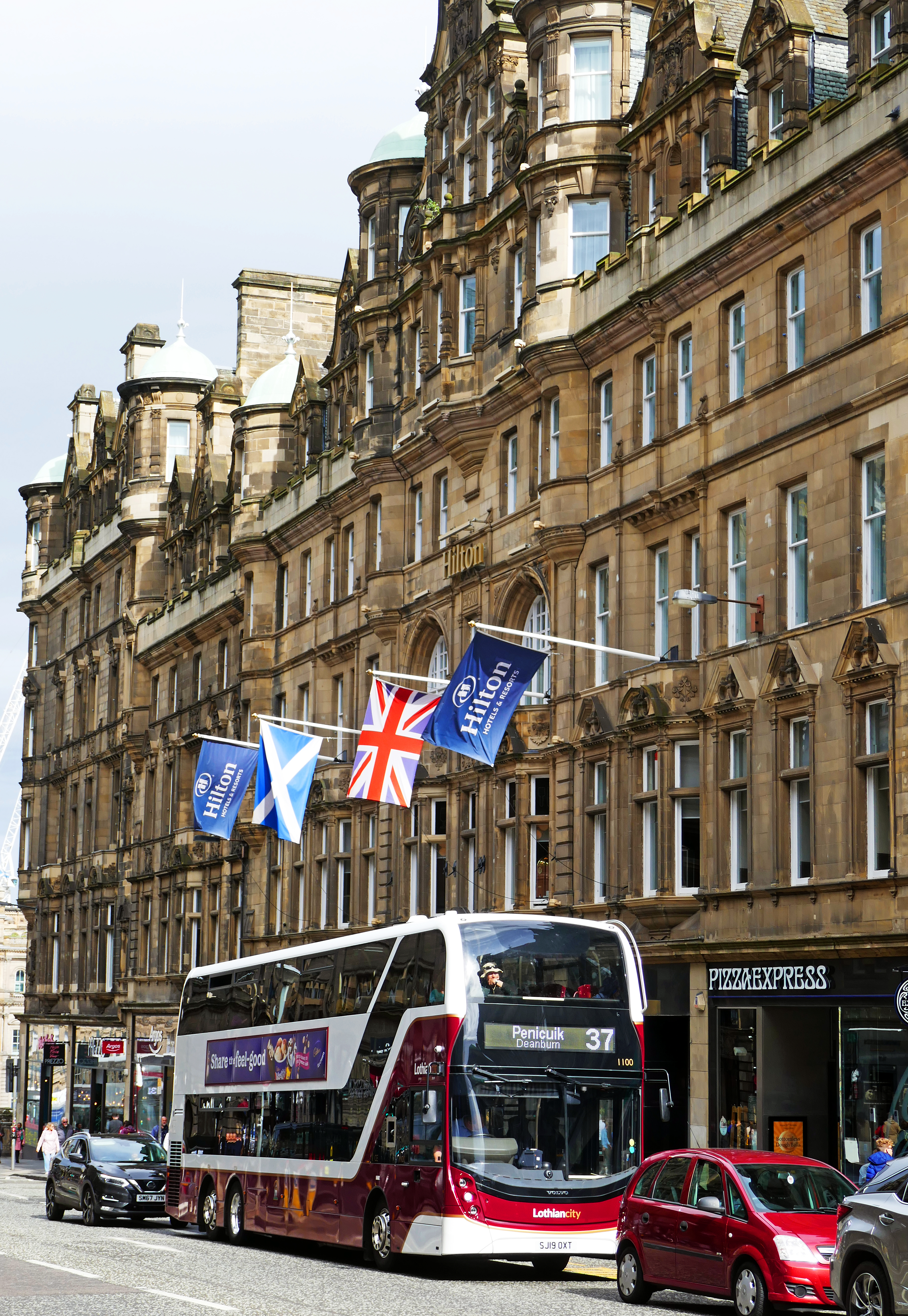
The Hilton Edinburgh Carlton in Edinburgh, Scotland

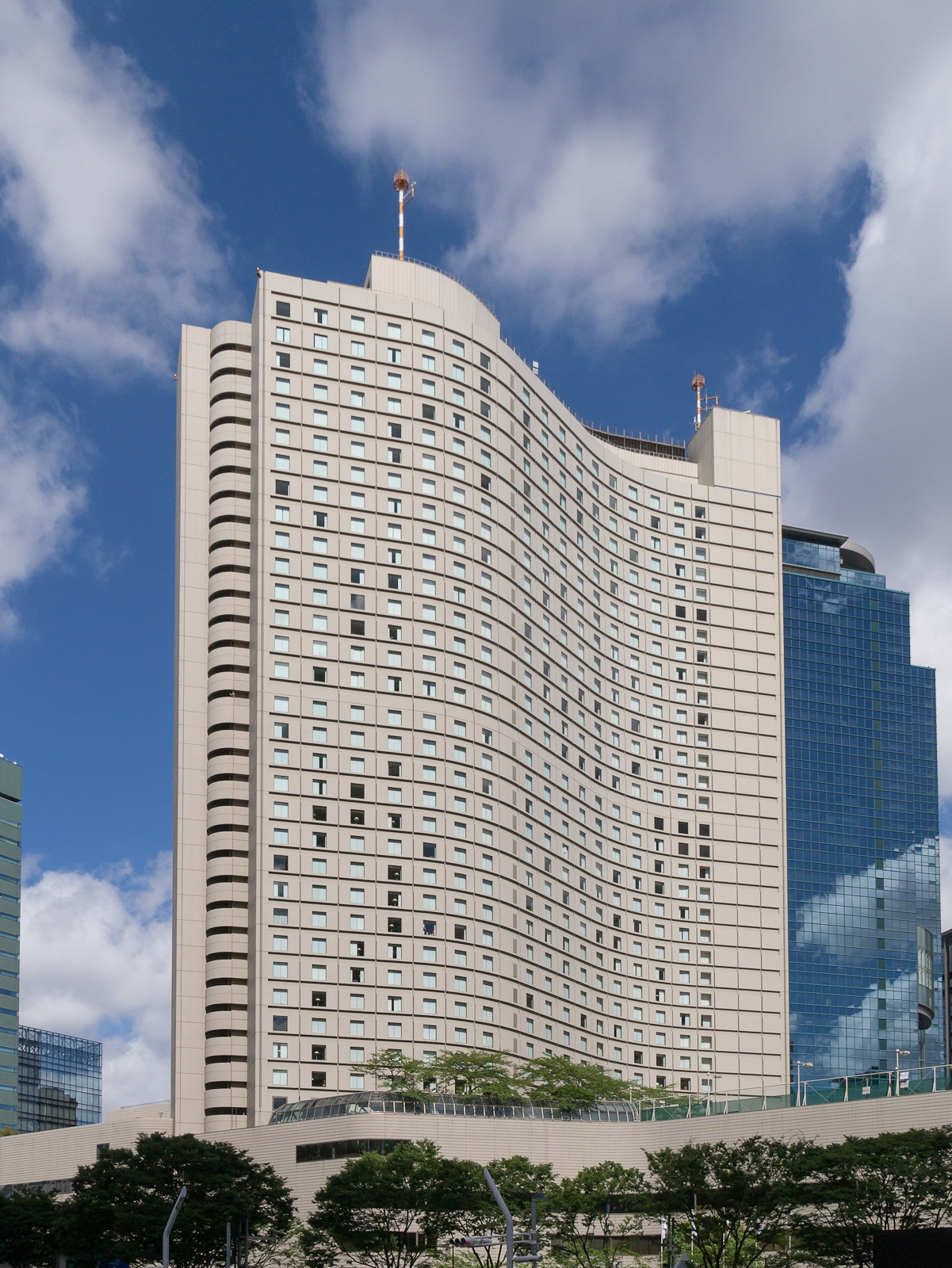
Hilton Tokyo

Hilton Colombo, Sri Lanka

Hilton Athens in Athens, Greece: The hotel opened on April 20, 1963, as Athens' first international chain hotel. Conrad Hilton was present at the opening ceremony.

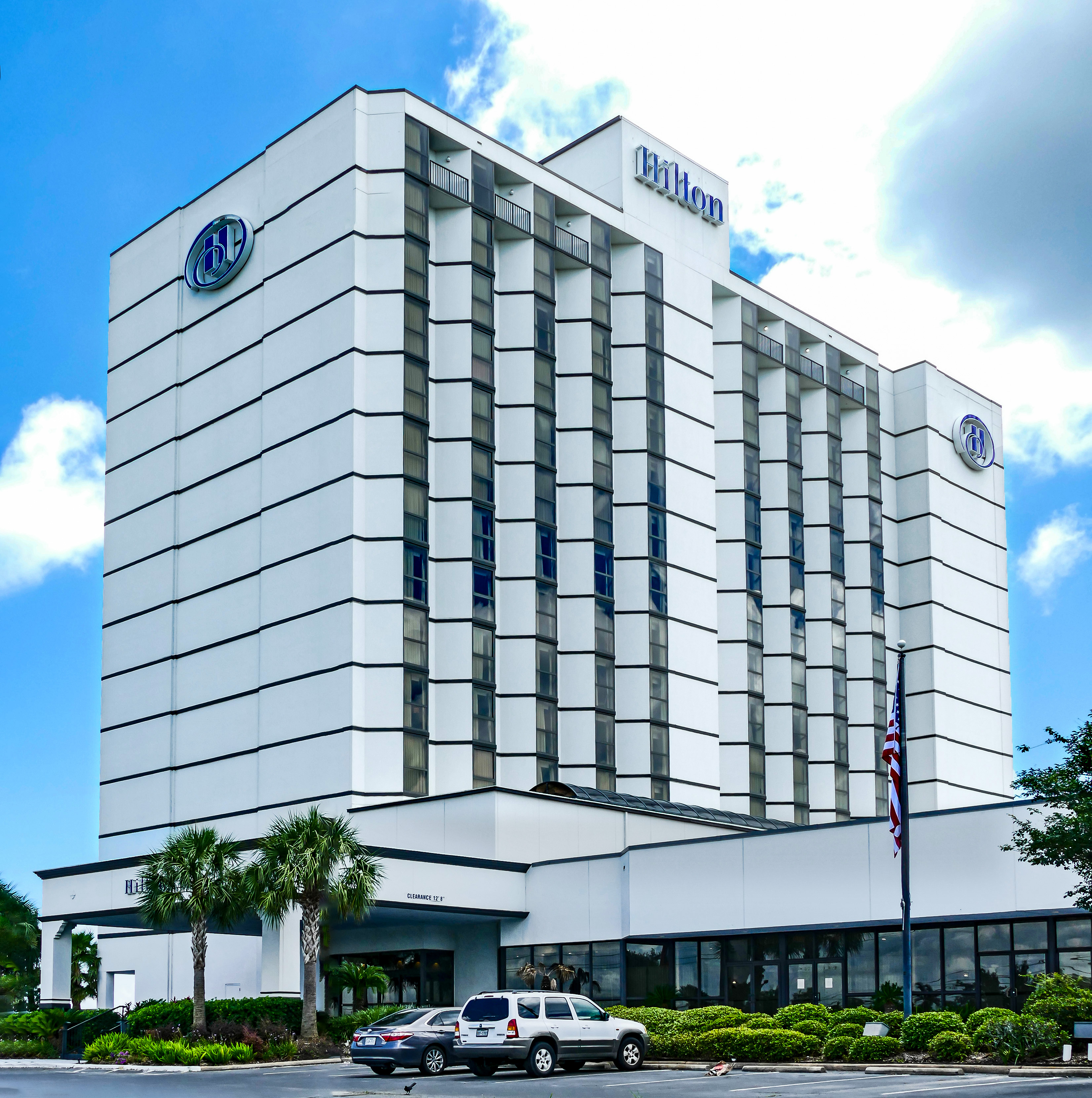
Hilton Houston NASA Clear Lake - Houston, Texas

- Addis Ababa, Ethiopia: The Hilton Addis, a landmark hotel in Addis Ababa, was designed to resemble the rock-hewn churches of Lalibela. Hilton was given a 50-year contract to manage the hotel under the condition that it will not open any other property in the city.
- Albuquerque, United States: The Hilton Hotel in Albuquerque was opened in 1939 as the first Hilton-branded hotel outside Texas and the first high-rise in Albuquerque. It was sold to other companies in 1974 and subsequently left the chain, but ended up with Hilton again in 2019, after which it was branded as part of the Curio Collection. It has been included in the National Register of Historic Places since 1984.
- Algiers, Algeria: The Hilton Alger first opened in 1993, but closed a year later after the assassination of a representative from Daewoo, which supervised the hotel's construction, during the height of the Algerian Civil War. It reopened as an independent hotel in 1997 and became a Hilton again in 2000, before it closed for the second time in 2017.
- Amsterdam, Netherlands: John Lennon and Yoko Ono held their first Bed-In for Peace between March 25 and 31, 1969, at the Hilton Amsterdam, in Room 902 (renumbered to Room 702 during renovation). This room became a popular tourist destination.
- Anaheim, United States: The Hilton Anaheim, located next to the Anaheim Convention Center, opened in time for the 1984 Summer Olympics. It is the largest hotel in Orange County.
- Antananarivo, Madagascar: The Madagascar Hilton, opened in 1970, has been described as the city's only "true" high-rise building. It left the chain in 2007 and is currently known as the Hotel Carlton Madagascar.
- Athens, Greece: The Hilton Athens opened in 1963 as the city's first international-branded hotel. The International Olympic Committee based themselves from the hotel during the 2004 Summer Olympics. The hotel closed in 2022 for renovations, with plans to rebrand it as a Conrad.
- Atlantic City, United States: The Atlantic Club Casino Hotel, the city's first and only locals casino, was managed by Hilton between 1996 and 2011.
- Austin, United States: The Hilton Austin Hotel is connected by an overhead walkway to the Austin Convention Center.
- Baltimore, United States: The Hilton Baltimore is located near the Baltimore Convention Center. Its construction has generated controversy for blocking the city's view from the grandstand of Oriole Park at Camden Yards.
- Barcelona, Spain:
  - Hilton Barcelona opened in 1990 after a few decades of legal wrangling, during which time its original proposed location was repurposed as a hospital.
  - The Hilton Diagonal Mar Barcelona opened in 2004 as the second Hilton property in the city, following the Hilton Barcelona.
- Baton Rouge, United States: The historic Hilton Baton Rouge Capitol Center, formerly the Heidelberg Hotel, has hosted such guests as John F. Kennedy, Hubert Humphrey, Jimmy Carter, and Fidel Castro. The hotel closed in 1985, before reopening as a Hilton in 2006.
- Beirut, Lebanon: With construction on the Beirut Hilton finished, the hotel was scheduled to open on April 14, 1975, but the Lebanese Civil War erupted exactly one day before the Grand Opening date, April 13. The hotel never opened and was severely damaged during the war, and the building was demolished in the late 1990s. However, two different hotels later opened in 2011 under the Hilton name in the city's eastern suburb, the Hilton Beirut Metropolitan Palace and the Hilton Beirut Grand Habtoor, which face each other. Both are conversions from independent hotels.
- Belgrade, Serbia: In March 2018, Hilton opened their first hotel in Serbia, Hilton Belgrade.
- Beverly Hills, United States: The Beverly Hilton is known for hosting the annual Golden Globe Awards. It hosted Richard Nixon's "last press conference" following his defeat in the 1962 California gubernatorial election. Singer Whitney Houston died on February 11, 2012, in the hotel's Suite 434, which was subsequently retired and repurposed.
- Birmingham, United Kingdom: With nearly 800 rooms and suites, the Hilton Birmingham Metropole is the largest hotel in the United Kingdom outside London. It was originally two separate hotels that were joined by a tunnel in 1988.
- Boston, United States: The Hilton Boston Park Plaza was a Statler Hotel acquired by Hilton in 1954. It was the first hotel in the world to offer radio in all rooms.
- Bridgetown, Barbados: On October 24, 1999, the four double columns of the left-hand side of the then-modern Barbados Hilton in Needhams Point collapsed and imploded inwards in just 10 to 15 seconds during an earthquake. It was later demolished in May 2005 after Hilton Hotels constructed a new property in January that year.
- Budapest, Hungary: The Hilton Budapest includes renovated parts of a historical Dominican cloister and monastery from the 13th century. It is located just across the street from the Fisherman's Bastion and Matthias Church.
- Buenos Aires, Argentina: The Hilton Buenos Aires is prominently featured in the acclaimed Argentine film Nine Queens (2000).
- Cardiff, United Kingdom: The Hilton Cardiff, located south of the City Hall and overlooking the Cardiff Castle, has been described as the "glitziest hotel in Cardiff".
- Cartagena, Colombia: Opened in 1980 on the secluded tip of El Laguito neighborhood within Bocagrande, the Hilton Cartagena was envisioned as an urban resort where the city meets the sea. Its tiered tower, shaped like the bow of a ship, quickly became part of the coastal skyline. Beyond hosting conventions, it became nationally known when its pool turned into a televised runway for the Miss Colombia.
- Chennai, India: The Hilton Chennai is located near the Olympia Tech Park, a prominent IT center in the city.
- Chicago, United States:
  - The Palmer House Hilton is a historic hotel in the Chicago Loop. It is notable for being the city's first hotel to feature elevators, electric light bulbs, and telephones. It has been dubbed the longest-operating hotel in North America, although it was temporarily closed for a year during the COVID-19 pandemic.
  - The Hilton Chicago figured prominently in the 1968 Democratic Convention police riot that occurred on Michigan Avenue and across the street in Grant Park on August 28. During the riot the demonstrators took up the chant "The whole world is watching", and the hotel's doors were locked for the first time in its history. The hotel suffered minor damage as a result of the violence, and a couple of street-level windows gave way under the weight of dozens of protesters being pushed up against them by the police.
  - The Drake Hotel was formerly a longtime rival of The Palmer House, before it was acquired by Hilton International in 1980 and operated under its Vista Hotels brand. It became a Hilton proper in 2005.
- Cincinnati, United States: The Hilton Cincinnati Netherland Plaza was once the tallest building in Cincinnati until the 2010 completion of the Great American Tower at Queen City Square. It is a member of the Historic Hotels of America.
- Cleveland, United States: The Hilton Cleveland Downtown Hotel, opened in 2016, is the first major hotel in the city since the 1991 opening of Marriott at Key Center. With 600 rooms, it is the largest hotel in Cleveland.
- Colombo, Sri Lanka:
  - The Hilton Colombo is located next to the World Trade Center Colombo.
  - The Hilton Colombo Residences, formerly the JAIC Hilton, opened as the second Hilton property in Colombo in 1998.
- Colorado Springs, United States: The Antlers Hotel, with history dating back to the 19th century, was managed by Hilton following its purchase by Morgan Stanley in 2003. It left the chain in 2015 and became a Wyndham.
- Columbus, United States: The Hilton Columbus Downtown includes two buildings on the western and eastern sides of High Street and is the city's largest hotel.
- Dallas, United States:
  - The first hotel to bear the Hilton name was the Dallas Hilton, a high-rise that opened in 1925. The hotel left the chain in 1938 and is currently operated by IHG Hotels & Resorts under the Hotel Indigo brand.
  - The Hilton Anatole opened in 2005 as a rebranding of the former Wyndham Anatole. The hotel dates back to 1979 as part of the Dallas Market Center complex and was used as the headquarters of Ronald Reagan's campaign staff during the 1984 Republican National Convention.
- Detroit, United States: The Detroit Hilton was one of the Statler Hotels Hilton acquired in 1954 and was in operation until its 1975 abandonment.
- Fort Worth, United States:
  - The Hilton Fort Worth, historically known as Hotel Texas, was built in 1921. On November 22, 1963, John F. Kennedy gave his last address in the hotel's Crystal Ballroom, a few hours before his assassination in Dallas. It was operated as a Sheraton from 1968 to 1979, a Hyatt Regency from 1981 to 1995, and a Radisson from 1995 to 2006, before becoming a Hilton from 2006 onwards.
  - The Blackstone Hotel, the tallest hotel in Downtown Fort Worth, was managed by Hilton from 1952 to 1962.
- Frankfurt, Germany: The Hilton Frankfurt Airport is one of the two Hilton properties inside The Squaire groundscraper, alongside the Hilton Garden Inn Frankfurt Airport.
- Glasgow, United Kingdom: The Hilton Glasgow is located in the Anderston commercial zone, on top of a proposed extension of Anderston Centre. It hosted the award ceremonies of the 2014 Commonwealth Games.
- Hanoi, Vietnam: The Hilton Hanoi Opera has been awarded "Vietnam's Leading Hotel" for five consecutive years between 2004 and 2008. It closed in 2022 for a planned refurbishment into a Waldorf Astoria.
- Havana, Cuba: The Habana Hilton was Latin America's largest and tallest hotel at the time of its opening in 1958. Following the Cuban Revolution, it famously became the residence of Fidel Castro and other Cuban revolutionaries. Hilton continued to manage the property until 1960, when the Cuban government nationalized all private properties. Since 1993, the hotel has been managed by Meliá Hotels International under their TRYP by Wyndham brand.
- Helsinki, Finland: The Hilton Helsinki Kalastajatorppa was originally a 1910s fisherman's croft, before it became a restaurant and eventually a hotel. Hilton inherited management of the property during its ownership of Scandic Hotels from 2001 to 2007.
- Hong Kong, China: The Hong Kong Hilton, opened in 1963, was one of Hilton's first properties in Asia, alongside the Tokyo Hilton. It was the first hotel in the world to include a minibar within all of its hotel rooms. The hotel closed in 1995 and has been demolished to make way for the Cheung Kong Center.
- Honolulu, United States:
  - With 3,386 rooms, the Hilton Hawaiian Village is the second-largest Hilton property in the world, after the Resorts World Las Vegas.
  - The Kahala Hilton, opened in 1964, was a popular retreat for celebrities and other dignitaries, with notable guests including Frank Sinatra, Elton John, Elizabeth II, and Desmond Tutu. It left the Hilton system in 1995.
- Houston, United States: The Shamrock Hotel, constructed next to the Texas Medical Center, was the largest hotel built in the U.S. during the 1940s. It was operated as the Shamrock Hilton from 1955 until 1985, when Hilton sold the loss-making property to the Texas Medical Center, which demolished it.
- Indianapolis, United States: The Hilton Indianapolis was converted from an office of the Blue Cross Blue Shield Association, first built in 1970. It was the tallest hotel in the city until the construction of the JW Marriott Indianapolis.
- Istanbul, Turkey: The Hilton Istanbul Bosphorus is Hilton's first post–World War II property and is the longest operating Hilton Hotel outside the United States, having been continuously managed by the company since its opening in 1955.
- İzmir, Turkey: The Hilton Izmir was the tallest building in İzmir prior to the completion of the Folkart Towers. After 30 years in service, the hotel closed in 2020.
- Kansas City, United States: Hilton began managing the historic Hotel President since 2005 as the Hilton President Kansas City.
- Kathmandu, Nepal: In 2024, Hilton announced the opening of a hotel in the Nakshal area of Kathmandu, managed by the Shanker Group. It was the tallest hotel in the city and had a glass façade that represented prayer flags. The building was set on fire and destroyed during the 2025 Gen Z protests; only a charred shell remains.
- Kuala Lumpur, Malaysia: In 2004, the Hilton Kuala Lumpur was opened on KL Sentral, directly opposite the main entrance to the Sentral Terminal, as the replacement for their former premises in Jalan Sultan Ismail. The latter was the first internationally run hotel in the city when opening in 1973, and changed management in 2002 (renamed Crowne Plaza Mutiara) before being demolished in 2015 for a (currently on hold) mixed-use development.
- Kyiv, Ukraine: The Hilton Kyiv is part of a 25-level, multipurpose building called the H-Tower, with the hotel occupying floors 3–8.
- Lake Buena Vista, United States: The Hilton Orlando Lake Buena Vista and Hilton Orlando Buena Vista Palace are two of the seven non-Disney-affiliated hotels in the Disney Springs Resort Area, part of the Walt Disney World.
- Las Vegas, United States:
  - The Las Vegas Hilton was rebranded from the former International Hotel in 1971. An extension in 1981 added 391 rooms to the existing 2,783, which made it the largest hotel in the world until 1990. The Las Vegas Hilton was one of Hilton's most successful properties until the Great Recession. The hotel exited the Hilton system in 2012 and is currently managed by Westgate Resorts.
  - The Flamingo Las Vegas, a brainchild of Bugsy Siegel, was operated by Hilton between 1974 and 2000. Under Hilton, the property's four towers were built, while the last remnants of the original Flamingo were torn down.
  - The Las Vegas Hilton at Resorts World is one of the three Hilton-managed hotels in the Resorts World Las Vegas complex, alongside a Conrad and an LXR hotel. Together, they represent the largest Hilton property in the world, with 3,506 rooms combined.
- Laughlin, United States: The Aquarius Casino Resort, the largest hotel in Laughlin, was initially operated as the Flamingo Hilton Laughlin, a branch of the Las Vegas property, before leaving the chain in 2000.
- Lexington, United States: The Hilton Lexington/Downtown opened in 1982 as a Radisson, before becoming a Hilton in 2009.
- London, United Kingdom:
  - The London Hilton on Park Lane is the first skyscraper hotel in London. The Beatles first met Maharishi Mahesh Yogi there, which spurred their decision to go to India. It was the site of a bombing by the Provisional Irish Republican Army in September 1975, which killed two people and injured 63. On 15 January 2018, Irish singer Dolores O'Riordan of The Cranberries died of alcohol intoxication in her room in the hotel.
  - The Hilton London Hyde Park was rebranded in 1999 from the Coburg Hotel, which dates back to 1907. It was a filming location for the film Frenzy (1972).
  - The Hilton London Metropole opened in 1972 as part of the Metropole chain. It was sold to Stakis Hotels in 1996, ultimately ending up with Hilton International a few years later.
  - The Hilton London Paddington was formerly the Great Western Royal Hotel, a historic accommodation within the London Paddington station complex that has been in continuous operation since 1854. Following the privatization of the British Rail, it was sold to the private sector in 1983 and ended up with Hilton in 2001.
  - The Waldorf Hilton is a historic hotel in the Aldwych, built by William Waldorf Astor in 1908. Despite its name and ownership, it is considered part of the Hilton brand, not the Waldorf Astoria one.
  - Hilton started managing The Trafalgar St. James London, a building that was used by Cunard, from 2001. It was branded a Hilton from 2001 to 2017, when it was reclassified as part of the Curio Collection.
  - The historic five-star Langham Hotel was acquired by Ladbroke Group, the owner of Hilton International at the time, in 1986 and operated as the Langham Hilton until 1995.
- Longview, United States: Conrad Hilton purchased the Gregg Hotel in 1936, naming it the Longview Hilton, until he sold it to Tom Young & Associates in 1947.
- Louisville, United States: The Seelbach Hilton Louisville is designed after the French Renaissance style and became an inspiration for a hotel in F. Scott Fitzgerald's The Great Gatsby.
- Manchester, United Kingdom: The Hilton Manchester Deansgate is housed within the Beetham Tower (also known as the Hilton Tower), which held the record as the tallest building in Manchester from its conception until 2018, when it was surpassed by the South Tower at Deansgate Square.
- Memphis, United States: The Hilton Memphis, the tallest hotel in Memphis, first opened as a Hyatt Regency in 1975. It became part of Hilton in 2004.
- Mexico City, Mexico: The Hilton Mexico City Reforma was previously a Sheraton before Hilton took over in 2009. It is the first tall building to be constructed in the city following the 1985 Mexico City earthquake.
- Milwaukee, United States: The Hilton Milwaukee City Center, built in the Art Deco style, opened as the Schroeder Hotel in 1928. It is part of the Historic Hotels of America.
- Minneapolis, United States: The Hilton Minneapolis is the largest hotel in the state of Minnesota.
- Moscow, Russia: The Hilton Moscow Leningradskaya is part of the Seven Sisters, a group of Stalinist-styled seven skyscrapers, and was designed to be the most luxurious hotel in Moscow.
- Mumbai, India: The Trident Hotel, Nariman Point was co-operated by Hilton under an agreement with The Oberoi Group between 2004 and 2008. The hotel was known as Hilton Towers Mumbai at the time.
- Munich, Germany: The Hilton Munich Airport, formerly a Kempinski, is located between Terminals 1 and 2 of Munich Airport.
- N'Djamena, Chad: In 2016, Hilton N'Djamena opened, in the process making Chad the 100th country Hilton began operations in worldwide. The hotel closed in November 2019.
- Nassau, The Bahamas: The British Colonial Hotel, which dates back to 1901, has been managed by Hilton since 1999. It is notable for being built on the site of the Old Fort of Nassau, as well as having the only private beach on the island.
- New Orleans, United States:
  - The Hilton New Orleans Riverside, with 1,700 rooms, is the largest hotel in New Orleans. It is connected to The Outlet Collection at Riverwalk via a walkway.
  - The Hilton New Orleans/St. Charles Avenue was converted into a hotel from a Masonic Temple in 1992. Before its temporary closure during the Hurricane Katrina, it was operated as a Hotel Monaco (a brand of Kimpton Hotels).
- New York City, United States:
  - The historic Plaza Hotel and Roosevelt Hotel in Midtown Manhattan were purchased by Conrad Hilton in 1943 and were operated as Hiltons until 1953 and 1956, respectively.
  - The Hotel Pennsylvania was one of the hotels Hilton inherited after acquiring Statler Hotels in 1954. Its telephone number, PEnnsylvania 6-5000, was the namesake of a swing jazz song and was claimed to be the oldest continuously-used telephone number in New York City. It exited the Hilton chain following its purchase by William Zeckendorf Jr. in 1979.
  - The Savoy-Plaza Hotel was purchased by Hilton in 1957 and was operated as Savoy Hilton until 1964.
  - The New York Hilton Midtown, opened in 1963, is the largest hotel in New York City and the largest Hilton hotel in the continental United States. Martin Cooper made the world's first handheld cellphone call in front of the hotel in 1973. It has counted every U.S. president since John F. Kennedy as its guest, and it was used by Donald Trump for his victory speech during the 2016 United States presidential election. It is also the host of the annual International Emmy Awards.
  - The Millennium Downtown New York Hotel was managed by Hilton as the Millennium Hilton between 1994 and 2022. It suffered extensive damage during the September 11 attacks, but was restored and eventually reopened after 18 months. The U.S. flag which flew outside the hotel is currently preserved in the hotel's lobby.
  - The Millennium Hilton New York One UN Plaza is located near the headquarters of the United Nations and was developed by the United Nations Development Corporation. The hotel first opened in 1976 as a Hyatt before it was rebranded into a Hilton in 2017.
- Niagara Falls, Canada: At 58 stories and over 530 feet high, the Hilton Niagara Falls/Fallsview Hotel and Suites is the tallest hotel in Canada.
- Nicosia, Cyprus: The Hilton Nicosia was the scene of the assassination of Youssef Sebai, an Egyptian newspaper editor and friend of Egyptian President Anwar El Sadat, on February 19, 1978. The assassination and the hijacking of a Cyprus Airways DC-8 at Larnaca Airport led to the Egyptian raid on Larnaca International Airport by Egyptian forces. The intervention by the Egyptians led to the deterioration of relations between Cyprus and Egypt.
- Oklahoma City, United States: Opened in 1911, the Skirvin Hilton Hotel is the oldest hotel in Oklahoma City and a member of the Historic Hotels of America.
- Paris, France:
  - The Paris Hilton, designed by Pierre Dufau, opened in 1961. It was located southwest of the Eiffel Tower. In 2009, it left Hilton and became part of Accor's Pullman.
  - The Hilton Paris Opéra is a historic Belle Époque-styled hotel built for the 1889 Exposition Universelle. It was purchased by Hilton in 2013.
- Pittsburgh, United States: The Hilton Pittsburgh opened in 1959, with Conrad Hilton attending the ceremony, and is the largest hotel in Pittsburgh. It exited the Hilton chain in 2010 and is currently operated by Wyndham.
- Podgorica, Montenegro: The Hilton Podgorica Crna Gora was reconstructed from Hotel Crna Gora, which was built in 1953 as a symbol of post-war reconstruction in the Montenegrin capital of Podgorica.
- Portland, United States: The Hilton Portland Downtown and the Duniway Hotel are a pair of Hilton-managed hotels in Downtown Portland. The former opened in 1962, while the latter opened in 2002. Combined, both have 782 rooms, making them the largest hotel in Portland.
- Prague, Czech Republic: The 11-floor Atrium Hotel Prague was taken over by Hilton and rebranded as Hilton Prague in 1991, shortly after the Velvet Revolution.
- Reno, United States: The Bally's Reno was rebranded as the Reno Hilton in 1992, with Hilton investing $86 million worth of renovation money. It left the Hilton chain following the spun-off of Park Place Entertainment and was rebranded Grand Sierra Resort in 2005.
- Rio de Janeiro, Brazil: The Hilton Rio de Janeiro Copacabana is the tallest building in the Leme neighborhood and originally opened in 1976 as a Le Méridien.
- San Angelo, United States: The San Angelo Hilton was opened in 1929 as one of the earliest Hilton-branded hotels. It is no longer affiliated with Hilton and is now known as the Cactus Hotel.
- San Diego, United States: The Hilton San Diego Bayfront is across the street from the San Diego Convention Center along San Diego Bay.
- San Francisco, United States:
  - The Brutalist-styled Hilton San Francisco Union Square is the largest hotel in the West Coast of the United States, with 1,921 rooms. It first opened in 1964 as the San Francisco Hilton.
  - The Hilton San Francisco Financial District, formerly the Holiday Inn Financial District from 1971 to 2005, is located on the border of San Francisco's Financial District and Chinatown. Aside from hotel, the building also houses offices for use by the Chinese Culture Center.
  - Parc 55 San Francisco began to be managed by Hilton in 2015, having previously been a Renaissance and a Wyndham property. It is located southeast of Hilton San Francisco Union Square.
- San Juan, Puerto Rico: In 1954, at the Caribe Hilton Hotel's Beachcomber Bar, Ramon "Monchito" Marrero reportedly created the Piña Colada.
- San Salvador, El Salvador: The Hilton Princess San Salvador Hotel was located across the Bambu City Center shopping mall. The hotel has left the Hilton chain and is currently operated as part of The Hotel Collection's Barceló brand.
- Santa Monica, United States: The Hilton Santa Monica Hotel & Suites, built in 1990, was rebranded from a DoubleTree in 2021.
- Seoul, South Korea: The Millennium Hilton Seoul, opened as the Seoul Hilton in 1983, was located in the Jung District. It left the chain effective on 1 January 2023.
- Singapore:
  - The Singapore Hilton was developed alongside its sister property in Kuala Lumpur in 1963, but its opening was delayed to 1970, owing to the administrative logjam caused by Singapore's departure from Malaysia. It is known for hosting the popular European restaurant Iggy's. In 2022, it left the Hilton chain and has been managed by IHG Hotels & Resorts through its Voco conversion brand.
  - The Hilton Singapore Orchard was originally named the Mandarin Singapore (unrelated to the Mandarin Oriental group) until it was converted to a Hilton in 2022. It contains the Chatterbox restaurant, known for its Hainanese chicken rice.
- Springfield, United States: The Wyndham Springfield City Centre was known as the Springfield Hilton during the company's management between 1980 and 2015. It is notable for being one of the only two chain hotels in downtown Springfield, alongside the President Abraham Lincoln Hotel.
- Sydney, Australia: On February 13, 1978, the Sydney Hilton Hotel was the site of one of the few terrorist incidents on Australian soil, when a bomb blast killed three people (two council workers and a policeman).
- Taba, Egypt: Hilton began managing the Aviya-Sonesta Beach Hotel in 1990, a hotel built by Israel during its occupation of the Sinai Peninsula, after an international panel ruled that the strip of land it sat on belonged to Egypt. Rebranded as Hilton Taba, the hotel was popular with Israeli tourists on account of its location near Eilat and its tax-free status (to this day, it is the only hotel in Egypt where Israelis do not need to pay a tax to travel to). It left the Hilton chain in 2017 and subsequently joined Deutsche Hospitality.
- Tallinn, Estonia: In June 2016, Hilton opened their first hotel in the Baltic states in Estonia, the Hilton Hotel Tallinn Park.
- Tehran, Iran: The Parsian Esteghlal International Hotel opened in 1962 as the Royal Tehran Hilton. Following the Iranian Revolution, the Iranian government severed all contracts with foreign hospitality companies, and the hotel is now a public property.
- Tel Aviv, Israel: The Hilton Tel Aviv was the largest and most modern hotel in Israel at the time of its completion in 1962.
- Toronto, Canada: Hilton managed the Harbour Castle Hotel from 1977 to 1987, when it traded with the Westin their respective Toronto hotels in a complicated management swap.
- Valencia, Spain: The Hilton Valencia was the tallest skyscraper in Valencia. It left the Hilton chain in 2010 and is now managed by Meliá Hotels International.
- Venice, Italy: The Hilton Molino Stucky was built in 1895 as a flour mill by Swiss businessman Giovanni Stucky on the western end of the Venetian island of Giudecca. After major renovations, Hilton assumed management of the building as a hotel in 2007.
- Washington, D.C., United States:
  - The Capital Hilton was originally part of the Statler Hotels chain before it was acquired by Hilton. It notably accepted Larry Doby of the Cleveland Indians as its first black guest when the team was in town in 1947. Much of the film Born Yesterday (1950) is set in the hotel, although only some scenes were shot there.
  - The Washington Hilton regularly hosts the annual National Prayer Breakfast, as well as the annual dinners of the White House Correspondents Association and Radio and Television Correspondents' Association. The 1981 attempted assassination of Ronald Reagan happened as the President was about to return to his limousine following a press conference in the hotel.
- Willemstad, Curaçao: The Curaçao Hilton, built in 1967, was one of the first international-branded hotels on the island. The property left the chain in 1983, became a Hilton again in 2003, before leaving for good in 2019. It is currently operated by Hyatt as part of its Dreams all-inclusive brand.

== Planned projects ==
A commercial space station project known as Space Islands was proposed by Hilton International in 1999 to be constructed from used Space Shuttle fuel tanks. When completed, it was to be called the Hilton Orbital Hotel. The tanks were to be connected together to form a ring, resulting in a space station similar to that pictured in the film 2001: A Space Odyssey. Plans were also drawn up for the Lunar Hilton, a 5000-room hotel on the Moon, though Steve Hilton noted in 2009 that both these plans were more symbolic than practical at this stage.

In October 2012, Hilton announced a property in the Bangladeshi capital of Dhaka, the Hilton Dhaka, designed by Mustapha Khalid Palash. As of 2023, the hotel has yet to open, though Hilton currently has a targeted 2025 opening date.

In March 2013, Hilton announced that it would be entering Myanmar for the first time with the construction of a 300-room hotel in Yangon. While the Yangon hotel has yet to materialize, Hilton did manage to open properties in Mandalay and Naypyidaw in the north of the country (although the Mandalay Hilton has since closed).

In 2018, Hilton announced two hotel projects in Kampala, Uganda: the Kampala Hilton Hotel and the Hilton Garden Inn Kampala. Both projects are still in development. A previous Hilton project in Kampala and announced in 2006 was repurposed into The Pearl of Africa Hotel Kampala, after Hilton exited the venture.

== See also ==
- Hyatt
- Sheraton Hotels and Resorts
- Marriott International
