= Hilton, Paris =

Hilton, Paris may refer to:

- Paris Hilton, an American television personality and heiress
- The Hilton Paris Opéra hotel in Paris, France (opened 2015), or one of the former Hilton Hotels & Resorts in Paris:

- the Hilton Paris, opened 1967, sold in 2009 to Accor, currently operating as Pullman Tour Eiffel
- the Hilton Arc de Triomphe (2004-2012), currently Hôtel du Collectionneur
