= Stucky =

Stucky may refer to:

== People ==
- Alfred Stucky (1892–1969), Swiss dam engineer
- Galen D. Stucky (active since 1964), American inorganic materials chemist
- Giovanni Stucky (1843–1910), Italian businessman
- Janaka Stucky (born 1978), American poet and publisher
- Lynn Stucky (born 1958), American veterinarian and politician
- Mark P. Stucky (born 1948), American astronaut
- Scott W. Stucky (born 1948), appeals court judge from Kansas
- Steven Stucky (1949−2016), American composer

== Architecture ==
- Molino Stucky, a Neo-Gothic building in Venice
- Palazzo Grassi, also known as Palazzo Grassi-Stucky, an edifice in the Venetian classical style located on the Grand Canal of Venice

== Other uses ==
- Stucky (fandom), the fan-imagined relationship between Captain America (Steve Rogers) and Bucky Barnes
- 13211 Stucky, a main-belt asteroid
