= Palazzo Foscari (Giudecca 795) =

Gothic-style palace on the Giudecca island, Venice, Italy

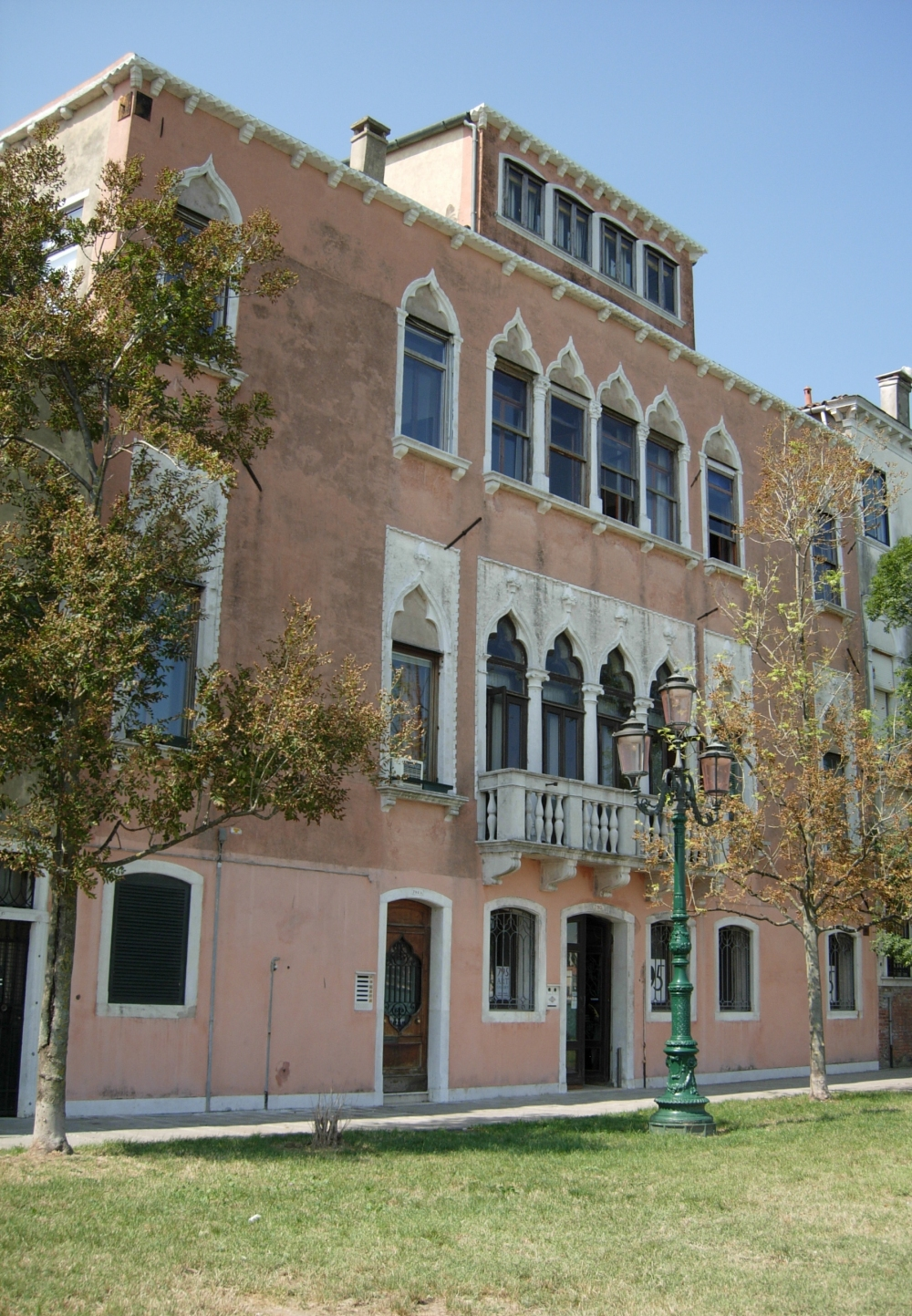
- Palazzo Foscari in Giudecca

- Location within Italy

General information
- Type: Palace
- Architectural style: Gothic Architecture
- Location: Venice, Veneto, Italy
- Coordinates: 45.4276°N 12.3219°E
- Current tenants: Giudecca 795 Art Gallery
- Estimated completion: 14th century

Website
- http://www.giudecca795.com/

Palazzo Foscari (also called Palazzetto Foscari) is a Gothic style palace in Venice, built in the 14th century; it is located at the civic number 795 in the island of Giudecca, near the Molino Stucky.

Originally one of the palaces built for the 65th doge of Venice Francesco Foscari and his family, in the late 19th century Palazzo Foscari in Giudecca was also inhabited by Giovanni Stucky, the Swiss engineer who completely renovated and enlarged the flour mills of Venice, applying modern manufacturing concepts and techniques (source: mosaic in the staircase, datation 1898). From 1992 to 2006, the palace hosted the Archivio musicale Luigi Nono, the musical archive of the Venetian composer. Since 2006, the palazzo has hosted a modern and contemporary art gallery, named after the address Giudecca 795.

== Bibliography ==
- Marcello Brusegan. La grande guida dei monumenti di Venezia. Roma, Newton & Compton, 2005
- Guida d'Italia - Venezia (third edition), Touring editore, Milan, 2007
- Venezia dall'Alto/Venice from Above, AWD Editore, Legnano, 2009
