= Lunar Hilton =

Proposed hotel on the moon

The Lunar Hilton is a proposed hotel on the Moon, which would be operated by the Hilton Hotels company. Rumours of the concept began with a space-themed event held by the company in Chicago in 1958 and the idea was adopted by Barron Hilton in the 1960s. A proposal was made for a 100-room underground hotel on the Moon's surface as well as a 24-room space station. The concept was promoted with reservation cards and mock room keys. The concept was revived in the 1990s with plans drawn up for a 5,000-room hotel and a space station constructed from recycled Space Shuttle fuel tanks. Commentators have speculated that the concept might be more of a public relations campaign than a real plan, though in 2022 the company became involved with the Starlab Space Station project.

== 1950s through 1970s ==
The first rumors of a Lunar Hilton began with an August 1958 event at the Conrad Hilton Hotel in Chicago. The event featured dancers performing a routine entitled "out of this world" and set in a Hilton hotel on the Moon. At the time the Space Race between the United States and the USSR had just begun: the event came less than a year after the launch of Sputnik 1 and predated the creation of NASA. The event led to reports in the contemporary press that Hilton Hotels were planning to construct a hotel on the Moon. It is not known if Conrad Hilton seriously adopted the idea but a March 1963 profile of him in Cosmopolitan noted "it won't be very long before our astronauts land on the Moon and immediately behind them will be Connie Hilton with his plans for his Lunar Hilton Hotel".

According to Mark Young, curator of the Conrad Hilton archive at the University of Houston, it was his son Barron Hilton who first acted on the idea of a Lunar Hilton. Barron was a keen aviator with piloting experience in planes, gliders, helicopters and hot air balloons and regularly met with astronauts. By 1967, when he was 39 years old and president of the company, he told the Wall Street Journal that he anticipated opening a hotel on the Moon within his lifetime. In the article he described a 100-room hotel below the Moon's surface with an observation dome holding a piano bar from which the Earth could be viewed.

On May 2 Barron Hilton spoke at the American Astronomical Society (AAS), telling them "scarcely a day goes by when someone doesn't ask me, jovially, when the Lunar Hilton is going to be opened. They're joking, of course – but I don't see it as a joke at all". He considered that the structure would be built 20–30 feet (6.1–9.1 m) underground to cope with the widely fluctuating surface temperatures. It would have had three floors; the lowest housing machinery, the middle providing accommodation and the upper public spaces. The accommodation was formed on two 400-foot (120 m) long corridors, connected by air locks, providing access to 100 rooms. The rooms were designed to be similar to those in Hilton Hotels on Earth and were to be "large with carpets, and drapes and plants ... [and] wall-to-wall television for programs from Earth and for views of outer space". There would also be an automated kitchen, powered by a nuclear reactor, and a cocktail lounge. The hotel would have an automatic leak repair system.

Lunar Hilton key and fob

During his speech Barron Hilton noted that a feasibility study had been made in conjunction with Donald Wills Douglas Sr., founder of the Douglas Aircraft Company. This had also considered a hotel orbiting the Earth, the Orbital Hilton, which was thought to be more achievable. This would have had 14 levels and be capable of hosting 24 people for short holidays or stopovers en route to the Moon. Barron Hilton told the AAS "I firmly believe that we are going to have hotels in outer space, perhaps even soon enough for me to officiate at the formal opening of the first".

To promote the concept Hilton printed reservation cards for customers and received hundreds of enquiries. The cards featured a depiction of a satellite above the Moon and asked the customer for their preference of a single or double room or a "cloud suite". The cards also offered the option of a transfer to the "intergalactic express". The reservation noted that arrival dates must be "after 1980". As well as the cards, mock keys to Lunar Hilton rooms were distributed to Hilton hotels as promotional items, these were traditional keys in a "sleek" style.

The Lunar Hilton concept was revived in 1969 as the first Moon landings took place. In 1973 Hilton partnered with Trans International Airlines (TIA) to produce a brochure inviting customers to a trip to the Moon "sometime after 1973". The brochure stated benefits of the trip included "a smogfree atmosphere, no rain or snow, no breath of wind and profound silence". A TIA spokesperson said costs could be up to $25,000 per person.

== 1990s revival ==
The concept was revived in the late 1990s. Hilton commissioned British architect Peter Inston to design a 5,000-room hotel on the Moon. The company's president, Peter George, said "One day soon, there will be hotels on the Moon. The Hilton wants to be the first". The company separately became lead sponsor of Space Islands, a planned space station constructed from recycled Space Shuttle fuel tanks and providing a 64-room hotel. Blueprints for the space station were drawn up by Japanese firm Shimzu. Bigelow Aerospace had plans to develop the CSS Skywalker, a space station based upon using B330 modules to act as an orbital hotel.

== Impact and future ==
Commentators have speculated that the Lunar Hilton concept was just a PR campaign rather than firm plans. Conrad Hilton's grandson Steven M. Hilton said, in 2009, the Lunar Hilton was meant to be symbolic of the company's ambitions rather than a firm plan. Hilton Hotels continues to participate in space projects. In October 2022 it joined the Starlab Space Station project as official hotel partner. The intent was that Hilton would assist with the design of the crew areas of Starlab. Previously Hilton became the first hotel company to participate in research on the International Space Station when their chocolate chip cookie became the first food to be baked in space.

The Lunar Hilton concept has had an influence on popular culture. A 1962 episode of The Jetsons, "The Good Little Scouts", briefly shows a Moonhattan Tilton, a reference to the Manhattan Hilton hotel, on the Moon. The 1968 film 2001: A Space Odyssey features a scene in the lounge of a Hilton space hotel and an office marked Hilton Space Station 5 is visible. A "Moon Hilton" is also featured in the 1969 film Moon Zero Two and its adaption into a novel by John Burke. An episode of the 2009 season of Mad Men, set in a 1960s advertising company, shows the character Don Draper creating a campaign for a Hilton hotel on the Moon.

== See also ==
- First Moon Flights Club – a program to pre-book commercial flights to the Moon
