= Hilton Cardiff =

Hotel in Cardiff, Wales

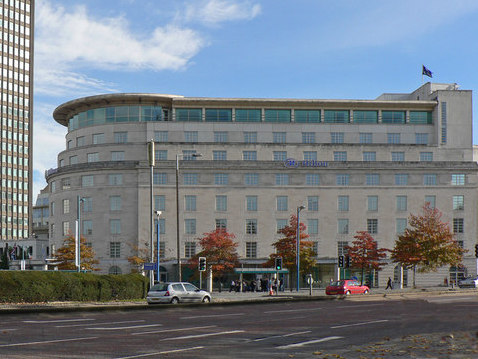
- The Portland stone side of the Hilton Hotel, Cardiff, topped by a glass atrium

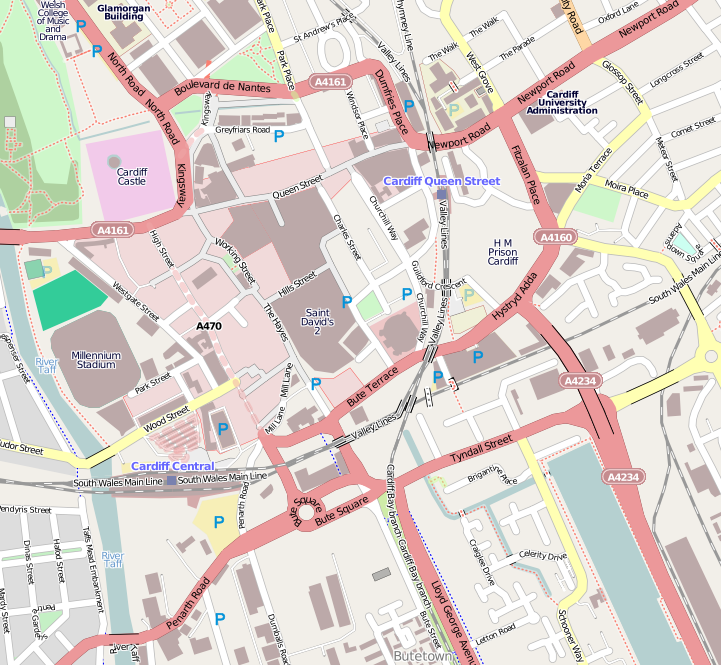
- Location within Central Cardiff

General information
- Location: Kingsway, Greyfriars Rd, Cardiff, Wales, United Kingdom
- Coordinates: 51°28′58″N 3°10′44″W
- Opening: Developed 1997-1999
- Management: Hilton Hotels & Resorts

Design and construction
- Architect: Powell Dobson

Other information
- Number of rooms: 202
- Number of restaurants: 1
- Parking: Parking £30.00 per night.

Website
- Official website

Hilton Cardiff is a hotel located in the centre of the City of Cardiff, capital of Wales. It is located just south of Cardiff City Hall, and overlooks Cardiff Castle.

== History and description ==
The original steel-framed structure was built in 1947 as the regional headquarters of the Prudential Assurance Company, faced in Portland stone. After the company moved to new premises in 1994, it was put up for sale, until the lease was purchased by Hilton Hotels in 1997.

Architects Powell Dobson designed the new hotel, much of the original stone façade of the original building was retained, providing 202 bedrooms topped by a two-storey extension which houses the Presidential Suite The external and internal focal point is provided by being topped-out by a glass roof atrium, providing the access to the then-largest ballroom in the city. The new hotel opened in 1999.

It was described in 2007 by one reviewer as the "glitziest hotel in Cardiff". Served by the Graze restaurant, as it is located close to the Principality Stadium, it has hosted some of the sports teams playing there, including the New Zealand All Blacks in 2007.
