= Hilton Podgorica Crna Gora =

Hotel in Podgorica, Montenegro

- Location within Montenegro
- Hotel chain: Hilton Hotels & Resorts

General information
- Type: Luxury Hotel
- Location: Bulevar Svetog Petra Cetinjskog 2, Podgorica, Montenegro
- Coordinates: 42.439071°N 19.263178°E
- Opened: 1953
- Renovated: soon will open (October 1, 2016)
- Owner: Hilton Worldwide

Other information
- Number of rooms: 180

Website
- Official website

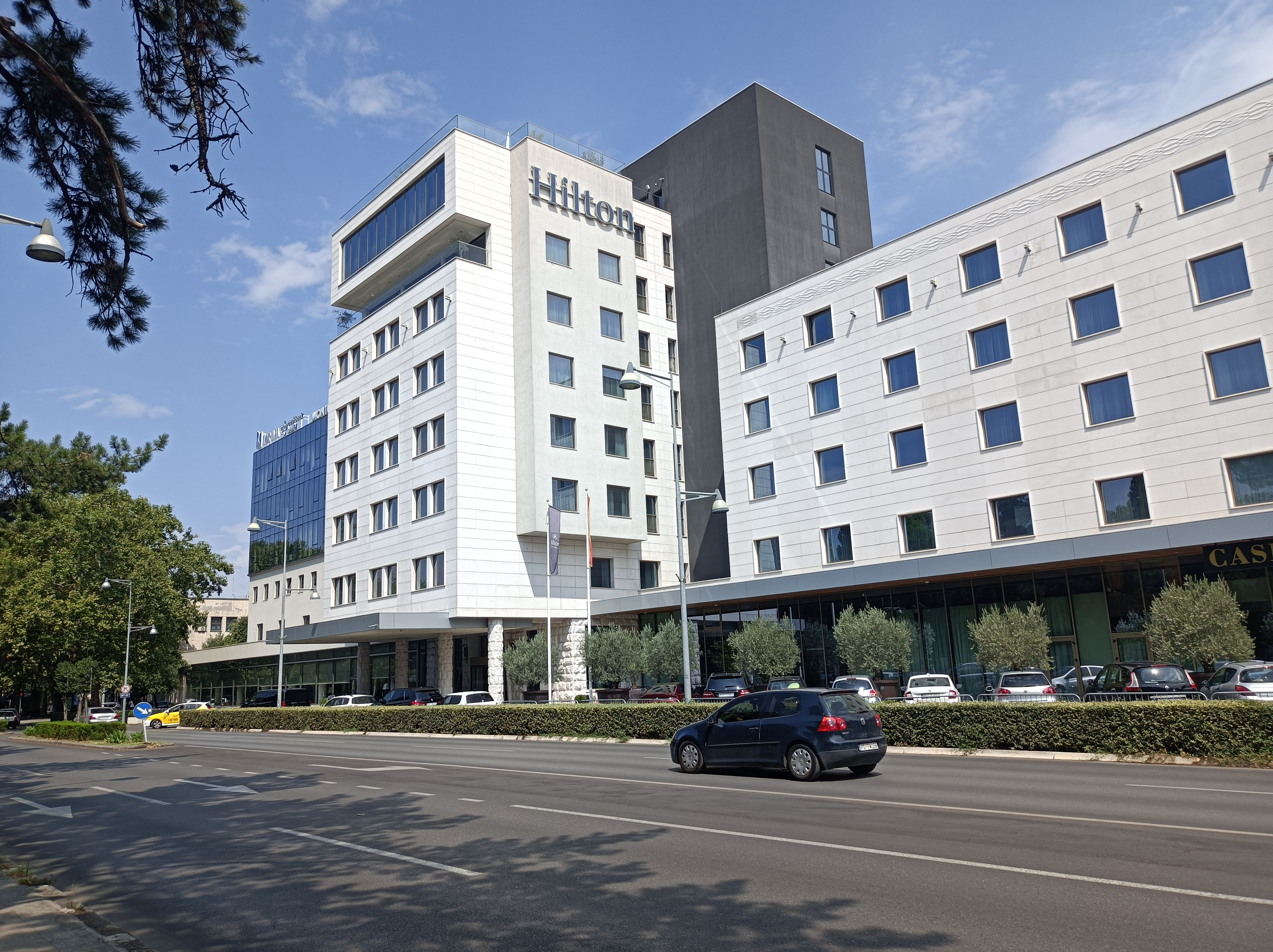

Hilton Podgorica Crna Gora was designed by Vujadin Popović and built in 1953 – that was once a symbol of post-war development and modern architecture. In 2011 it becomes clear that the hotel will be reconstructed by the worldwide company Hilton Hotels & Resorts. Hotel Hilton in Podgorica is recognized by the corporation as something characteristic of Montenegro and for the local people. The essence of the business policy of the Hilton brand when it opens a new hotel in some country is in its trying to understand the essence of the country and its people.

The corporation will make the efforts in its reconstructions to respect what seems to be the main feature of the existing building and the best in it.

== The hotel ==
The reconstructed hotel Crna Gora, now Hilton Podgorica Crna Gora, is a 5-star hotel, located in the city center, on the Boulevard Svetog Petra Cetinjskog, number 2, with about 420 employees.

The hotel contains: 180 double-bedrooms, 20 suits, congress center, restaurant, bar, SPA center, indoor swimming pool and underground garage. In addition to hotel capacity, as the project included were built a shopping mall and business center.
