= Barceló San Salvador Hotel =

Hotel in San Salvador, El Salvador

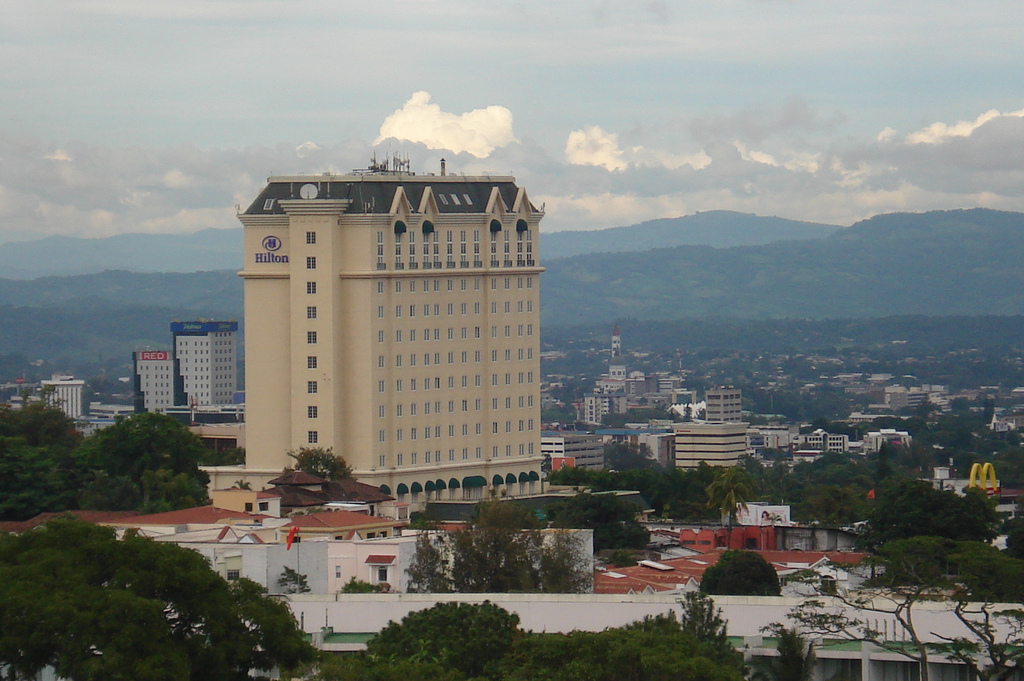
- Barceló San Salvador

- Location in El Salvador
- Hotel chain: Barceló Hotels and Resorts

General information
- Location: Ave las Magnolias y Blvd del Hipodromo, San Salvador, El Salvador
- Coordinates: 13°41′31.98″N 89°14′13.96″W
- Operator: Barceló Hotel Group

Height
- Height: 61 m (200 ft)

Technical details
- Floor count: 16

Design and construction
- Architect: Manuel Roberto Meléndez Bischitz

Other information
- Number of rooms: 205
- Number of restaurants: 2

Website
- https://www.barcelo.com/en-us/barcelo-san-salvador/

Barceló San Salvador is a hotel in San Salvador, El Salvador. Designed by Salvadoran architect Manuel Roberto Meléndez Bischitz, it is one of the tallest buildings in the country at 61 meters. The lobby has a marble floor and large paintings and the rooms are said to have thick carpets with heavy wood armoires.

Opened in 1997, originally as the Hilton Princess San Salvador Hotel, it contains 205 rooms spanning 13 levels. The hotel offers 3 types of rooms: the king, double, and suite rooms. Two restaurants offer a variety of dishes. A bar on the property serves various alcoholic beverages.

Located in San Salvador's San Benito district, each room has a distinct view of the San Salvador volcano. Many restaurants and malls are in its vicinity.
