= Hilton Barcelona =

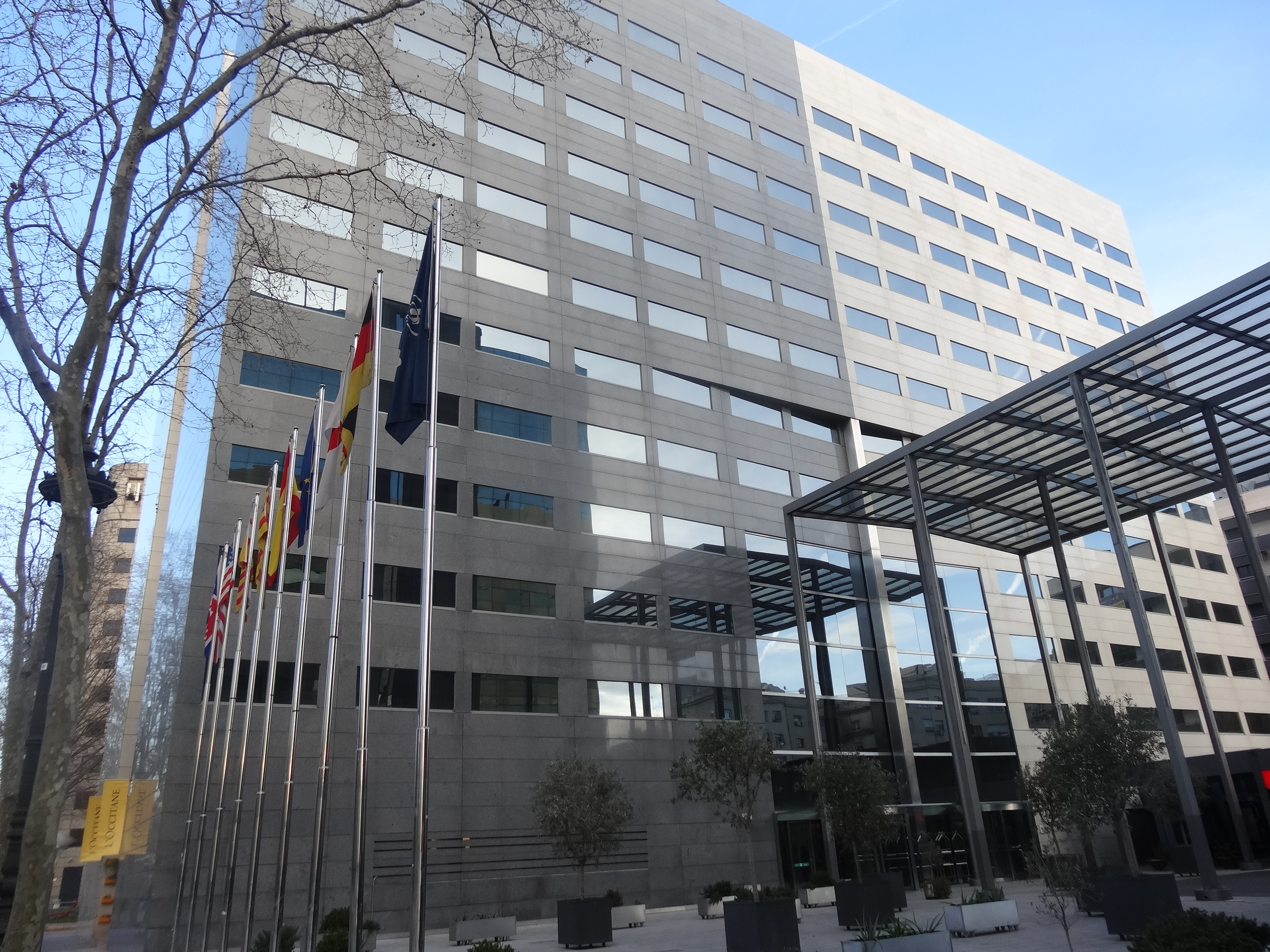
- Hilton Barcelona
- Hotel chain: Hilton Hotels & Resorts

General information
- Type: Hotel
- Classification: 4 stars
- Location: Avinguda Diagonal, 589-591, Barcelona, Spain
- Coordinates: 41.388614°N 2.131245°E
- Opened: March, 1990
- Renovated: 2012
- Owner: Oman Investment Fund
- Operator: Hilton Hotels

Height
- Height: 45.00 m (147.64 ft)

Technical details
- Floor count: 14

Other information
- Number of rooms: 290
- Number of suites: 14
- Number of restaurants: 1
- Number of bars: 1
- Parking: Yes

Website
- Official website

Hilton Barcelona is the first Hilton hotel in Spain. The hotel is located at the Barcelona's main avenue, Avenida Diagonal.

== History ==
In the early 70's the mayor of Barcelona was Josep Maria de Porcioles, a clever politician who took full advantage of the construction fever of developmentalism. During his long term (1957 - 1973) he undertook urban projects destined to transform Barcelona into a city that could host a new Universal Exhibition like the one that in 1929 had radically changed the city. Porcioles believed that for his projects, the city needed more luxury hotels, so he granted a license to the Hilton hotel chain to build a large and modern skyscraper in the heart of the Diagonal. The problem was that the concession was illegal, since it exceeded by 40% the limits indicated by the law for volumetric and building heights.

The courts ordered Hilton to demolish the excess of the building that was illegal, which meant cutting half a skyscraper and compensating the city with a millionaire amount. The Hilton didn’t do it, and the litigation lasted years, until the Democracy (1980), when an agreement was reached that saved the building.

A private company bought the building and converted it for sanitary uses, the courts accepted the exchange and the Hilton became the Barcelona Hospital. Instead of suites, they had to put in operating rooms, the luxurious halls were replaced by waiting rooms, waiters replaced by nurses and guests by patients.

A few years later, Hilton managed, legally to build another hotel, located just across the road, where the current Hospital was planned.

Finally, in 1990, before Barcelona Olympics, Hilton Barcelona opened as an 11-storey building.

== Building ==
Nowadays the hotel has 290 rooms, including 14 suites, it is 45.00m in height and includes 14 floors above ground and 5 more below. Hilton Barcelona has been renovated in 2012 with an investment of 23 million euros and the designer of the renovation in the lobby was the Italian architect and designer Matteo Thun.
