= Hilton Hotel Tallinn Park =

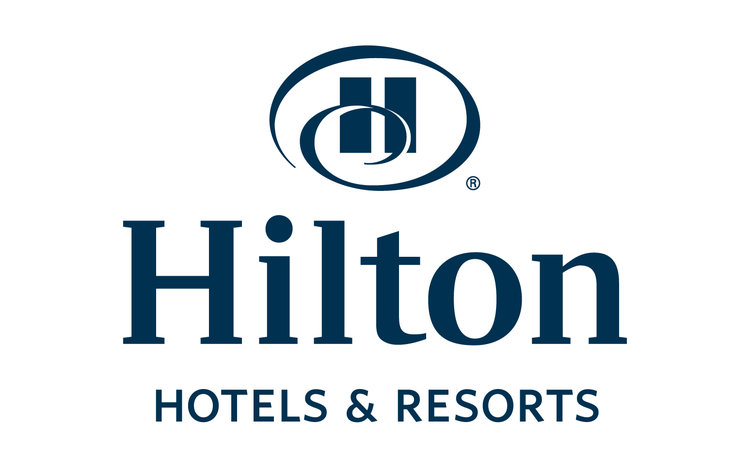
- Official logo for the Hilton hotel brand

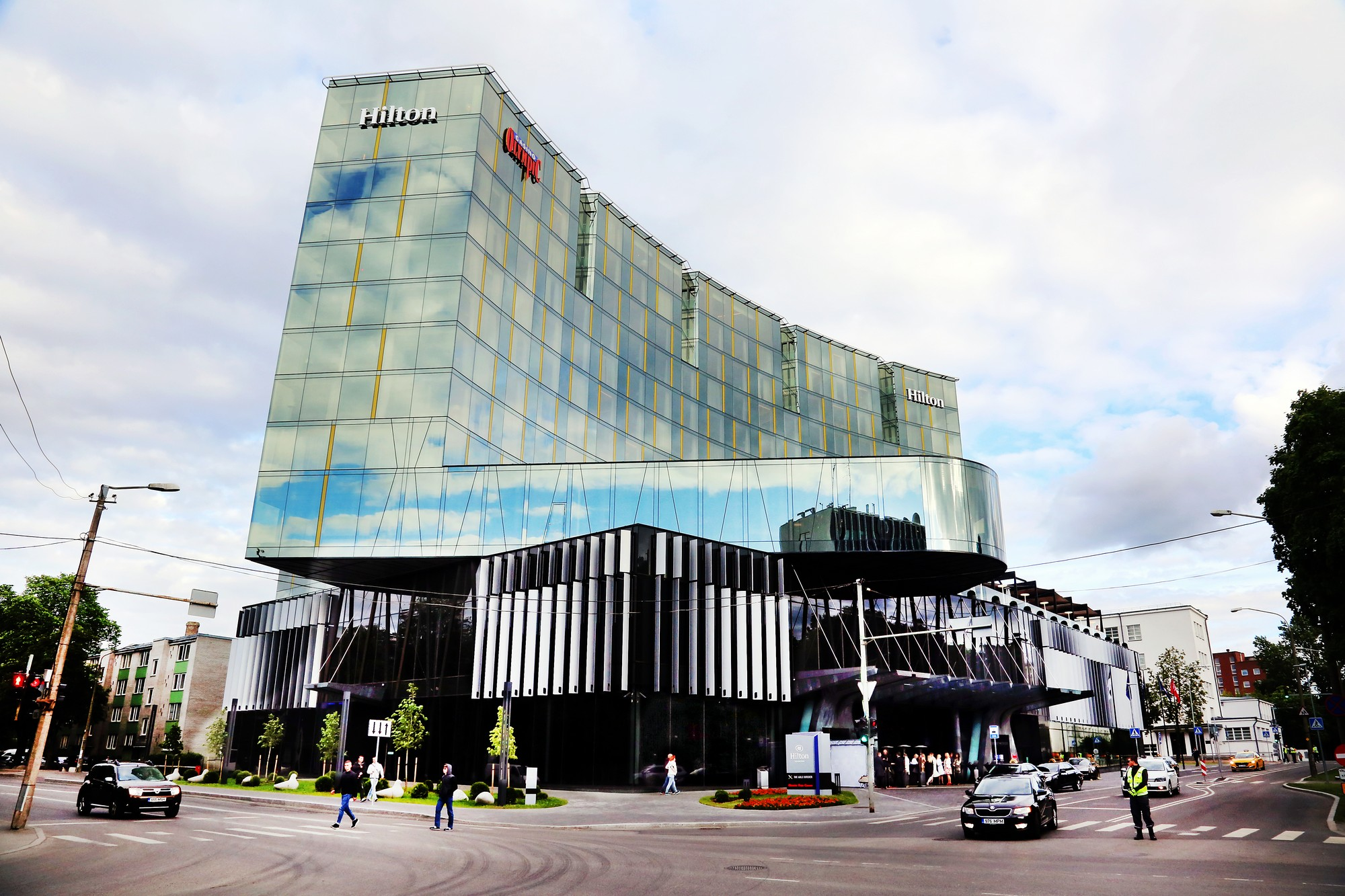
- The exterior of the Hilton Hotel Tallinn Park

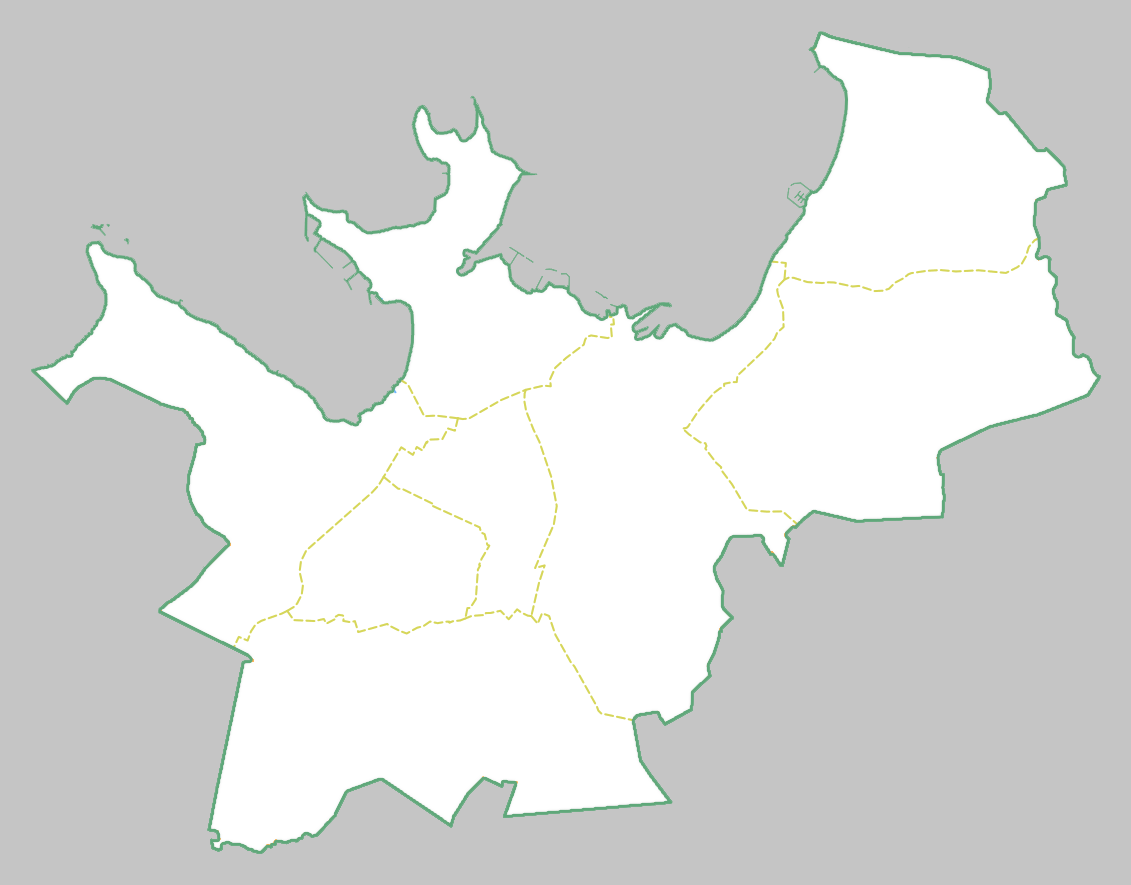
- Location within Tallinn

General information
- Status: Completed
- Type: Hotel
- Architectural style: Modern
- Location: F. R. Kreutzwaldi, 23, Kesklinn, Tallinn, Estonia
- Coordinates: 59.4337363°N 24.7689341°E
- Opened: 1 June 2016
- Client: Hilton company

Design and construction
- Architect: Meelis Press
- Developer: East Capital Baltic Property Fund III

Other information
- Number of suites: 27
- Facilities: Casino

Website
- https://www.hilton.com/en/hotels/tllhihi-hilton-tallinn-park/

Hilton Tallinn Park is a hotel within the Kesklinn neighborhood in Tallinn, Estonia. It is on the corner of Kreutzwald, Gonsiori and J. Kunder streets in Tallinn. In front of the hotel, on the other side of the road, is the Police Park (Politseiaed). It was the Hilton brand's first hotel in the Baltic states.

== Overview ==
The hotel is part of the Hilton Hotels & Resorts owned by Hilton Worldwide. The property is owned by the East Capital Baltic Property Fund III and managed by East Capital. Shortly after public operation began, East Capital Baltic Property Fund III completed an agreement in July 2016 to purchase the newly finished facility from the developer, Olympic Entertainment Group, for 48 million euros.

== Design ==
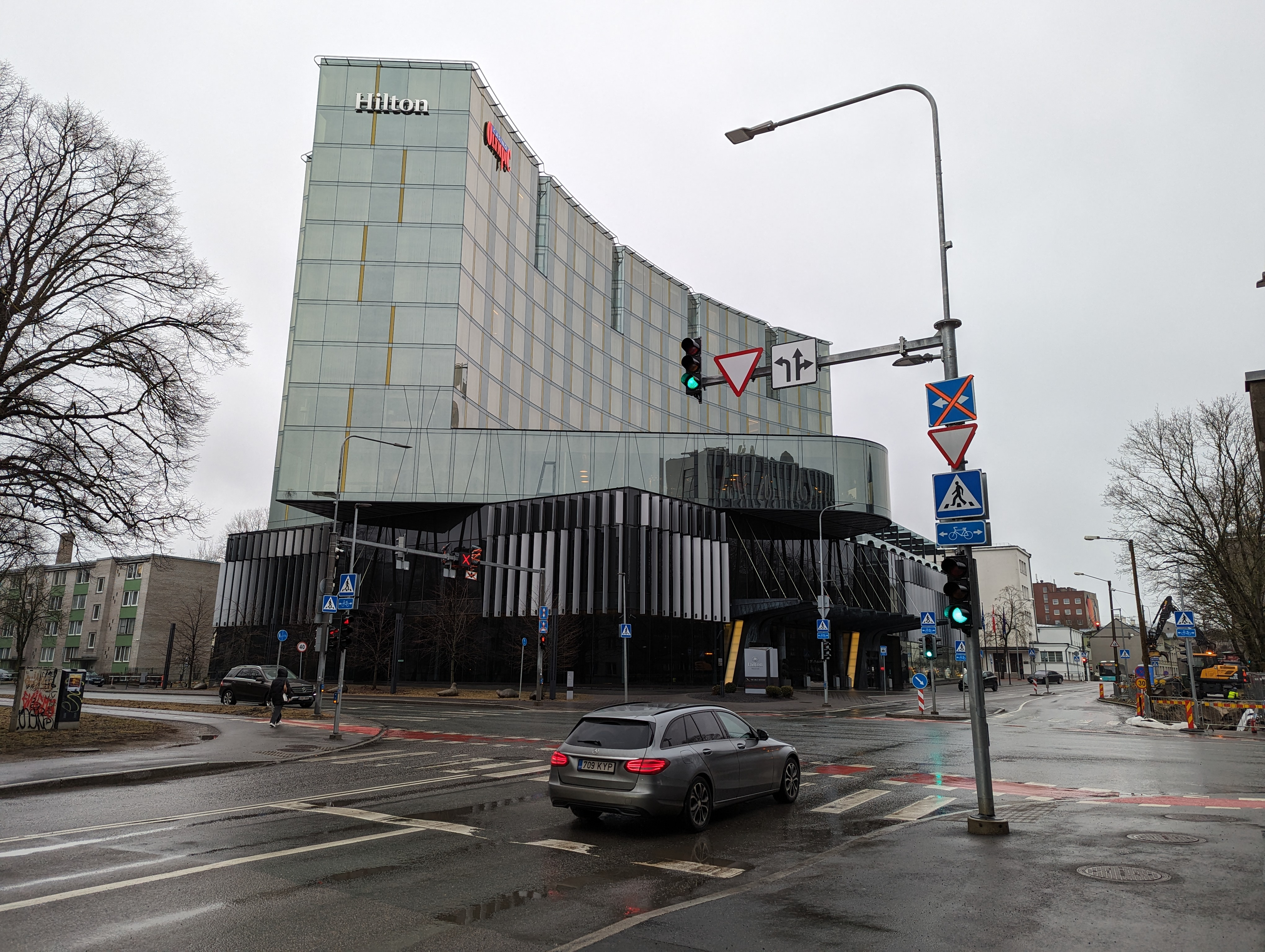
Corner of Kreutzwaldi and Gonsiori streets in Tallinn

The building was designed by Meelis Press. The hotel interior was designed by Vertti Kivi. The hotel opened its doors on 1 June 2016.

As the Hilton brand's first establishment inside the Baltic states, the design focused on establishing an identity that included concepts like "cosiness" and "friendliness". Guest rooms were built with floor-to-ceiling windows to maximize natural lighting.

== Layout ==
The building's layout has a distinctive split. There is a lower public podium housing the lobby area and amenities, which is separated from the upper nine-story block containing the guest suites. Business and event facilities are housed within the public lobby area and consists of ten flexible meeting rooms, a 24-hour business centre, an Executive Lounge, and a central ballroom that accommodates up to 530 guests, giving the entire conference space a maximum capacity of 800 attendees.

Additional amenities located on the property include a fitness centre, an indoor swimming pool, a spa, an outdoor terrace with a barbecue area, a lobby café, and a signature steakhouse restaurant named The Able Butcher. The property also contains the Olympic Park Casino, on the first floor of the venue. The Casino totals 1600 square metres making it, at the time of construction, the largest Olympic casino in Estonia. The building features 202 guest rooms, including 27 suites with views of Tallinn's Old Town and the local harbour.

== Performance and recognition ==
Market reporting in 2017 suggested that the opening of the Hilton Hotel Tallinn Park in mid-2016 might have contributed to positive shifts across the local hospitality sector, with industry data showing a 5.4% increase in Tallinn's Revenue Per Available Room Year-to-Date (Note: Revenue Per Available Room Year-to-Date (RevPAR YTD) is a performance metric used in the hospitality sector to evaluate a hotel property's performance during the calendar year. It combines two measures, room occupancy and average daily rate (ADR), to show how well a hotel fills its available inventory.) by September of that year.

In 2024, the Estonia Vocational School's Employer Image Survey reported that the hotel was among the most attractive employers for those leaving vocational schools in Estonia. The survey is an annual workplace reputation study that gathered feedback from roughly 6,000 individuals and has been running since 2009. The participants included students in trade schools and people currently employed. The survey participants then scored various businesses while being showed rival companies next to each other. During the study, participants were asked to review employers across different industries. The hotel ranked in the top ten of a total of 263 employers and was tenth overall in the list which included the Estonian Police and Border Guard.

== See also ==
- Hilton Helsinki Kalastajatorppa - Another hotel in the region which was originally a 1910s fisherman's croft
- Hilton Hotels & Resorts - List of Hilton Hotels around the world
- Media related to Hilton Tallinn Park at Wikimedia Commons
