= Hilton Orlando Buena Vista Palace =

Hotel at Walt Disney World

Coordinates: 28°22′35″N 81°30′53″W

Hilton Orlando Lake Buena Vista
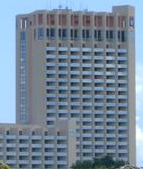
- Hotel chain: Hilton Hotels & Resorts

General information
- Location: Walt Disney World, 1900 East Buena Vista Drive; Lake Buena Vista, Florida; United States
- Opening: March 10, 1983
- Owner: Hilton Worldwide

Other information
- Number of rooms: 1,011

Website
- www.buenavistapalace.com

The Hilton Orlando Buena Vista Palace is a 1,011-room resort at the Walt Disney World Resort in Lake Buena Vista, Florida, United States. It is located on 27 acres (11 ha) directly across from Disney Springs. The 23-acre (9.3 ha) hotel, which opened on March 10, 1983, is among the ten resorts that make up the Disney Springs Resort Area. It is one of seven resorts in the Disney Springs Resort Area not owned or operated by Disney. The hotel is connected to Disney Springs by pedestrian skybridges, as well as a shuttle service to all the Disney Parks.

== History ==
The Buena Vista Palace Resort & Spa was rebranded and renamed as the Wyndham Palace Resort & Spa in November 1998 (the hotel's owners, who had acquired the hotel a year earlier, had purchased Wyndham earlier in the year). In 2005, the Blackstone Group acquired Wyndham International and announced plans to launch a new brand LXR Luxury Resorts. LXR Luxury Resorts would consist of 21 premium properties wholly owned by the Blackstone Group, including the former Wyndham Palace which reverted to its original name in 2006. The hotel was sold to the Hilton Corporation in 2015, and has since been renamed as the "Hilton Orlando Buena Vista Palace".

In the late 80s, the Buena Vista Palace was also used as a Grand Prize in the Nickelodeon Game Shows, Double Dare And Think Fast.

In 2015, the Hilton Corporation acquired the hotel. With the acquisition, a multi-million-dollar renovation of the entire hotel commenced.
