= First Moon Flights Club =

Marketing campaign of American airline Pan Am

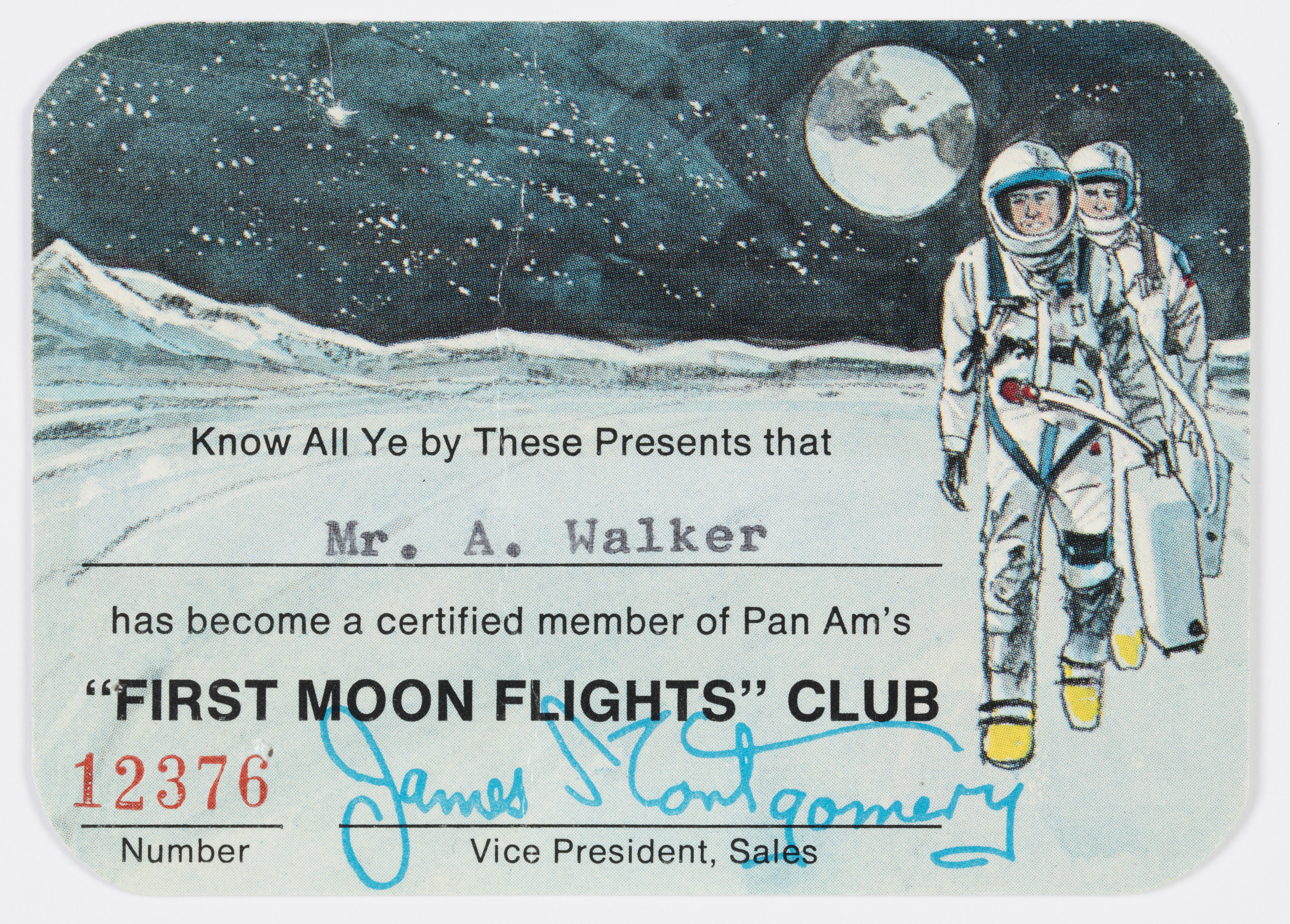
A First Moon Flights Club membership card

The First Moon Flights Club was a marketing campaign of American airline Pan Am that ran between 1968 and 1971. Self-described as a space tourism program, it was essentially a "waiting list" of people interested in taking commercial flights to the Moon. While some considered it to be a tongue-in-cheek campaign, Pan Am publicly insisted that the program was legitimate.

== Origins ==
According to popular legend, the program was conceived in 1964, when Austrian journalist Gerhart Pistor demanded a flight to the Moon at a Vienna travel agency. The travel agency accepted his deposit of 500 Austrian shilling, and forwarded his request to Pan Am and Aeroflot. At Pan Am, the request was eventually forwarded to founder Juan Trippe, who saw an opportunity in capitalizing on the obsession with human spaceflight. Pistor's reservation was accepted two weeks later, and was told that the first flight was expected to depart in 2000.

== Operation ==
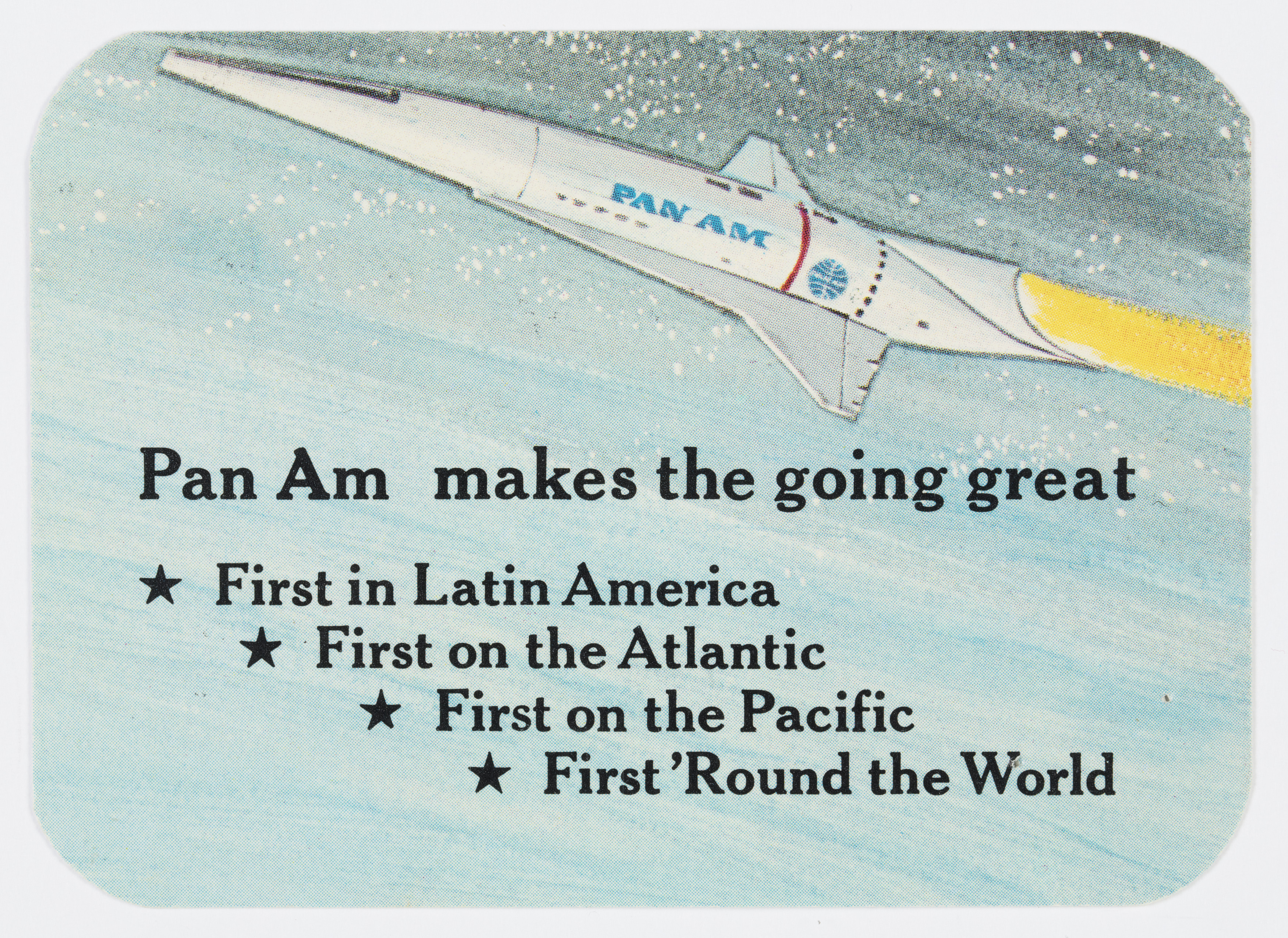
The back of the membership card, featuring the fictional "Space Clipper" from 2001: A Space Odyssey

The program was established in 1968, and no deposits were required for reservations. Reservations did not include the fare, which Pan Am said was "not fully resolved, and may be out of this world."

At the beginning of its operation, the program received only a small flow of requests. The popularity of the program was bolstered when the science fiction film 2001: A Space Odyssey was released in 1968. The movie, featuring a fictional Pan Am "Space Clipper", led some audiences to believe Pan Am's program was legitimate. The first major surge of sales occurred after the successful Apollo 8 flight in 1968. Trippe phoned ABC to make it known that the airline was keeping a list of people interested in a commercial flight to the Moon. After the publicity stunt, the company received "a flurry of requests". The program was also promoted on radio and TV spots. By July 20, 1969, during the lunar landing of Apollo 11, Pan Am's program had 25,000 reservation requests. The successful Moon landing further increased sales.

Reservers were given a membership card issued at no cost. The cards were signed by Pan Am's vice president for sales, James Montgomery, and the "Space Clipper" was featured on the back of the card. A serial number was printed on the card, which reflected the reserver's position on the waiting list. 100,000 cards were printed in total.

The success of the program attracted competitor Trans World Airlines to maintain a similar waiting list, who ended their program after receiving around 6,000 names and public interest had waned.

Its waiting list was closed on March 3, 1971, when the program became an administrative burden during an era of financial troubles at the airline. By then, the list had 93,000 names from 90 countries, and included many public figures such as Ronald Reagan, Barry Goldwater, Walter Cronkite and George Shapiro. As late as 1989, Pan Am maintained that the program was legitimate, and that the memberships would eventually be redeemed. A Pan Am spokeswoman called the program "a little off-scheduled", but promised that they were "keeping the list in an archive and will pull it out when—note that I didn't say if—the airline starts regular service." The airline declared bankruptcy in 1991, formally ending the program.
