= Gregg Hotel =

Hotel in Texas

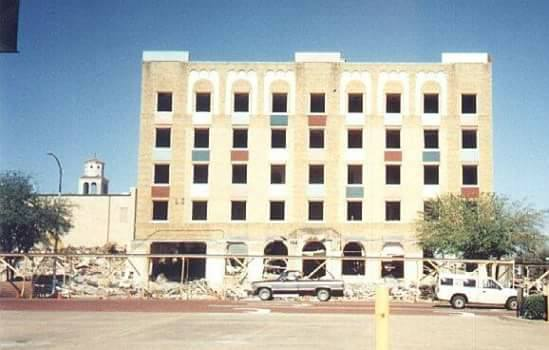
- Taken by Jimmy Ramsey

- Location within Texas
- Former names: *Hotel Gregg; *Hilton Hotel; *Hotel Longview; *Downtowner Motor Inn; *LeToureanu College Residence Hall
- Alternative names: Downtowner Hotel

General information
- Status: Demolished
- Type: Hotel
- Location: 215 E. Methvin St. Longview, Texas; United States
- Coordinates: 32.493438°N 94.729146°W
- Construction started: 1928
- Completed: 1930
- Demolished: 1995

Technical details
- Floor count: 5
- Lifts/elevators: 1

Design and construction
- Architect: Edward F. Neild (1936 Annex)

Other information
- Number of rooms: 1929–1936: 64 1936–1978: 128

Gregg Hotel is a former hotel in Longview, Texas, built in 1930 and demolished in 1995.

== 1930–1936 Hotel Gregg ==
Brick laying on the new Hotel Gregg began in early November, 1929.

When the Hotel Gregg officially opened, the Longview Daily News called the event "one of the most auspicious occasions in the history of the city." Guest from all over East Texas including Shreveport, Louisiana attended.

In late spring of 1931, due to the oil boom, hotel occupancy was over 100%. The dining room was converted to guest quarters with temporary partitions between the beds to handle the number of guests.

On March 29, 1934, nearby Hotel Longview caught fire and burned to the ground with a loss of three lives. This left Longview with a shortage of hotel rooms which prompted a proposal to enlarge the Gregg Hotel.

== 1936–1947 Hilton Hotel ==
In 1935 Conrad Hilton purchased the Gregg Hotel. He started immediate plans to enlarge the hotel making the existing Gregg Hotel the annex to a much larger new hotel building. Construction started in March, 1936 for the new addition.

On August 14, 1936, the expanded hotel was opened with construction ongoing. It was at this time the name of the Gregg Hotel was changed to Hilton Hotel.

== 1947–1964 Hotel Longview ==
In mid-1947 Tom Young and Associates purchased the building from Conrad Hilton and renamed the facility "Hotel Longview".

In June, 1954, Earl Hollandsworth and Lee Travis bought the hotel. In addition to the Longview building they also owned the Carlton Hotel in Tyler and Hotel Marshall in Marshall.

== 1964–1978 Downtowner Motor Inn ==
On May 14, 1964, the new Downtowner Motor Inn sign was erected. A new addition along the front of the hotel was constructed to add new meeting rooms and a location to house Jackson Travel Agency. The official opening date of the newly renovated Downtowner Motor Inn was June 1, 1964.

In 1974, the hotel building was given to LeTourneau College (now LeTourneau University) by Mr. and Mrs. Earl Hollandsworth. The college continued commercial operations of the hotel and dining room. Due to an increase in enrollment in the fall of 1977 and a lack of living space on campus, the college housed approximately 40 men on the third floor of the hotel. On May 15, 1978, permanent guests and staff of the Downtowner Motor Inn were notified the hotel would cease commercial operations on July 15, 1978. The college planned to have the hotel converted to a dormitory and ready to house 180 men in the fall of 1978.

== 1978–1984 LeTourneau College Residence Hall ==
Beginning with the 1978 autumn semester at LeTourneau College (Now University), the former Downtowner Motor Inn building was converted completely to a dormitory and renamed LeTourneau College Residence Hall. It housed men who attended LeTourneau College. Shuttle buses were provided throughout the day to transport them between the downtown dorm and the campus located on South Mobberly Ave.

Due to new dormitories constructed on campus the Residence Hall was closed and put up for sale following the 1984 spring semester signalling the end of an era.

== 1984–1995 Vacant and demolition ==
After graduation the men moved out and the hotel building was shuttered, except for one tenant, the Hilton Barbershop. The barbershop continued for another two years as the sole tenant in the vacant hotel building. It finally closed its doors on July 19, 1986.

The old Downtowner was demolished in 1995.

== List of owners and operators ==
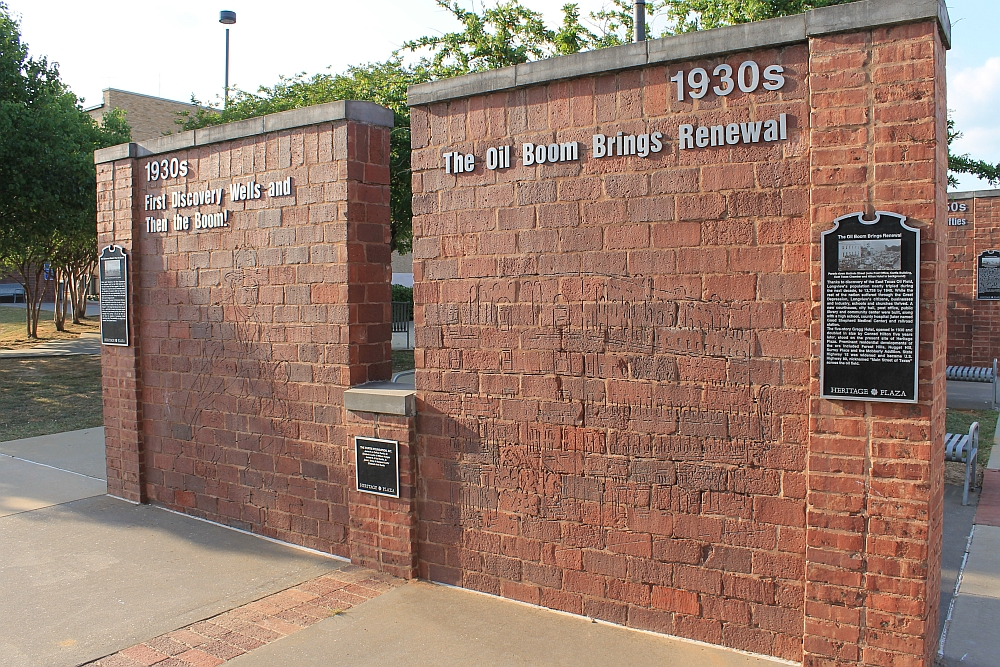
The site is now Heritage Plaza, a city park.

- 1930–1931 Owner: Longview Hotel Company
- 1929–1931 Operator: North Louisiana Hotel Company (dba Gregg Hotel)
- 1931–1935 Owner: Gregg Hotel Company (dba Gregg Hotel)
- 1935–1947 Owner and operator: Conrad Hilton, Hilton Hotel Company (dba Gregg Hotel, Hilton Hotel)
- 1947–1954 Owner: Tom Young and Associates (dba Hotel Longview)
- 1954–1974 Owner: Earl Hollandsworth and Lee Travis (dba Hotel Longview, Downtowner Motor Inn)
- 1974–2000 Owner: LeTourneau University (dba Downtowner Motor Inn, LeTourneau College Residence Hall)
- 2000–present Owner: City of Longview (dba Heritage Plaza)
