= Hotel Carlton Madagascar =

Coordinates: 18°54′52″S 47°31′3″E

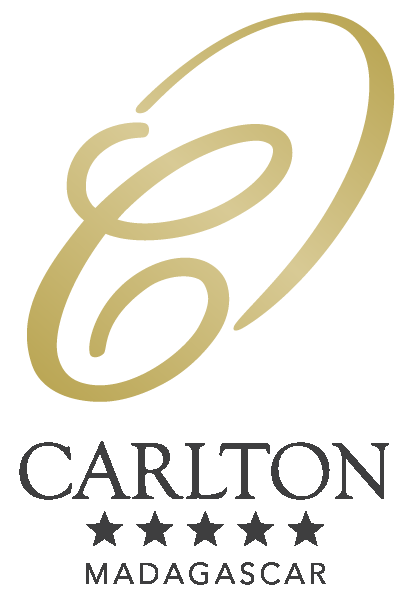
- Interactive map of the Hotel Carlton Madagascar area

General information
- Type: hotel
- Location: Antananarivo, Madagascar

The Hotel Carlton Madagascar is a hotel in Antananarivo, Madagascar. It was built in 1970 as the Madagascar Hilton and operated under that name until 2007. The hotel has 171 rooms including 6 suites and overlooks Lake Anosy. It is described as one of the few high-rise buildings in the city and the only "truly high-rise building" in Antananarivo. In 2001 it was reported that the hotel was the centre for Madagascar Airtours.

Irish author Dervla Murphy visited the hotel in 1983 to obtain money via traveller's cheque, noting: "Tana's Hilton looks like a Hilton and is by far the tallest building in Madagascar. But that afternoon its vast foyer was empty and its reception desk unmanned. Wandering down long silent corridors of standardised affluence, we saw no other vazaha (foreigners). At intervals gorgeously uniformed servants emerged smiling from alcoves and niches; clearly we were not Hilton material, yet their welcoming handshakes were as genuine as the surrounding glamour was phoney."
