= Hôtel Pullman Paris Tour Eiffel =

Hotel in Paris

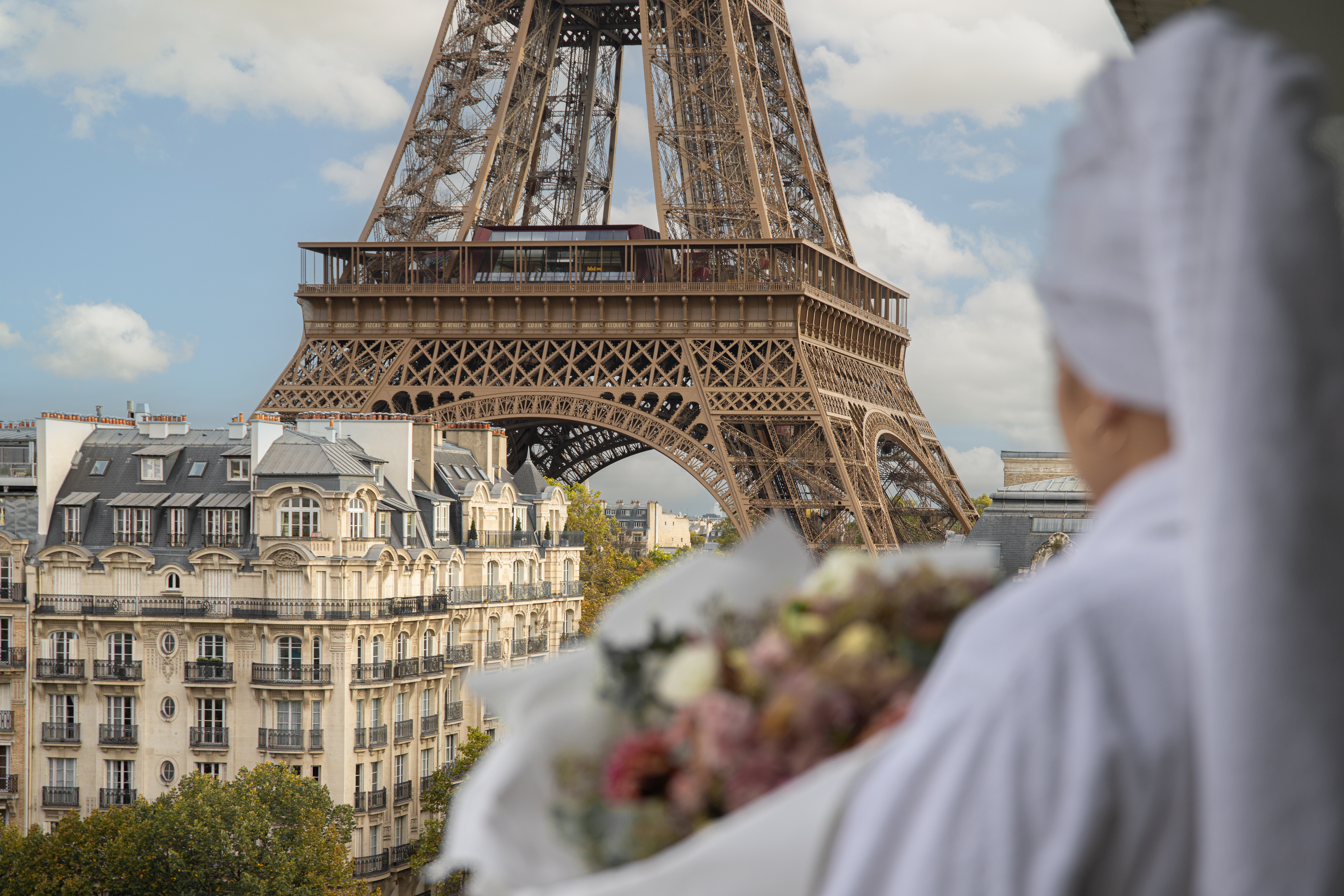
- Interactive map of the Hôtel Pullman Paris Tour Eiffel area

General information
- Type: Hotel
- Location: Paris 15th arrondissement
- Coordinates: 48°51′19″N 2°17′34″E
- Construction started: 1966
- Opening: April 21, 1966
- Owner: Batipart Europe, CDC Investissement immobilier, Société Générales Assurances et QuinSpark
- Operator: AccorHotels

Height
- Antenna spire: 38.82 m (127.4 ft)

Technical details
- Floor count: 11

Design and construction
- Architect: Pierre Dufau

Pullman Paris Tour Eiffel

The Pullman Paris Tour Eiffel is a four-star hotel located in Paris’s 15th district, near the Eiffel Tower and the Champ de Mars. Opened in 1966 as the Paris Hilton, the building was designed by French architect Pierre Dufau and has operated under the Pullman brand since 2009. It is one of the closest hotels to the Eiffel Tower.

Its location and architecture give a number of rooms and upper-floor spaces direct views of the Eiffel Tower and the surrounding Paris skyline.

History

The hotel opened in April 1966 as part of the development of international hotel chains in Paris during the second half of the 20th century. At the time, it introduced standards associated with modern international hospitality.

In 2009, the property became the Pullman Paris Tour Eiffel. A major renovation followed in the early 2010s, with interior design work led by French designer Christophe Pillet.

Architecture and location

Designed by Pierre Dufau, the building reflects the modernist architecture of the 1960s. It stands between Avenue de Suffren and Rue Jean-Rey, a short distance from the Eiffel Tower.

This unusual proximity creates a strong visual relationship between the hotel and one of Paris’s best-known landmarks, making the building a distinctive part of the contemporary architectural landscape around the Champ de Mars.

Hotel facilities

The hotel comprises 430 rooms and suites across 11 floors. Several room categories have balconies and views towards the Eiffel Tower, the Trocadéro or the hotel gardens.

The hotel’s restaurant, FRAME, is located on the ground floor and includes a bar, a terrace and an interior garden.

The property also includes 24 meeting and event spaces covering approximately 2,200 square metres. These range from meeting rooms and reception spaces to upper-floor venues overlooking the Eiffel Tower and the Paris skyline.

Cultural references

Since its opening, the hotel has hosted public figures from the worlds of music, cinema, fashion and sport. The hotel has notably associated its history with guests including Serge Gainsbourg, Elizabeth Taylor, Karl Lagerfeld and Usain Bolt.

Its proximity to the Eiffel Tower, large reception rooms and views over Paris have also made the property a location for film shoots, television productions and fashion events.

These connections with cinema, fashion and international travel form part of the hotel’s identity, which has evolved from the American-inspired modernism of the 1960s to its current position within contemporary Parisian hospitality.

== See also ==
- Skyscraper
- List of tallest structures in Paris
