= Hilton Paris Opéra =

Hilton-branded hotel in Paris

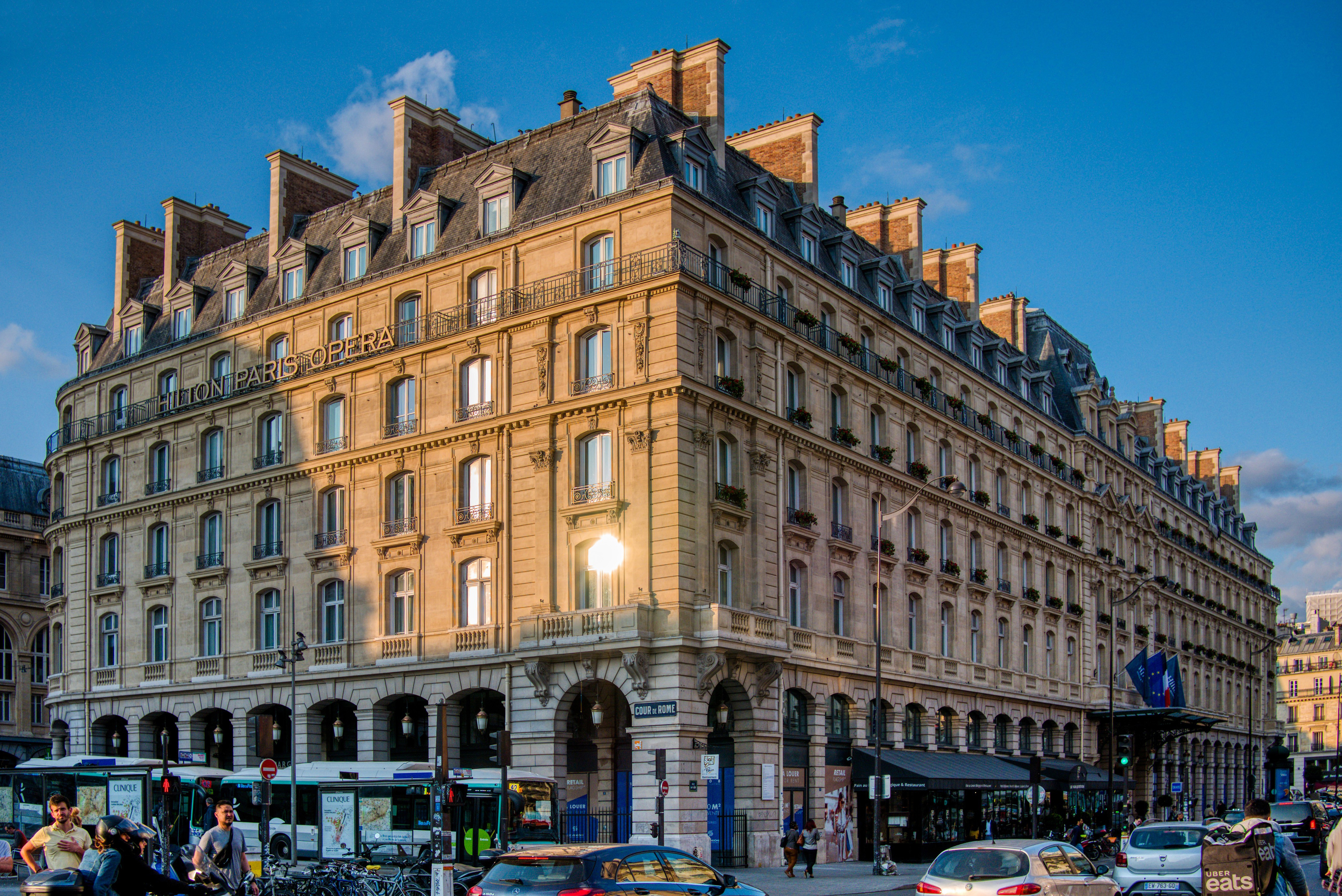
- Hilton Paris Opéra

- Location within Paris

General information
- Location: Paris, France, 108 Rue Saint-Lazare
- Coordinates: 48.8754°N 2.3256°E
- Opening: 7 May 1889
- Owner: Hilton Hotels Corporation

Technical details
- Floor count: 6

Design and construction
- Architect: Juste Lisch

Other information
- Number of rooms: 268
- Number of suites: 29

Website
- www.hilton.com/en/hotels/parophi-hilton-paris-opera/o

Monument historique

The Hilton Paris Opéra is a historic hotel in the 8th arrondissement of Paris, France.

== History ==
The Grand Hotel Terminus opened on May 7, 1889, constructed to house the crowds of international tourists visiting Paris for the 1889 World's Fair in Paris, the event for which the Eiffel Tower was also built. It was built by French architect Juste Lisch and originally designed to accommodate transatlantic travelers arriving from Normandy by train. The hotel later became the Grand Hotel Terminus Saint-Lazare. In 1972, it was bought by Concorde Hotels and Resorts and renamed the Hotel Concorde Saint-Lazare Paris and then the Hotel Concorde Opéra Paris in 2009.

The hotel was purchased by Hilton in 2013, underwent a restoration costing over $50 million, and was reopened in 2015 as the Hilton Paris Opéra.

== Facilities ==
The hotel features 268 guest rooms and is considered significant for its Belle Époque style architecture, with high ceilings and ornate decor. It was added to the Historic Hotels of America Historic Hotels Worldwide list in 2018, and in 2023 made the list of the top 25 Historic Hotels Worldwide Most Magnificent Ceilings and Domes.
