= Molino Stucky =

Building in Venice

Coordinates: 45.4282°N 12.3201°E

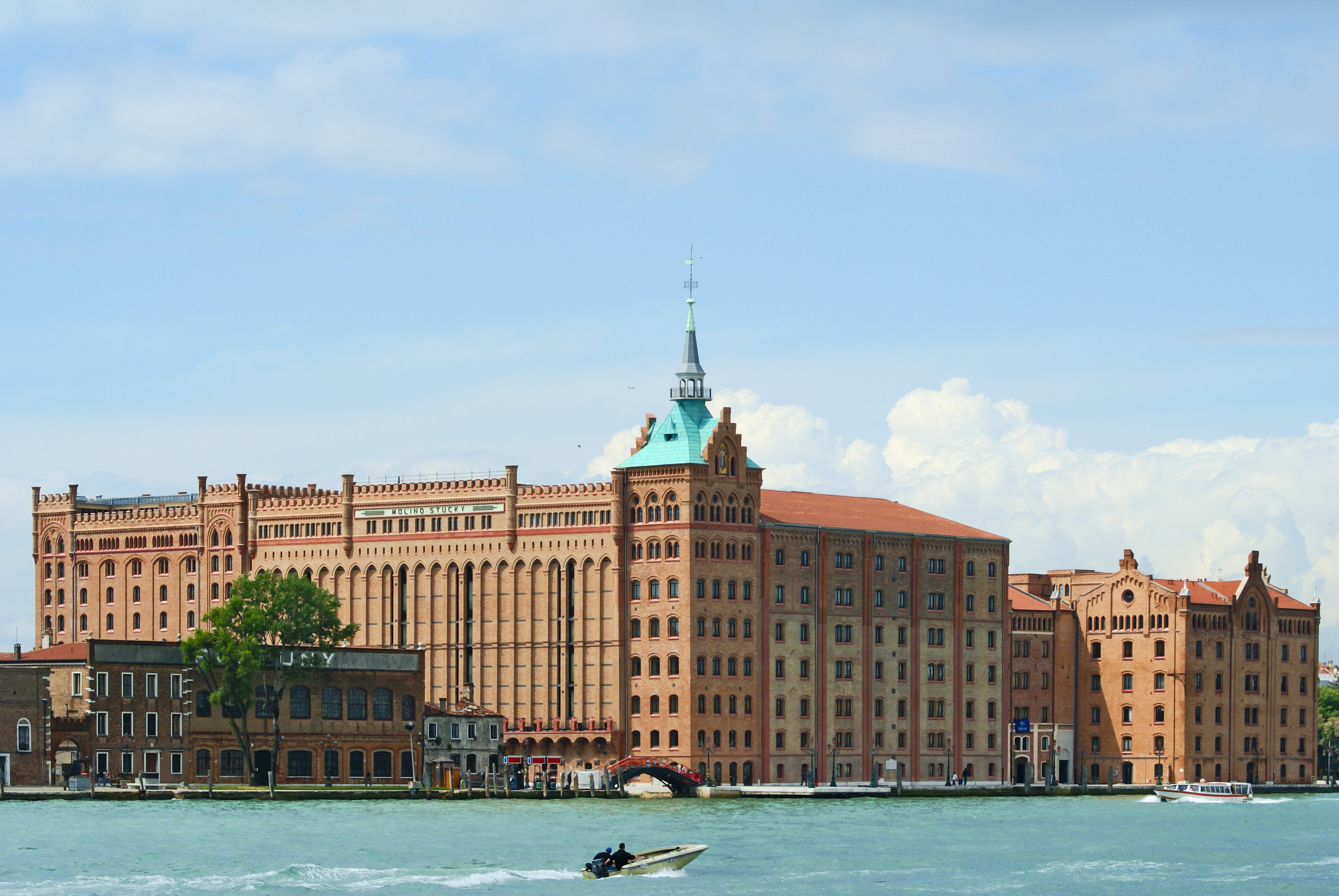
Molino Stucky

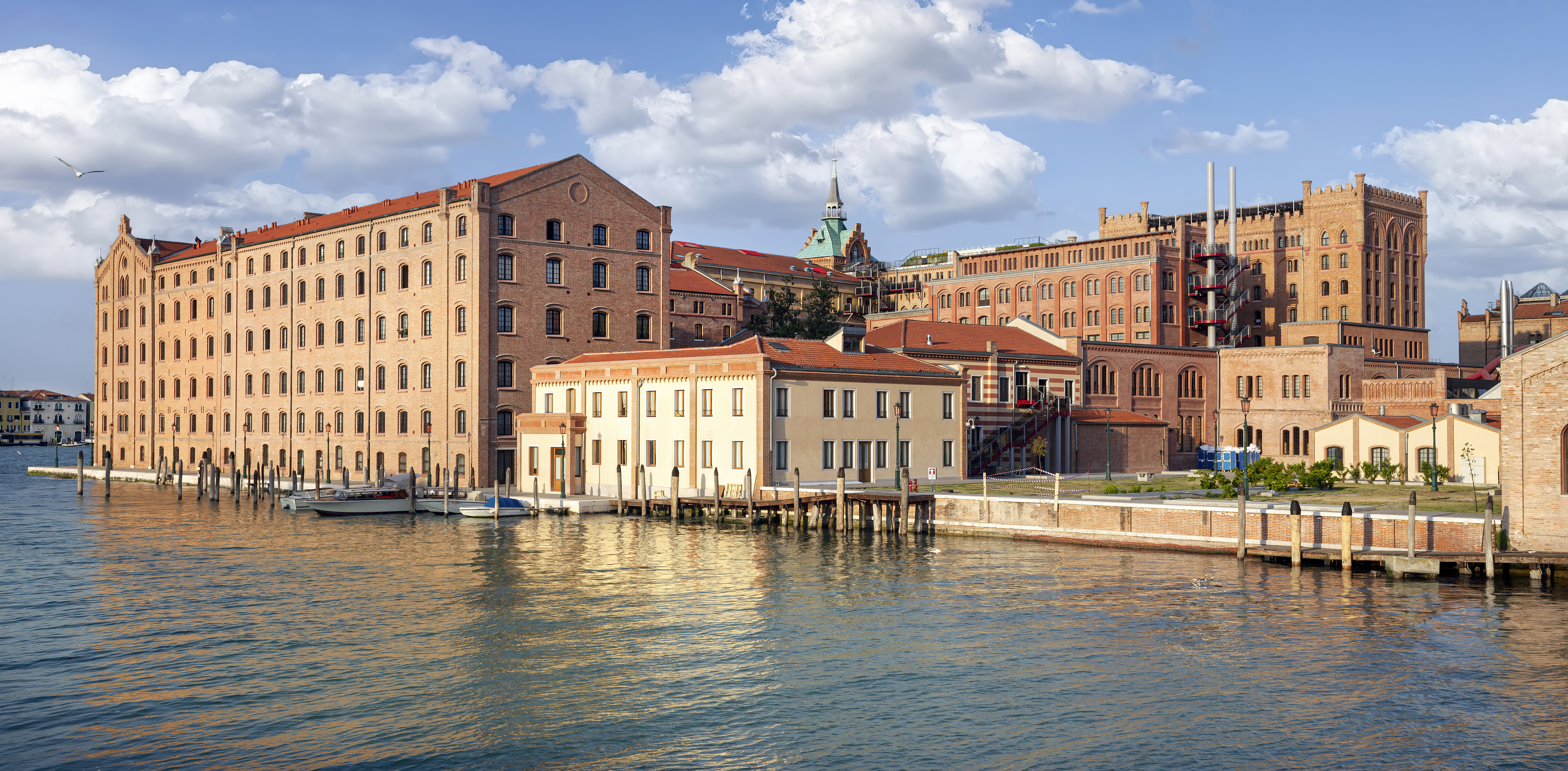
The western side of the former Stucky flour mill or Molino Stucky now Hilton Palace in Venice seen from Canale dei Lavraneri.

The Molino Stucky is a Neo-Gothic building in Venice, on the western end of Giudecca island, near the ancient village Fortuny. It was designed by Ernst Wullekopf and built between 1884 and 1895 by the Swiss businessman Giovanni Stucky, whose father had married into the Italian Forti family and moved to the Veneto. It was first built as a flour mill supplied by boats across the lagoon and also operated as a pasta factory.

Extensions were added in 1895 but it began to decline in the 1910s before being permanently closed in 1955. It was taken on by the Acqua Pia Antica Marcia company (part of the Acqua Marcia Group) in 1994 and a restoration by the Sovrintendenza alle Belle Arti began in 1998. The company went into partnership with the Hilton Hotels chain in the mid-2000s, with a plan to turn it into a hotel and conference centre with 379 rooms, a rooftop swimming pool and a two-thousand seat conference room. Renovation work was already underway when a major fire hit on 15 April 2003, damaging the tower and the centre of the building, whilst the east wall almost collapsed into the canal. The complex opened in June 2007 and in autumn 2015 the Acqua Marcia Group went into receivership and moves to sell the complex began.

As of today, the complex houses the Hilton Molino Stucky, a five-star hotel.

== Bibliography ==
- Aa. Vv., Storia di Venezia. LʼOttocento e il Novecento. Giovanni Luigi Fontana: Lʼeconomia, Treccani, Roma 2002, pp. 1439–1484.
- Aa. Vv., Venezia, città industriale. Gli insediamenti produttivi del XIX secolo, Marsilio, Venezia 1980.
- Francesco Basaldella, Giudecca: storia e testimonianze, Marcon Uniongrafica, Venezia, 1986.
- Cesco Chinello, Classe, movimento, organizzazione: le lotte operaie a Marghera/Venezia 1945-1955, Franco Angeli, Milano 1984.
- Rafaella Giuseppetti, Un castello in laguna. Storia dei Molini Stucky, Il Cardo, Venezia 1995.
- Lavinia Cavalletti La dinastia Stuky 1841-1941 Editrice Studio LT2
