= Giovanni Stucky =

Swiss businessman

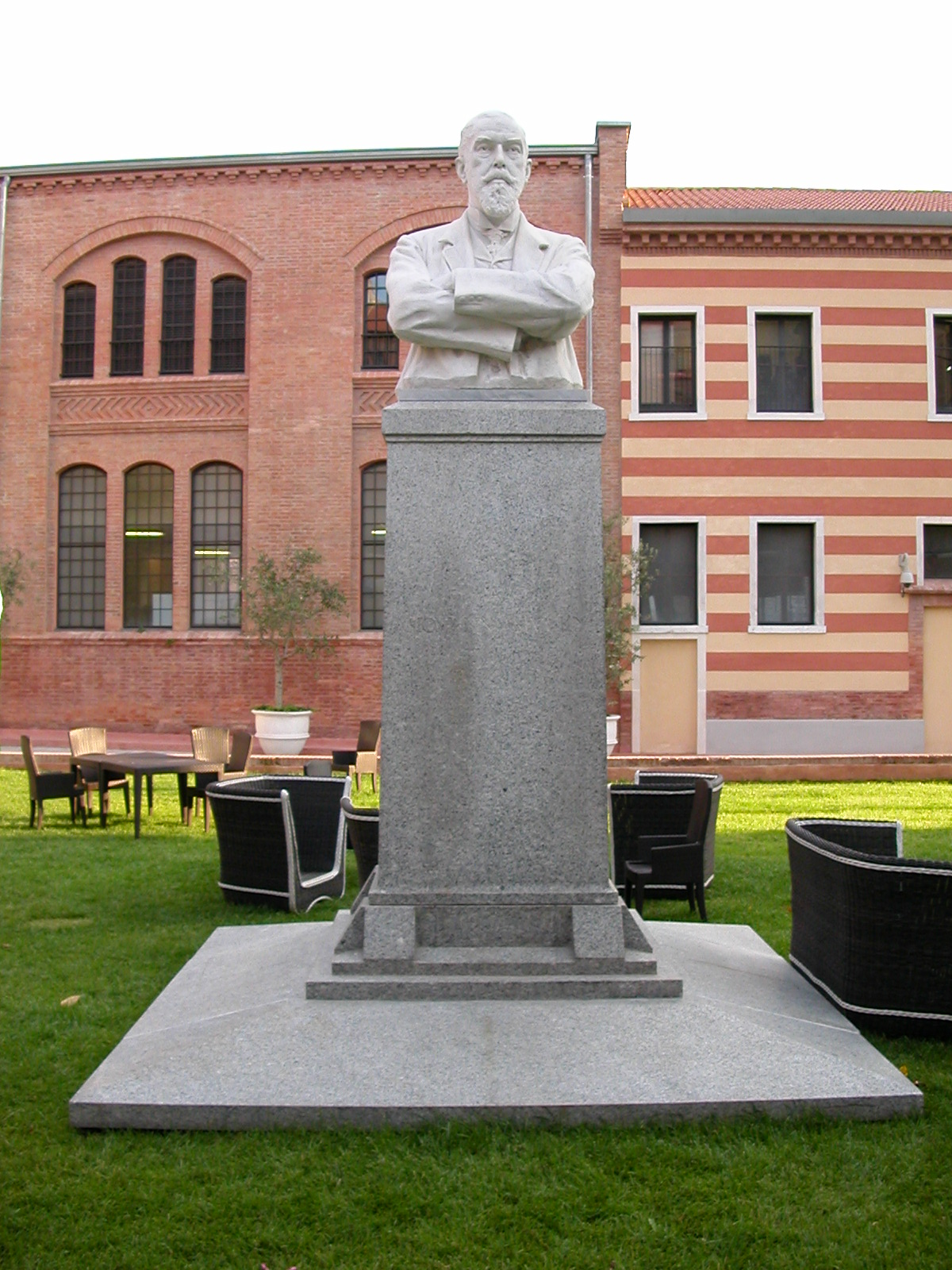
Bust to Stucky in the Molino Stucky mill in Venice, which he opened.

Giovanni Stucky (27 May 1843, in Venice – 21 May 1910) was a Swiss businessman. His father was the mill owner Hans Stucky from Münsingen in Bern Canton, who had lived in Italy since 1837 and in Venice since 1841. Giovanni Stucky became the richest man in Venice by making pasta, the Stucky brand becoming famous worldwide.

== Bibliography ==
- Francesco Amendolagine (ed.): Molino Stucky. Ricerche storiche e ipotesi di restauro. Il cardo, Venedig 1995, ISBN 88-8079-050-1.
- Tatiana Bonazza: Gli Stucky di Venezia: profilo di una famiglia imprenditoriale tra Otto e Novecento. 2001 (Padua, Universität, Tesi di laurea (politikwissenschaftliche Dissertation), 2001).
- Lavinia Cavalletti: La dinastia Stucky, 1841–1941. Storia del molino di Venezia e della famiglia. Da Manin a Mussolini. Studio LT2, Venezia 2011, ISBN 978-88-88028-68-2
