= List of hotels in Uganda =

This is a list of notable hotels in Uganda.

== Gulu ==
- Acholi Inn

== Chobe (Murchison Falls National Park) ==
- Chobe Safari Lodge

== Entebbe ==
- Imperial Golf View Hotel
- Imperial Resort Beach Hotel

== Kampala ==
- Russel Hotel Kampala
- Grand Imperial Hotel
- Hilton Garden Inn Kampala
- Imperial Royale Hotel
- Kampala Hilton Hotel
- Kampala Intercontinental Hotel
- Kampala Protea Hotel
- Kampala Serena Hotel
- Kampala Sheraton Hotel
- Kampala Speke Hotel
- Munyonyo Commonwealth Resort
- Speke Resort and Conference Center
- The Pearl of Africa Hotel Kampala

== Lweeza, Wakiso District ==
- Lake Victoria Serena Resort

== Masindi ==
- Masindi Hotel
