= Hilton Garden Inn Kampala =

Ugandan hotel

- Map of Kampala showing the location of Kampala Hilton Garden Inn.

General information
- Location: 72 Kira Road, Kampala, Uganda
- Coordinates: 00°20′15″N 32°35′02″E
- Opening: 2019
- Operator: Alibhai Family

Other information
- Number of rooms: 96

Website
- Official website

The Hilton Garden Inn Kampala, part of the Hilton Garden Inn chain, is a hotel in Kampala, the capital and largest city of Uganda. The building, under development since 2018, was commissioned in May 2019.

== Location ==
The hotel is located in the Kawempe Division of the city of Kampala on Mulago Hill. The building stands along Old Kira Road, opposite the British High Commission. The geographical coordinates of the hotel are 00°20'16.0"N, 32°35'02.0"E (Latitude:0.337778; Longitude:32.583889).

== Overview ==
This hotel is a purposely-built new construction with 96 rooms. The hotel was built and will be managed by the Alibhai Family, with a commissioning date in the second quarter of 2019. The hotel was commissioned by the Ugandan Tourism minister Ephraim Kamuntu, in May 2019.

== Other developments ==
The international hotel chain, Hilton Hotels, having made failed attempts in the past, is expected to enter Uganda with two branded hotels, (a) the 244-room Kampala Hilton Hotel in the Nakasero neighborhood and (b) this hotel with a planned room count of 96 rooms. The 250-room The Pearl of Africa Hotel Kampala began as a planned Hilton-branded establishments, but disagreements halted the partnership.

== See also ==
- Kampala Capital City Authority
- Kampala Serena Hotel
- List of tallest buildings in Kampala
