= Bitature =

Bitature is a surname. Notable people with the surname include:

- Anna Bitature Mugenyi, Ugandan justice
- Nataliey Bitature (born 1989), Ugandan entrepreneur and executive
- Patrick Bitature, Ugandan businessman
