= Imperial Royale Hotel =

Hotel in Kampala, Uganda

- imperial Royale Hotel

- Location within Kampala

General information
- Location: 7 Kintu Road, Kampala, Uganda
- Coordinates: 00°19′08″N 32°35′08″E
- Opening: 2007

Other information
- Number of rooms: 275
- Number of suites: 10

Website
- Homepage

Imperial Royale Hotel is a hotel in Kampala, Uganda's capital city.

== Location ==
The Imperial Royale Hotel is located on Kintu Road, on Nakasero Hill, in the heart of one of Kampala's most exclusive neighborhoods. Nearby landmarks include the Kampala Sheraton Hotel, the 5-star Kampala Serena Hotel and Kampala Speke Hotel. The coordinates of Imperial Royale Hotel are:00 19 08N, 32 35 08E (Latitude:0.3189; Longitude:32.5854).

== Overview ==
The hotel opened in 2007, in time for the Commonwealth Heads of Government Meeting 2007, which took place in Kampala in November 2007. The hotel served as the media center for the meeting. The hotel has 275 rooms, including ten (10) suites. It has extensive underground parking, enough to accommodate 600 vehicles. Imperial Royale Hotel is a popular location for conferences. The hotel ballroom is also the filming location for the Zain Africa Challenge.

== Ownership ==
The hotel is a member of the Imperial Hotels Group, which owns three hotels in Kampala and another three in Entebbe. As of July 2014, the group's hotels and real estate holdings, include the following:

Kampala, Uganda

- Imperial Royale Hotel
- Grand Imperial Hotel
- Equatoria Shopping Mall

Entebbe, Uganda

- Imperial Botanical Beach Hotel
- Imperial Resort Beach Hotel
- Imperial Golf View Hotel

== See also ==
- Imperial Hotels Group
- List of tallest buildings in Kampala

== Photos ==
- Photo of Imperial Royale Hotel in 2007
