= Independence Monument (Uganda) =

Monument in Kampala, Uganda

Coordinates: 0°18′56″N 32°34′54″E

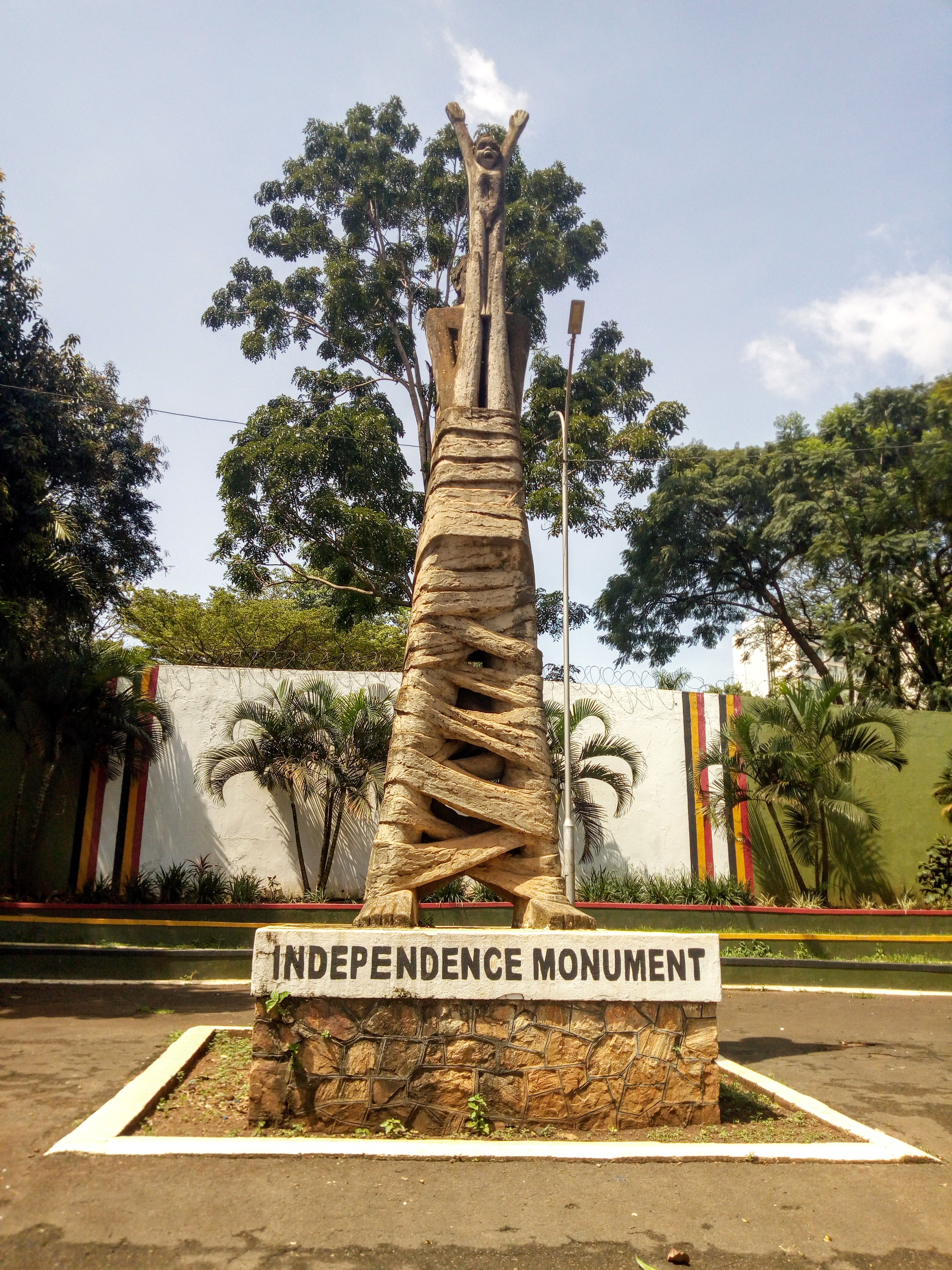
- Interactive map of Independence Monument
- Location: Uganda
- Designer: Gregory Maloba
- Length: 29 ft (8.8 m)

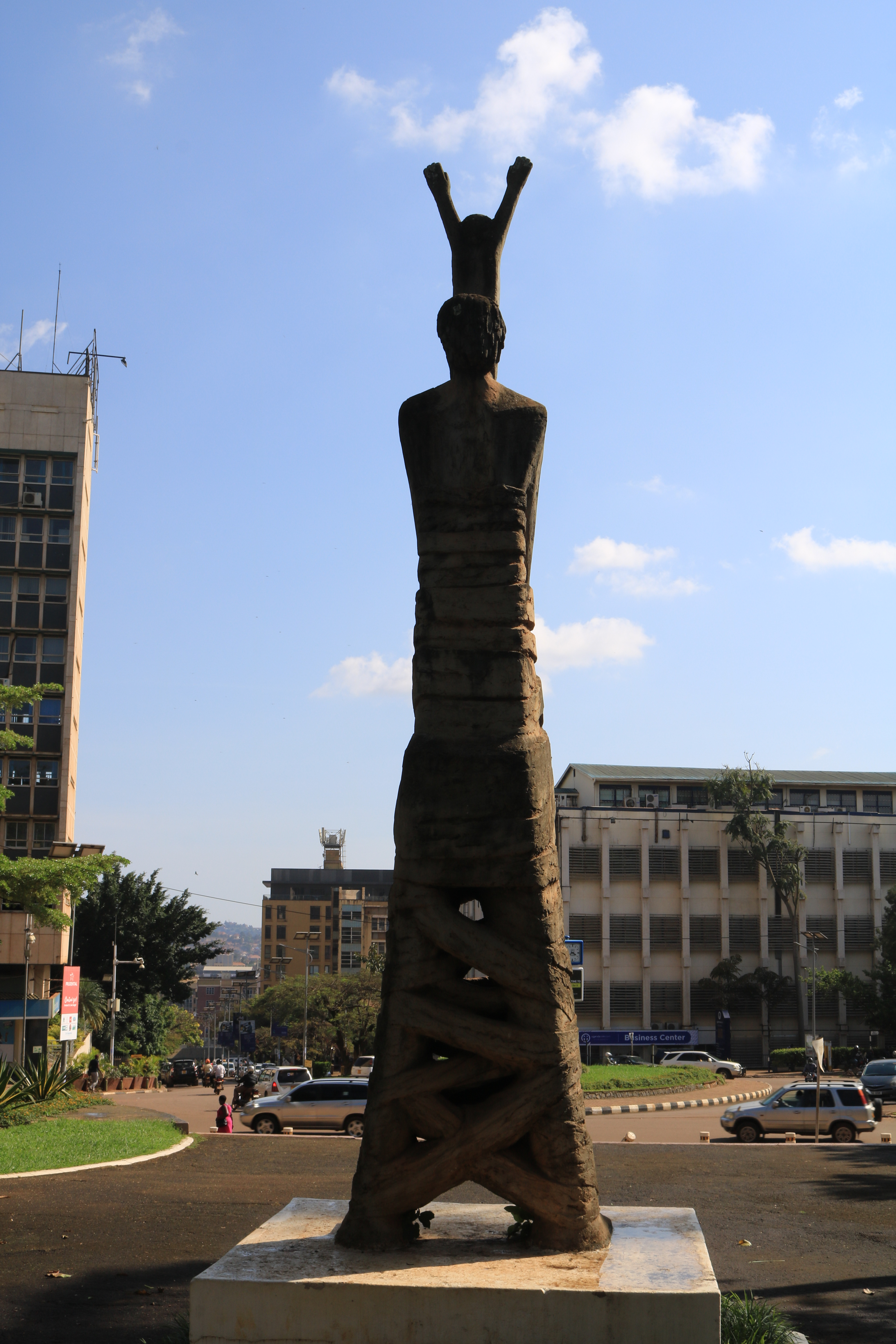
Statue commemorating 'The 1962 Ugandan Independence'

The Independence Monument, also known as the Uganda Independence Monument is a sculpture which symbolizes the independence of Uganda from British colonialism on 9 October 1962. It is 29 feet (6 meters) tall concrete sculpture located in the center of Kampala City in the King George V Jubilee gardens at Nile Avenue between Sheraton Kampala Hotel, Grand Imperial Hotel to the right, and Standard Chartered bank to the left in Uganda. This monument replaces the King George V of Britain statue which used to occupy the area.

== Background ==
The Independence Monument was unveiled on 8 October 1962, a day prior to the day of independence of Uganda from the British Empire on 9 October 1962. It was unveiled by Kalule Settaala who was the minister for culture and community development of that times and other officials.

The monument was carved by Gregory Maloba, a Kenyan sculptor, former student and an art lecturer at Makerere University's Margaret Trowel of Industrial and Fine art from 1939-1965. The construction of the monument was financed by the British colonial government.

Gregory Maloba was born in 1922 and died in 2007 at his home in Kenya after he had fled Uganda in late 1960s. While in Kenya, he lectured at University of Nairobi and Kenyatta University.

== Meaning of the monument ==
The monument is designed on a metal framework with a mother carrying a child raising the hand upwards in the sky signifying excitement and freedom in Uganda. On the monument, the mother stands firm on the ground having both legs positioned apart and straps around the legs and waist symbolizing firmness while the "ropes" around the legs shows the freedom from the bondage of colonialism in Uganda.

== Significance ==
The independence monument is used on the currency notes from the paper denomination of 1000 UGX up to the 50,000UGX which is Uganda's highest legal tender and appears in many promotional materials and documents of Uganda.

== See also ==
- Sheraton Kampala Hotel
- Grand Imperial Hotel
- Standard Chartered Bank
