= Imperial Resort Beach Hotel =

Hotel in Entebbe, Uganda

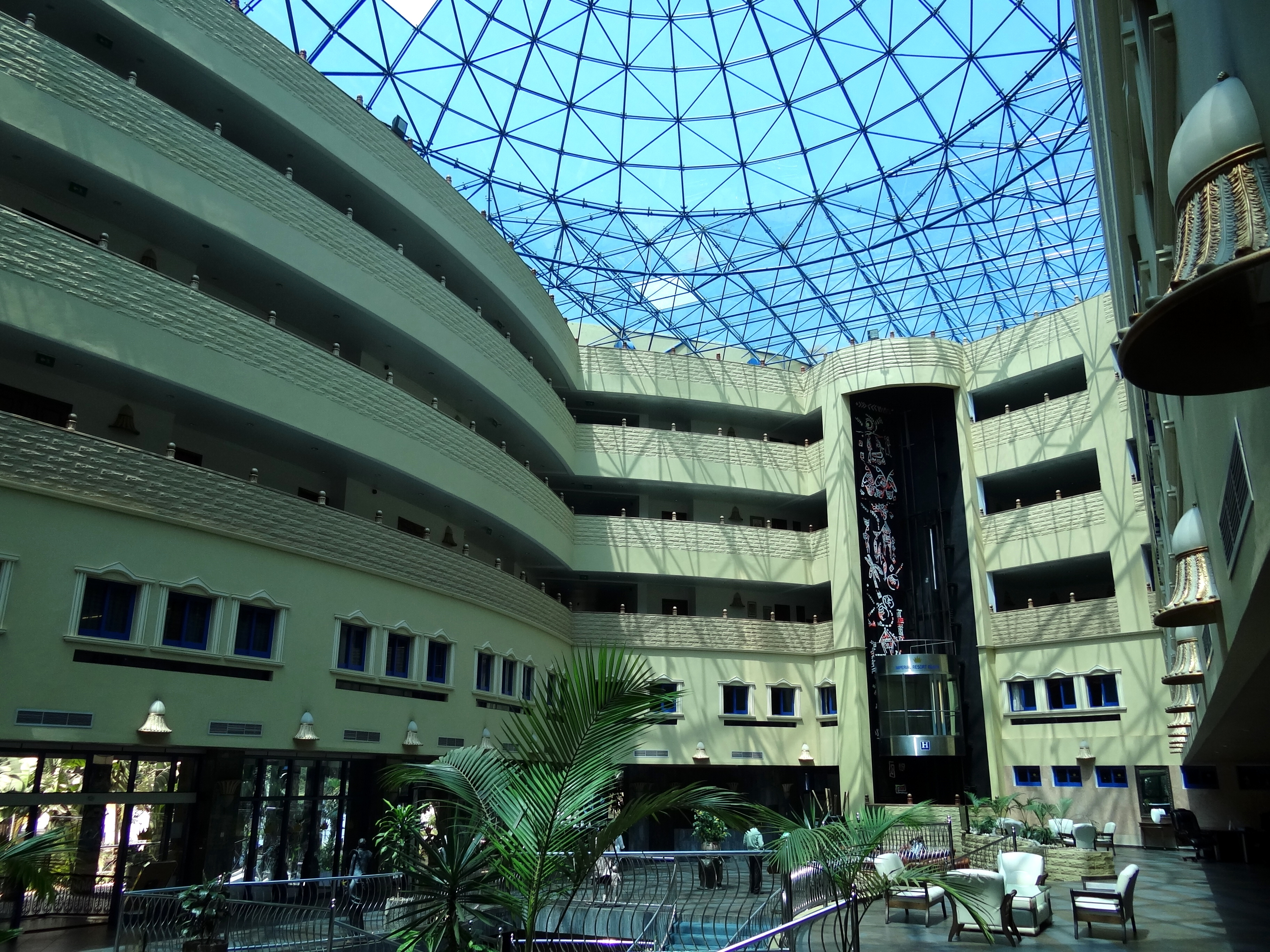
- Inside view of imperial resort Beach Hotel
- Interactive map of the Imperial Resort Beach Hotel area

General information
- Location: Entebbe, Uganda
- Coordinates: 00°02′48″N 32°28′16″E

Technical details
- Floor count: 4

Other information
- Number of rooms: 181
- Number of suites: 6

Website
- Homepage

Imperial Resort Beach Hotel is a five star hotel in Entebbe, Uganda on 27 acres of landscaped gardens on the shores of lake Victoria.

== Location ==
It is located on the shores of Lake Victoria, Africa's largest fresh-water lake, not far from Uganda's largest airport, Entebbe International Airport. This location is approximately 42 kilometres (26 mi), by road, south of Kampala, Uganda's capital city. The coordinates of Imperial Resort Beach Hotel are:00 02 48N, 32 28 16E (Latitude:0.0467; Longitude:32.4710).

== Overview ==
The establishment has 181 rooms, on 4 (four) floors. Of the rooms, five (5) are junior suites and one (one) is a presidential suite. The hotel is a member of the Imperial Hotels Group, which owns three hotels in Entebbe and three others in Kampala with substantial ownership in the hands of Karim Hiriji. As of July 2014, the groups hotels and real estate holdings include the following:

Entebbe, Uganda

- Imperial Resort Beach Hotel
- Imperial Botanical Beach Hotel
- Imperial Golf View Hotel

Kampala, Uganda

- Imperial Royale Hotel
- Grand Imperial Hotel
- Equatoria Shopping Mall

== History ==
The hotel was constructed by the team led by its executive director Karim Hirji at a cost of $31m in 13 months. It hosted the international women judges conference in May before it was officially opened by President Museveni on 5th December 2004.

== See also ==
- Imperial Hotels Group
- Entebbe
