= Aya Group =

Business conglomerate based in Uganda

Coordinates: 00°22′39″N 32°33′17″E

- Industry: Investments, Transportation, Food Processing
- Headquarters: Kampala, Uganda
- Key people: Mohammed Hamid; Group Chairman & Managing Director
- Products: Wheat, Bread, Flour, Construction, Hotels & Resorts
- Total assets: US$400+ million (2012)
- Number of employees: 5,000+ (2011)

The Aya Group of Companies, commonly referred to as the Aya Group, is a business conglomerate based in Uganda.

== Location ==
With headquarters at 62 Bombo Road, Kawempe, in northern Kampala, Uganda's largest city, the group's business activities extend to the countries of Burundi, the Democratic Republic of the Congo, Kenya, Rwanda, Tanzania, Uganda, and South Sudan. Aya Group also maintains subsidiaries in Dubai, United Arab Emirates and in New York City. The company headquarters is located in Kawempe, approximately 10 kilometres (6 mi), by road, north of the central business district of the city. The geographical coordinates of the Aya Group headquarters are 0°22'39.0"N, 32°33'17.0"E (Latitude:0.377500; Longitude:32.554725).

== Overview ==
As of June 2014, the Aya Group was a fast-growing conglomerate. It is one of the largest corporate employers in Uganda, with over 5,000 people under payroll. With a total asset base in excess of US$400 million, the group is involved in the following business lines, among others: food processing, investments, transportation, real estate development, hospitality, mining, and merchandising.

The 300-room The Pearl of Africa Hotel Kampala, was constructed by Aya Investments, a subsidiary of the group. It sits on Nakasero Hill in central Kampala. The hotel cost over US$150 million to build. It was expected to be Uganda's third 5-star hotel, next to the Kampala Serena Hotel, which was commissioned in 2006, and the Kampala Intercontinental Hotel, currently under construction. Because the majority of construction materials are sourced locally, the construction of this hotel has contributed enormously to Uganda's economy.

Fifi Transport Limited, another group subsidiary, owns a fleet of Mercedes-Benz trucks.

== Aya Foundation ==
The Aya Foundation is a non-profit charitable organization that was set up on the urging of Mohammed Hamid, the Group Chairman. The foundation assists organizations that cater for needy children. One area that the foundation pays special attention to is the provision of pediatric medications.

== Subsidiary companies ==
The Aya Group includes but is not limited to the following companies:

- Aya Bakery Limited - Kampala, Uganda
- Aya Biscuits Limited - Kampala, Uganda
- Aya Foundation Limited - Kampala, Uganda - non-profit charity, helping needy children
- Aya Investments Limited - Kampala Uganda - Owners of Kampala Hilton Hotel - One of the only three 5-star hotels in Uganda
- Aya Mills Limited - Kampala, Uganda
- Fifi Transport Limited - Kampala, Uganda
- Pan Afric Commodities Limited - Kampala, Uganda
- Aya Mining Limited - Kampala, Uganda
- Aya Mohammed Trade Plc. - Dubai, United Arab Emirates
- Aya Property Developers Inc. - New York City

== See also ==
- List of tallest buildings in Kampala
- List of conglomerates in Uganda
- Kawempe Division
- Kampala Capital City Authority
