= Elizabeth Nalugemwa =

Ugandan entrepreneur, author, farmer

- Born: 16 October 1994 (age 31)
- Citizenship: Ugandan
- Education: Advanced Certificate in Business Administration, Diploma in Business Administration
- Alma mater: Nsamizi Training Institute of Social Development, Muteesa I Royal University
- Occupations: Entrepreneur, author, farmer, ceo of kyaffe coffee farmers.
- Awards: Obama Foundation Leader 2018, Women stop hunger France 2019

Elizabeth Nalugemwa (born 16 October 1994), alias Achiever, is a Ugandan entrepreneur, author, farmer and Founder and CEO of Kyaffe Coffee Farmers from Masaka district.

She was recognized by the Obama Foundation in 2018 for her work in empowering women coffee farmers and fostering leadership in her community.

== Early life and education ==
Nalugemwa was born on 16 October 1994 and grew up in Masaka District with a single mother of six children who was a coffee farmer and seller. She studied an Advanced Certificate in Business Administration at Mutessa Royal University, Diploma in Business Administration at Nsamizi Training Institute of Social Development in Mpigi District. After attaining her diploma, she moved to Kampala in search of employment opportunities.

She realized that the majority of the coffee brands found in supermarkets are imported and cost a lot more per kilogram than farmers receive. She started by roasting coffee beans in a skilled manner on a charcoal stove for sale in Kampala then a link opened up an opportunity to the Consortium for enhancing University Responsiveness to Agribusiness Development Limited(CURAD) which incubated and supported her startup as it was through coffee processing and packaging.

In 2017, Kyaffe Farmers Coffee was born at the Social Innovation Academy and was able to acquire its own coffee farm in 2019.

== Career ==
Nalugemwa is an entrepreneur, farmer, founder, and CEO of Kyaffe coffee(Kyaffee means 'ours' in her native language, Luganda), a social business dedicated to advancing the lives of female coffee farmers and their children through rural wealth creation and community transformation With more than 1,500 women.

She is the founder of Seedloans which helps female smallholder farmers in Uganda grow more to feed their families. She serves as director at Kyaffe Junior School and a cultural integration specialist.

Nalugemwa is an Artiste/writer who does writing for social change and wrote three books, including 'Grand mama’s', 'No shame' None published. She is the founder of Bambobiz an organisation that empowers artists to use their talents to create comic and animations for social change.

== Contributions ==
Through partnerships with well-established health centers and schools, farmers and their children can receive high-quality education and emergency treatment. Kyaffe processes the coffee into finished branded coffee products that are sold, and part the money generated helps run their community projects like schools and the Kyaffe Coffee Center.

She provides training for women to grow their coffee businesses.

In 2018, Kyaffe started a coffee briquette project to recycle used coffee husks and agricultural.

== Awards and accomplishments ==
- Obama Foundation Leader 2018.
- Women Stop Hunger Award winner 2019.
- 2019 Women Stop Hunger in France, Paris.
- 2020 Finalists of the Annual AFS Prize for Young Global Citizens .
- Her Social startup Seedloans co-founded by ODID(Merlin Stein) student in 2021 won first prize in the Fowler Global Social Innovation Challenge (GSIC).
- Finalist for The Pamoja Founders Project in 2024 but didn't win.

== Personal life ==
She loves reading and is a Christian.

== See also ==
- Nataliey Bitature
