= Acholi =

Acholi may refer to:

- Acholi people, a Luo nation of Uganda, in the Northern part of the country
- Acholi language, a Nilotic language
- Acholi Inn, a building in Gulu, Uganda
- Acholi nationalism, a political ideology of Acholi people
