= Kampala Hilton Hotel =

Ugandan hotel

Hilton Kampala Hotel & Twed Heights Office
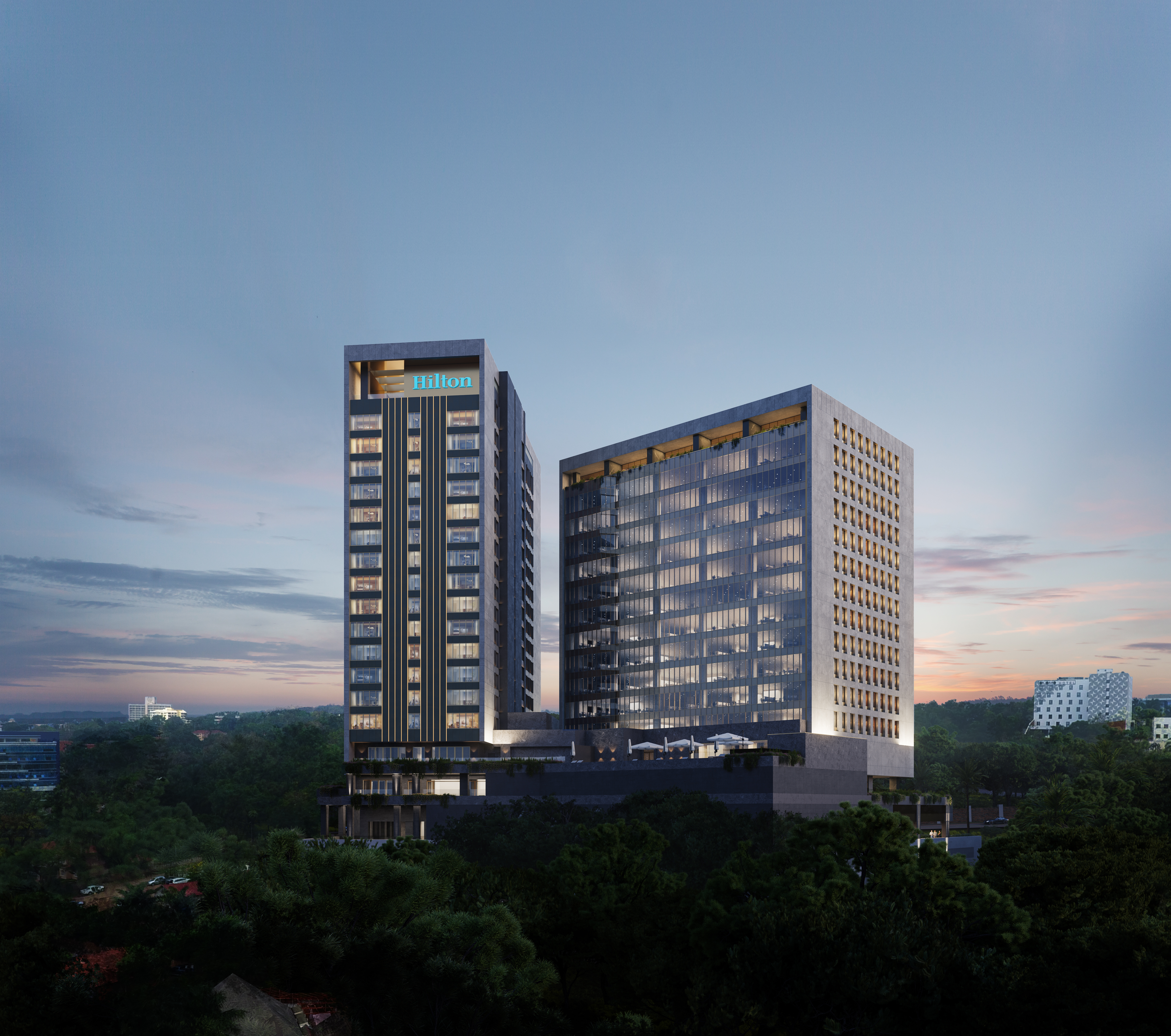
- Front view of Kampala Hilton Hotel at Nakasero Hill

- Map of Kampala showing the location of Kampala Hilton Hotel.

General information
- Location: Kampala, Uganda
- Coordinates: 00°19′44″N 32°34′52″E
- Opening: TBA
- Owner: TWED Property Development Company
- Operator: TWED Property Development Company

Technical details
- Floor count: 26
- Floor area: 75,600 cubic metres (2,669,789 cu ft)

Design and construction
- Architects: Turner & Townsend
- Developer: TWED Property Development Company

Other information
- Number of rooms: 257
- Number of restaurants: 6
- Parking: 5 basement floors

The Kampala Hilton Hotel is a hotel under construction in Kampala, the capital and largest city of Uganda. Under development since 2018, the building was expected to be commissioned in the fourth quarter of 2020.

== Location ==
The hotel is located in Central Kampala on Nakasero Hill. The building stands along Muwafo Road. The geographical coordinates of the hotel are 00°19'44.0"N, 32°34'52.0"E (Latitude:0.328889; Longitude:32.581111).

== Overview ==
Dan Twebaze, a Ugandan commercial real-estate developer, began developing the skyscraper in 2018, using his in-house Twed Construction Limited. On 22 March 2019, representatives of Hilton International signed a hotel management agreement with TWED Property Development Company, to manage the hotel, under the Hilton brand. In order to speed up construction, and in an attempt to meet the December 2020 planned commission date, ROKO Construction Company took over the construction as of March 2019.

The complex will comprise several high-end meeting and conferencing facilities including a ballroom that can accommodate up to 500 guests, parking facilities for up to 518 vehicles, a fitness centre and an outdoor swimming pool. It will also host several restaurants and bars including a sports bar and a rooftop panoramic view bar, offering views of the city, Kampala Golf Course and Lake Victoria. Several suites will be available at the hotel, including a Presidential Suite.

In February 2022, Capital FM Uganda reported that construction of the two tower office-hotel complex was complete. What remained was the interior finishes to Hilton Hotels' specifications. The hotel tower has 19 above-ground floors and the office tower has 16 above-ground floors. Each of the towers has five basement floors. A total of more than 400 direct jobs are available to qualified Ugandans.

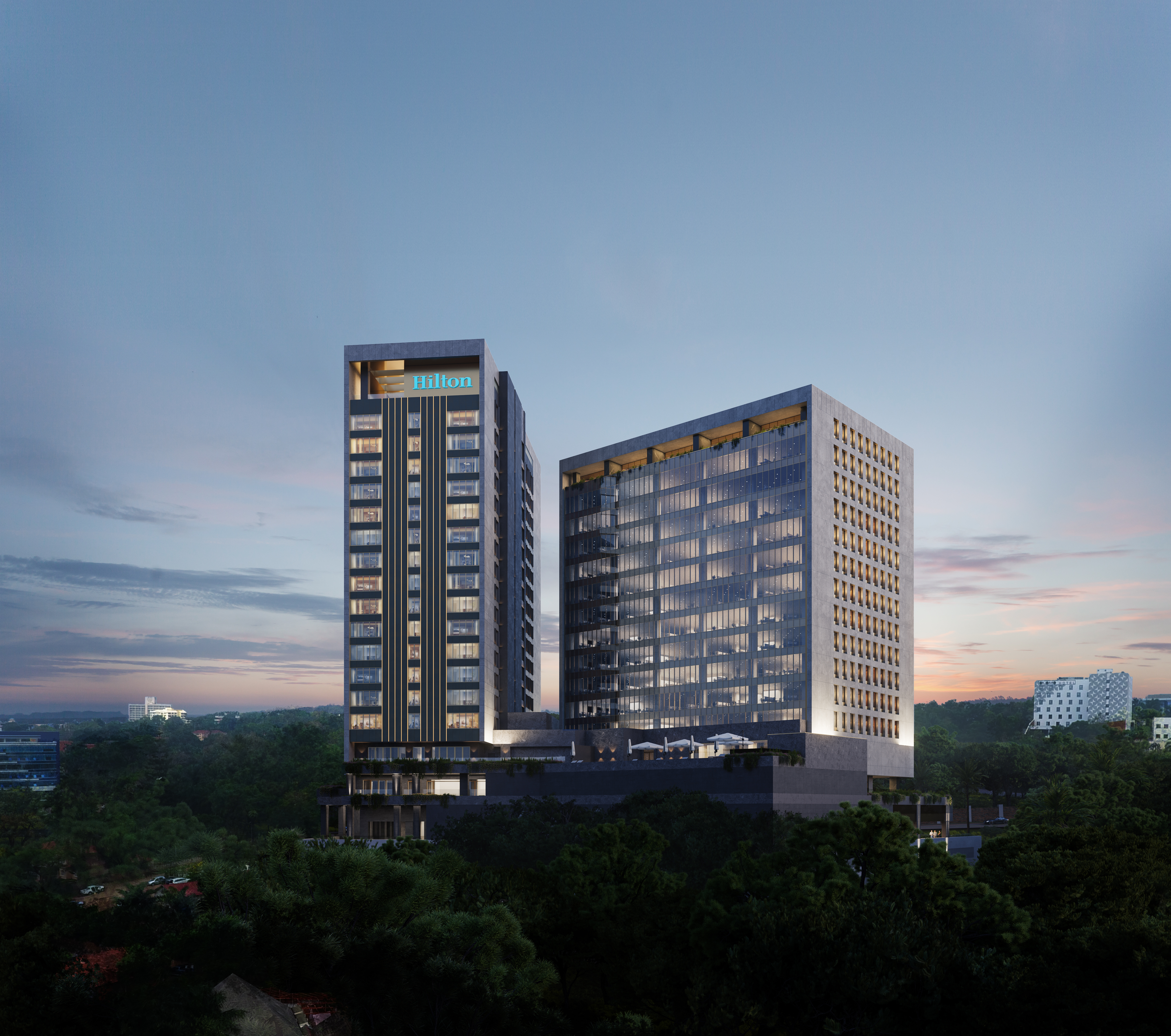

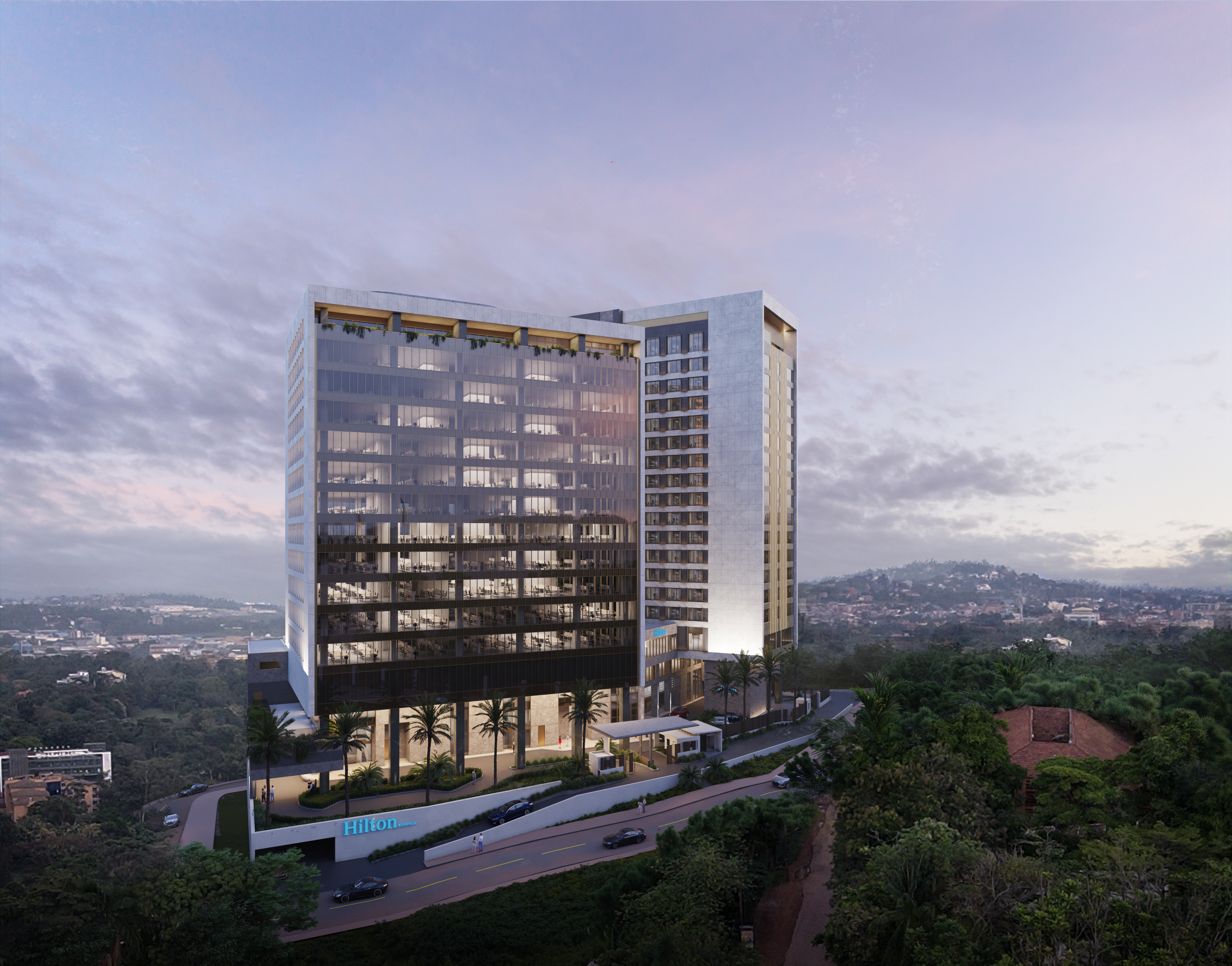

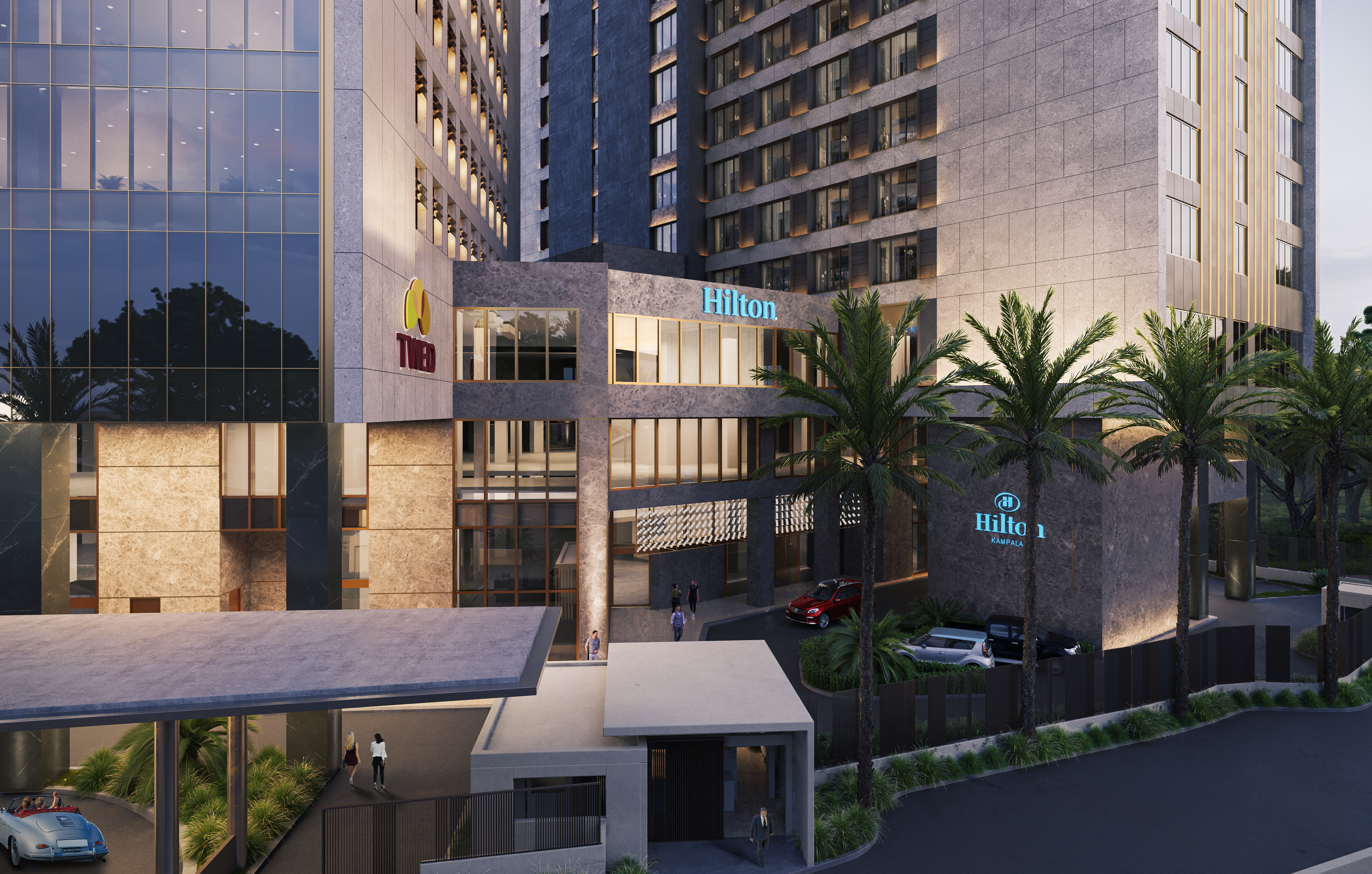

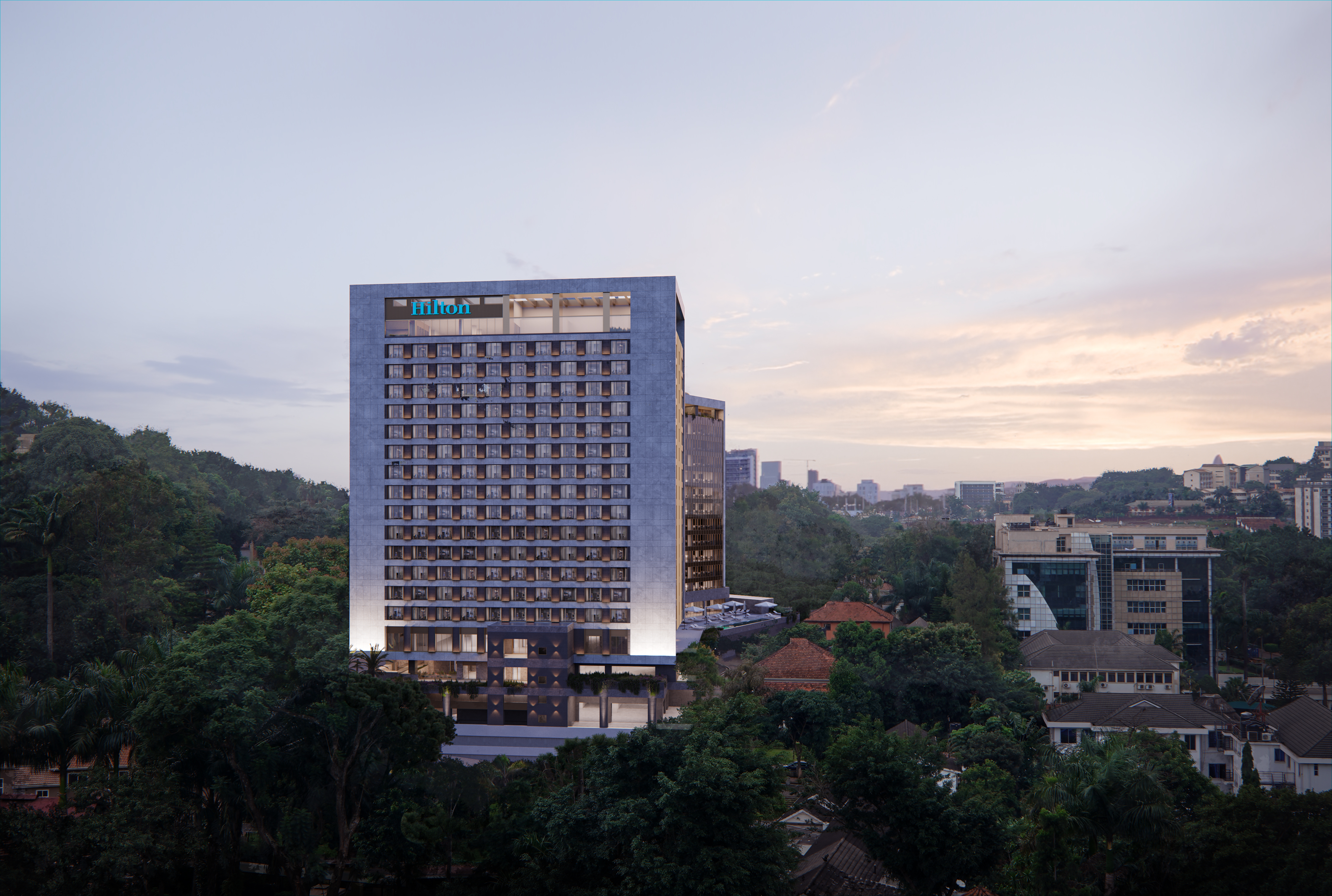

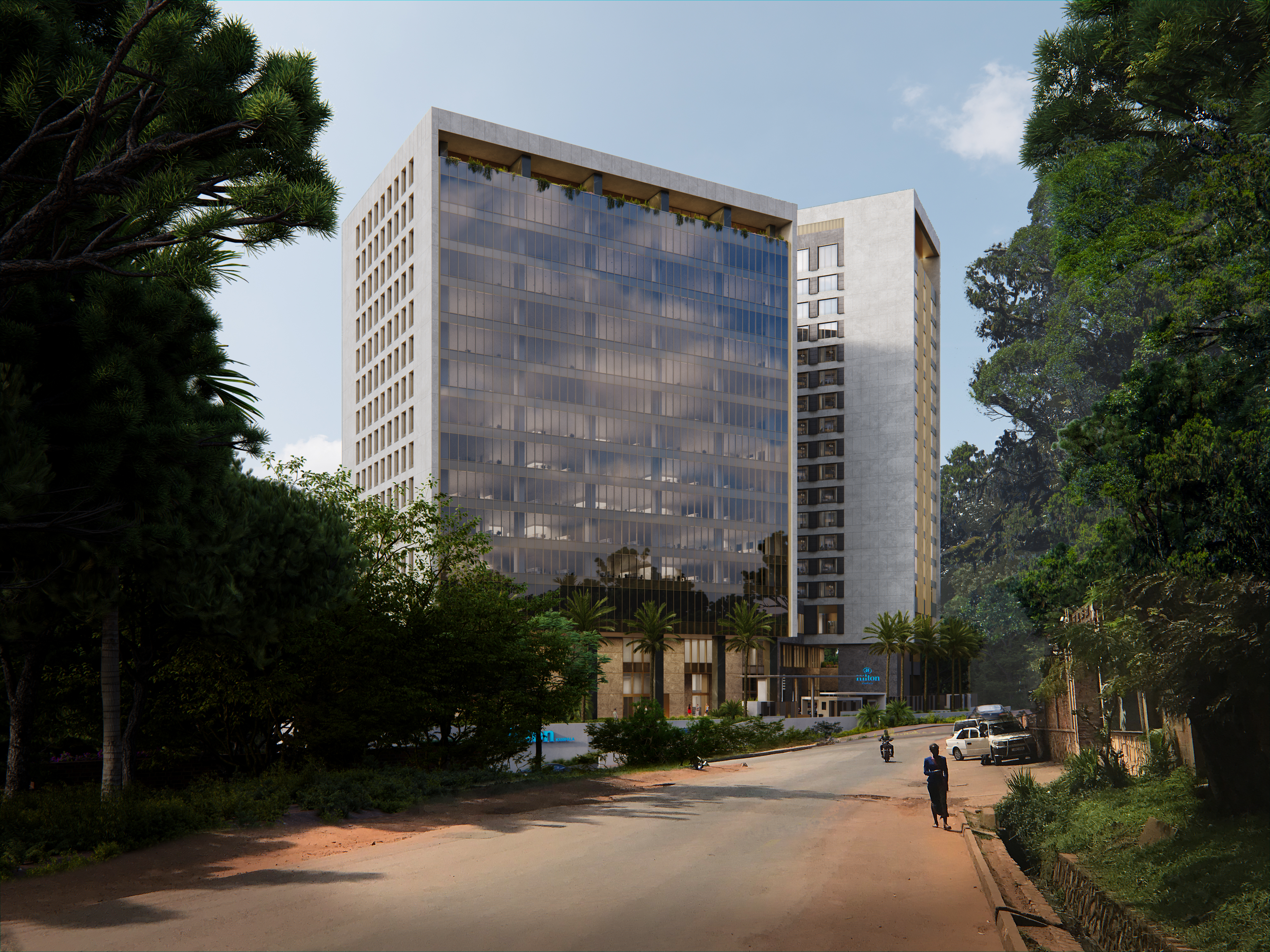

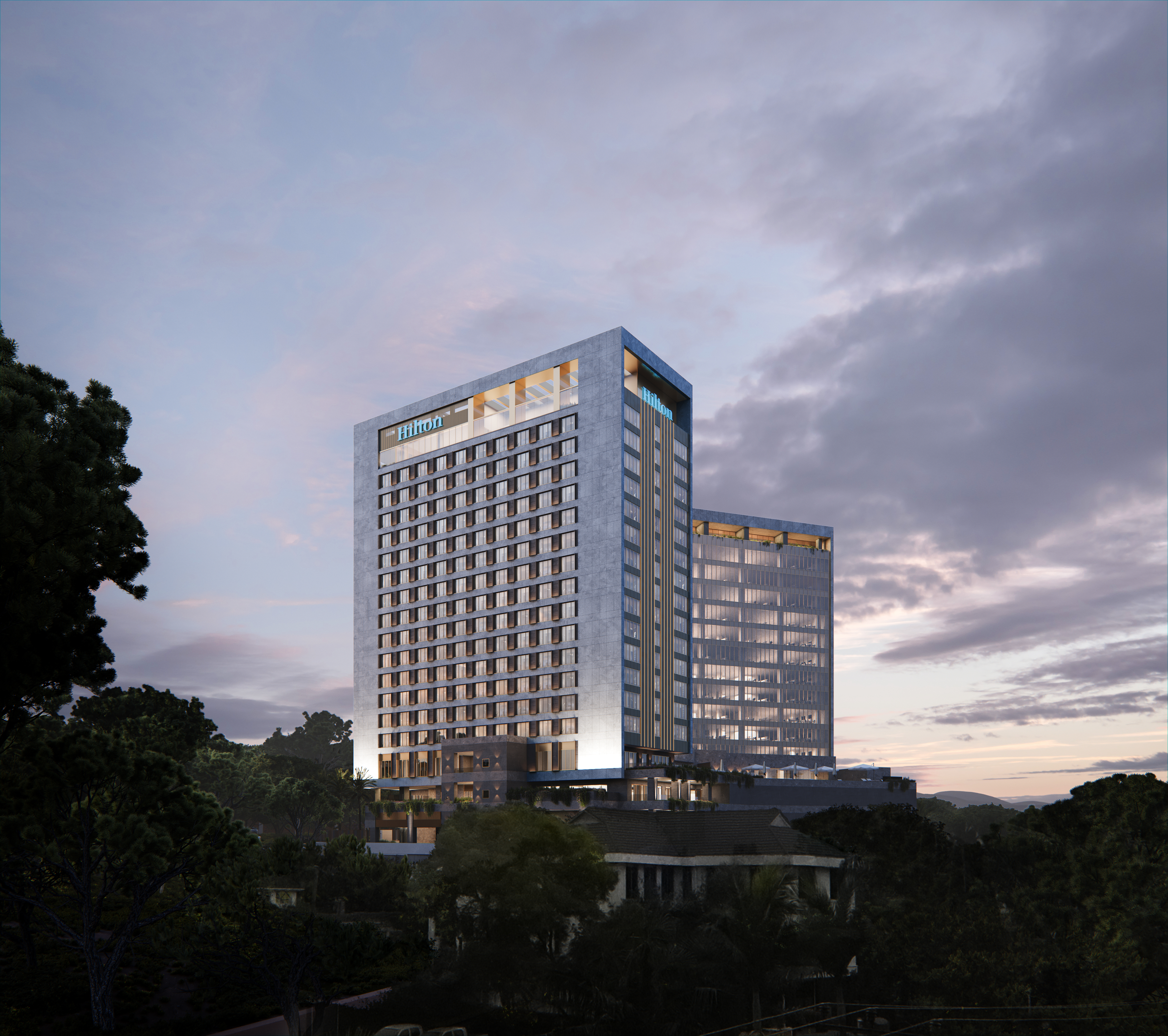

== Current Progress ==
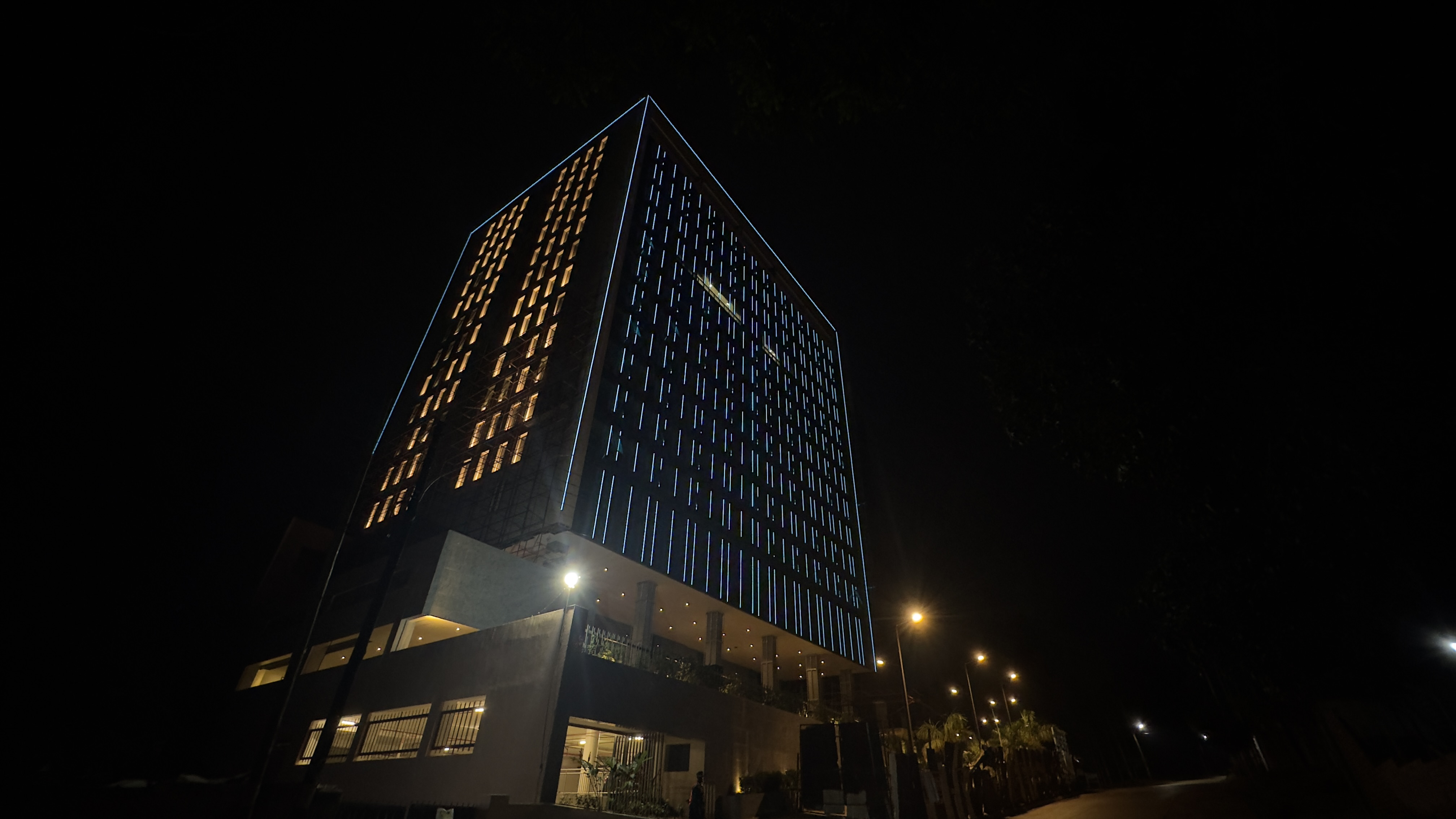

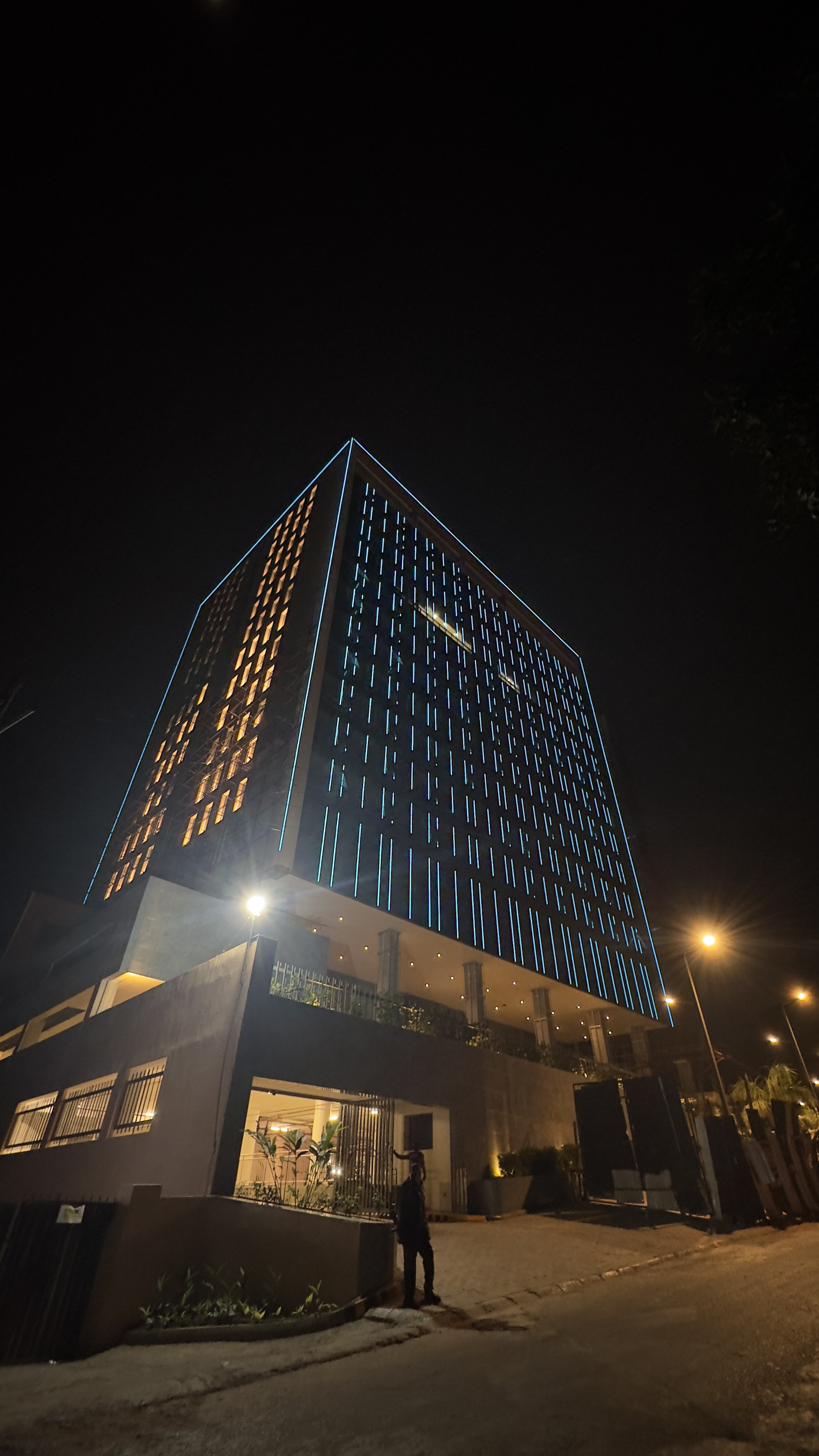

== Other developments ==
The international hotel chain, Hilton Hotels, having made failed attempts in the past, is expected to enter Uganda with two branded hotels, (a) the 96-room Kampala Hilton Garden Inn in the Kamwookya neighborhood and (b) this hotel with a planned room count of 257 rooms. The 250-room The Pearl of Africa Hotel Kampala began as a planned Hilton-branded establishment, but disagreements halted the partnership.

== See also ==
- Kampala Capital City Authority
- Kampala Serena Hotel
- List of tallest buildings in Kampala
