= Natasha Nyonyozi =

Ugandan model and accountant

- Natasha Nyonyozi crowned Miss Uganda 2024/2025
- Born: Uganda
- Education: BSc (Hons) Accounting and Finance, Coventry University
- Occupations: Accountant; Entrepreneur; Beauty queen
- Known for: Winning Miss Uganda 2024/2025
- Title: Miss Uganda 2024/2025
- Awards: Miss Uganda 2024/2025; * Toyota Wish (Pageant Grand Prize)

Natasha Nyonyozi is a Ugandan model and accountant. On 4 August 2024 at the Kampala Sheraton hotel, she stood out among 26 contestants to be crowned Miss Uganda 2024/2025.

== Background and education ==
Natasha Nyonyozi earned her Bachelor's of Science (Hons) in Accounting and Finance from Coventry University in England.

== Career ==
Natasha is an accountant by profession and also a Ugandan entrepreneur running a beauty parlor named "girl hive" located at the cube kisementi, shop, B20 who was later crowned Miss Uganda 2024/2025 on Saturday, August 3 at a prestigious event held at Kampala Sheraton hotel.

== Personal life ==
Natasha is a strong advocate for children with special needs, those with autism in particular.

== Awards and nominations ==
On 4 August 2024 at Kampala Sheraton hotel Natasha stood out among 26 contestants and was crowned Miss Uganda 2024/2025. She was followed by Sureya Umeimah who is a cadet pilot from Jinja in the first position runners up and Joan NAbatanzi from Butambala in the second position runners up.

During the Miss Uganda 2024/2025 critical question and answer session Natasha won grand prize of the Tiara and a Toyota Wish car.

== See also ==
Miss Uganda

Kampala Sheraton hotel

Coventry University

Toyota Wish
