= Kampala Tower =

Proposed building in Uganda

- Interactive map of the Kampala Tower area

General information
- Type: Commercial
- Location: Kira Road, Kampala, Uganda
- Coordinates: 0.3350°N 32.5825°E
- Construction started: TBD
- Completed: TBD

Technical details
- Floor count: 60

Design and construction
- Architect: Capita Symonds

Kampala Tower, sometimes referred to as the East African Trade Centre, is a proposed building in Kampala, the capital of Uganda and the largest city in that country.

== Location ==
The skyscraper will be located along Kira Road, in the Kampala neighborhood known as Kamwookya, approximately 4 kilometres (2.5 mi), by road, northeast of the central business district of Kampala (pop.1,720,000). The coordinates of Kampala Tower are:0° 20' 6.00"N, 32° 34' 57.00"E (Latitude:0.3350; Longitude:32.5825).

== Overview ==
Kampala Tower will sit on a 15 acres (6.1 ha) site that currently houses the Uganda National Museum and the headquarters of Uganda Wildlife Authority, both of which will be relocated. Other nearby structures, including Kitante Primary School, may have to temporarily relocate while construction is going on. The tower will serve as the headquarters of the Ugandan Ministry of Tourism, Trade & Industry. In addition, the building will provide upscale rentable office and retail space in this rapidly-expanding neighborhood of Uganda's capital city. When completed, in 2020 as expected, the 300 metres (980 ft) tower will become the tallest building on the African continent, surpassing the Carlton Centre in Johannesburg, South Africa, which, at 222 metres (728 ft), is the reigning height leader. Kampala Tower will contain over 100,000 square metres (1,100,000 ft^{2}), of office and retail space, enough to accommodate up to 12,500 people.

== History ==
The lead planning institution is the development of this project is the Uganda Ministry of Tourism, Trade & Industry. Working with those original concepts, the London-based architectural firm Capita Symonds, assisted by the Ugandan firm Plan Systems Limited, drew several architectural designs for the Ugandan government to select from. In 2010, the architects presented their final drawings to the Ugandan Government for final approval.

== Construction costs ==
As of 2010, the estimated construction costs were US$750 million (UGX:1.83 trillion). This estimate is likely to go up, due to increased costs of building materials since that time. Government is currently sourcing for a private investor, who will fund the construction, own and operate the building for 30 years following commissioning. It is anticipated that by that time, the investor would have recouped his/her investment with reasonable profit. The building would revert to the Ugandan government following the thirty-year period. Construction was originally planned to start in 2011 and last 6 to 8 years. As of July 2014, the development is on hold, while a private investor is sought.

== Controversy ==
The development of Kampala Tower has been strongly opposed by a wide section of society. Currently, there is a civil lawsuit winding its way through the Ugandan court system, that was filed by a consortium of civil society organisations that are opposed to the project.

== See also ==
- List of tallest buildings in Kampala
- List of tallest buildings in Africa
- Kampala

== Photos and diagrams ==
- Artistic Rendering of Kampala Tower
