= Movement House =

- Interactive map of the Movement House area

General information
- Type: Commercial
- Location: Kampala, Uganda
- Coordinates: 0.318334°N 32.589445°E
- Construction started: 2013
- Completed: 2016 (Expected)

Technical details
- Floor count: 27

Design and construction
- Architect: Symbion International

Movement House is a building under construction in Kampala, the capital of Uganda and the largest city in that country. The building is sometimes referred to as NRM House, in reference to its largest tenant, the National Resistance Movement (NRM), the ruling political party in Uganda since 1986.

== Location ==
The skyscraper is located on Hannington Road, on Nakasero Hill, one of the most prestigious locations in Kampala's central business district. This location is adjacent to Crested Towers South, the headquarters of Stanbic Bank (Uganda) Limited, and Crested Tower North, the headquarters of the European Union mission in Uganda. The two towers lie to the west of Movement House. To the south, across Nile Avenue, is the under-construction Kampala Intercontinental Hotel. The coordinates of Movement House are: Latitude:0.318334; Longitude:32.589445 (+0° 19'06.00"N, +32° 35'22.00"E). The street address of the building is 36 Hannington Road, Nakasero, Kampala.

== Overview ==
When completed as expected, in 2016, the building will house the headquarters of the NRM, the ruling political party in Uganda. It will also house rentable office and retail space, restaurants, banking halls, conference facilities, a shopping complex, movie theatres, and a roof garden. The building will sit on land that measures about 1.7 acres (0.69 ha), which once belonged to the first East African Community (1967 - 1977). It will be one of the tallest buildings in the city, at 27 stories above ground.

== History ==
The NRM is attempting to generate income for itself by investing in commercial real estate. The 27-storey building is being constructed in memory of the 27 young people who started the NRM in February 1981. Construction began in 2013, to commemorate 27 years since NRM first shot its way to power in 1986.

== Construction costs ==
The estimated total cost of construction is approximately US$12.5 million (UGX:30 billion). The funds will be raised from about 100,000 willing party members with an average donation of 300,000 Uganda Shillings (US$125) each. Construction is expected to begin in early 2013 with commissioning of the building in 2016. As of December 2014, approximately UGX:7 billion (US$2.6 million) had been raised from party members. Another UGX:16 billion (approx.: US $5 million), was raised during June 2015, at two separate dinners hosted by President Museveni at State House, Entebbe.

== See also ==
- List of political parties in Uganda
- Politics of Uganda
- List of tallest buildings in Kampala
