= Kampala Protea Hotel =

Hotel in Kampala, Uganda

- Interactive map of the Kampala Protea Hotel area

General information
- Location: 4 Elgon Terrace; Kololo, Kampala; Uganda
- Coordinates: 00°19′43″N 32°35′16″E
- Owner: Patrick Bitature
- Management: Simba Group of Companies

Other information
- Number of rooms: 59
- Number of suites: 11
- Number of restaurants: 1

Website
- Homepage

The Kampala Protea Hotel is a hotel in Kampala, Uganda.

== Location ==
The hotel is located on Elgon Terrace, off of Acacia Avenue, on Kololo Hill, in the Kampala Central Division.

== Overview ==
The establishment, founded in 2007, is a member of the South-African based Protea Hotels Group, owned by the Marriott Hotels chain. In December 2014, the hotel won the award of "Best Luxury City Business Hotel in Uganda" in the World Luxury Hotel Awards contest that year. It had won a similar award in 2013.

According to the Uganda Tourism Board, it is a 4-star hotel.

== Ownership ==
The hotel is a member of the Simba Group of Companies, owned by Ugandan entrepreneur Patrick Bitature, whose business interests span leisure and travel.

== See also ==
- Kampala Capital City Authority
- List of hotels in Uganda
