= Karim Hirji =

Ugandan businessman

- Born: November 11, 1950 (age 75); Uganda
- Citizenship: Uganda
- Occupations: Businessman, entrepreneur
- Years active: 1960s–present
- Title: Capo

Karim Hirji (born 11 November 1950) is a Ugandan businessman, hotel owner and entrepreneur. He is reported to be one of the wealthiest individuals in Uganda, with an estimated net worth of about US$800 million.

== Early life ==
Hirji was born on 11 November 1950. During the 1960s and 1970s, he was a champion automobile racing driver. During the late 1980s and early 1990s, he began trading in textiles and alcoholic beverages from a shop in central Kampala. His first company Dembe Enterprises has since expanded into the Dembe Group of Companies, a conglomerate that includes a radio station, an automobile dealership, a finance and insurance business, an amusement park and the Imperial Hotels Group chain. He also owns the former Uganda Commercial Bank Towers, which he renamed Cham Towers.

== See also ==
- List of hotels in Uganda
- List of tallest buildings in Kampala
