= Lake Victoria Serena Resort =

Hotel in Lweeza, Uganda

- Location within Uganda

General information
- Location: Lweeza, Uganda
- Coordinates: 00°11′55″N 32°35′55″E
- Opening: October 2009
- Owner: Pearl Development Group
- Management: Serena Hotels

Technical details
- Floor count: 4

Other information
- Number of rooms: 124
- Number of suites: 10
- Number of restaurants: 3

Website
- Homepage

Lake Victoria Serena Resort is a 5-star hotel in Lweeza, in Wakiso District, in Uganda, on the shores of Lake Victoria, Africa's largest fresh-water lake.

== Overview ==
Lake Victoria Serena Resort is a 5 star resort hotel operated by the Serena Hotels Group. It is the second property in Uganda, under the Serena brand. The flagship hotel in the country, operated by the group, is the 5-star Kampala Serena Hotel, located on Nakasero Hill, in central Kampala, Uganda's capital city.

Acquired in 2006, Lake Victoria Serena Resort is undergoing expansion and renovations.

== Ownership ==
The Kampala Serena Hotel is owned by a Pearl Development Group, a private company, and is managed by the Serena Hotels Group.

== See also ==
- List of hotels in Uganda
