= Patrick Bitature =

Ugandan businessman and entrepreneur

Doctor Patrick Bitature
- Born: 10 May 1960 (age 66); Fort Portal, Uganda
- Citizenship: Uganda
- Education: Namasagali College (East African Certificate of Education); Nyakasura School (East African Advanced Certificate of Education); Institute of Chartered Secretaries and Administrators (Fellow); United Graduate College and Seminary International (Honorary Doctorate)
- Occupations: Chairman; 1. Umeme Limited; 2. Electromaxx Uganda; 3. Private Sector Foundation Uganda
- Years active: 1990s–present
- Known for: Simba Group, Investments, business
- Website: Home Page

Patrick Bitature is a Ugandan businessman, entrepreneur and author. He is one of the wealthiest people in Uganda. Patrick is the founder, chairman and Group CEO of the Simba Group of Companies which is primarily based in East Africa. The Simba Group of Companies started in 1998 with the flagship telecom business but has since grown to a conglomerate of East Africa-based companies spanning telecoms, properties, power generation, agro-business, mining, tourism and media. At the end of 2011, the group employed over 600 direct staff and 1,500 indirect staff.

He sits on the management boards of various companies, businesses and foundations in Uganda. Most notable among these appointments include Umeme Uganda Limited, Bolloré Logistics Uganda as well as Mulago National Referral Hospital.

In November 2022, he was named entrepreneur of the year at the African tourism leadership forum in Botswana, Gaborone.

== Early life and education ==
Bitature was born on 10 May 1960 in Fort Portal, Kabarole District in the Western Region of Uganda. He was the first born in a middle-class family. When he was 13 years old, his father was murdered during the Idi Amin regime. He then became the breadwinner, trading in sugar, clothing, shoes, and foreign currencies. Later, he expanded into mobile telephones and mobile airtime distribution. Bitature attended Namasagali College in Kamuli District for his O-Level education. While there, he was mentored by Fr. Damien Grimes. He later attended Nyakasura School in Fort Portal, Kabarole District for his A-Level education. He then studied at the London School of Accountancy in the United Kingdom. He then joined the Institute of Chartered Secretaries and Administrators. He holds the rank of fellow of the institute. In 2013, he was awarded an honorary doctorate degree by the United Graduate College and Seminary International, based in Asheville, North Carolina.

== Career ==
In 1998, Bitature started a company that he named Simba Telecom Limited. The company became a franchisee of MTN Uganda, which had just opened in the country. Simba Telecom has grown into the largest seller of MTN airtime in Uganda, with gross sales in excess of US$80 million in 2010.

Over the years, he has formed other companies within the Simba Group of Companies, with subsidiaries in Uganda, Kenya, and Tanzania. Some of the companies in the group include the following:

- Simba Telecoms Limited
- Kampala Protea Hotel
- Eletromaxx Limited – Owner-operator of the 70 megawatt Tororo Thermal Power Station
1. Simba Mining Limited
- Simba Dairy Farm
- Tororo Solar Power Station
- Protea Hotel Kampala Marriott Skyz

== Other responsibilities ==
In October 2021, Bolloré transport & logistics appointed Patrick Bitature as new chairman in Uganda.

In September 2021, Bitature was appointed a member of the board for the Mulago National Referral Hospital.

In September 2021, Bitature was appointed chancellor of Uganda Technology and Management University (UTAMU), a private university based in Kampala. His term began on 17 September 2021 and runs until 16 September 2025. Bitature replaced Stephen Kalonzo Musyoka, the former Vice President of Kenya, who served as the founding chancellor of the university for two consecutive terms, from 2013 until 2021.

Bitature was appointed in October 2020 by the Ugandan Minister of Health to the Board of Directors of Malaria Free Uganda, a Private Public Initiative by the Government of Uganda under Ministry of Health which seeks to eliminate Malaria in Uganda by 2030.

Bitature was appointed as the chairman of the Private Sector Foundation Uganda in 2014, which is an umbrella body composed of private sector enterprises and offering lobbying advocacy and training for its members. He has since stepped down from the position.

In September 2013 Bitature stepped down as Chairman Board of Directors, Uganda Investment Authority (UIA). He had held this position from March 2007

Since 2007, he has been the chairman of the board of directors of Umeme, the largest electric energy distributor in Uganda. Since 2009, he has been the chairman of Ndege Premier Aviation Company, a private air charter and aeroplane management company based at Kajjansi Airport.

He has been a member of the board of directors of the Commonwealth Business Council since August 2013.

In October 2007, he was made a member of Traidlinks Limited and appointed the director of the Ugandan chapter. Traidlinks is an Irish, non-profit organisation focused on improving the productivity of subject matter experts and promotes the growth of Public-Private Partnerships.

Since December 2010, he has served as the honorary consul of Australia in Uganda. Since March 2013, he has served as the patron of the Australian Alumni Association Uganda.

== Personal life ==
Bitature is married to Carol Bitature and has four children. Nataliey Bitature is one of his children.

== See also ==
- Uganda Investment Authority
