= Mohammed Hamid (businessman) =

Ugandan investor

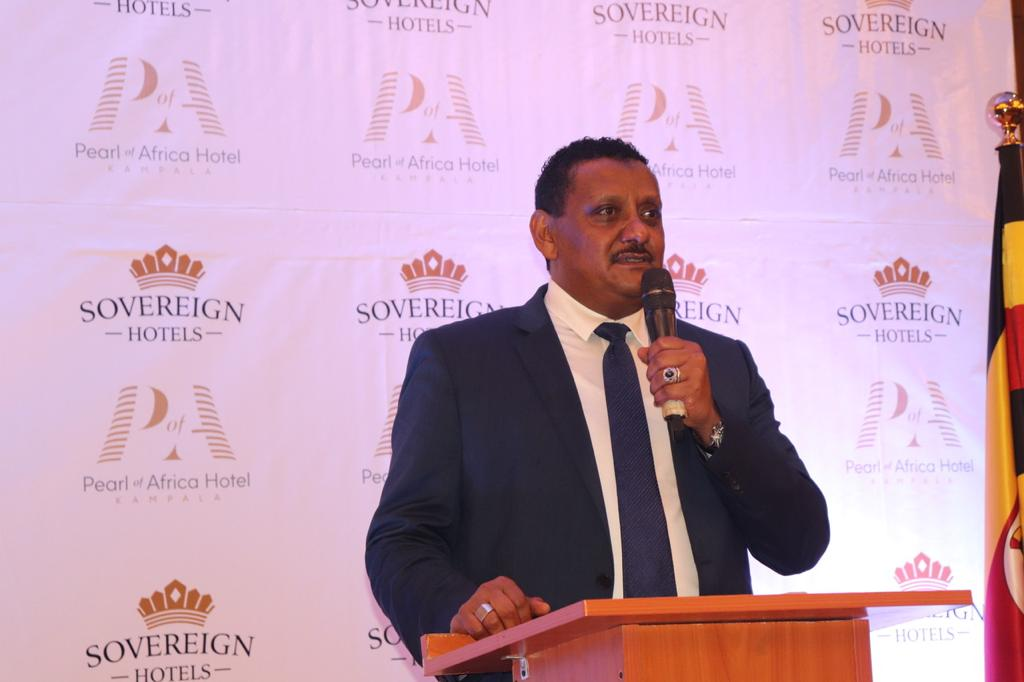
- Born: 1976 (age 49–50); Wau, Sudan
- Education: Makerere University
- Occupations: Businessman, entrepreneur, investor
- Years active: 1987 - present

Mohammed Hamid (born 1976) is a Ugandan businessman born in Wau, Sudan. He is the owner and chairman of the executive board of directors for the Aya Group. He's one of Uganda's crucial industrialists with vast experience in multiple industrial sectors in countries across the globe. He is the founder of Aya Group.

In July 2015, he was reported by Forbes to be one of the richest Ugandans with a net worth of USD200m. The group also has investments in agro-industry.

== Background ==
Hamid was born in the Sudan circa 1976. In 1987, he traveled to Uganda for the first time to visit his elder brother, Mohammed El Hamid, who operated a commodity trading business called Pan Afric Impex. He fell in love with the country and stayed.

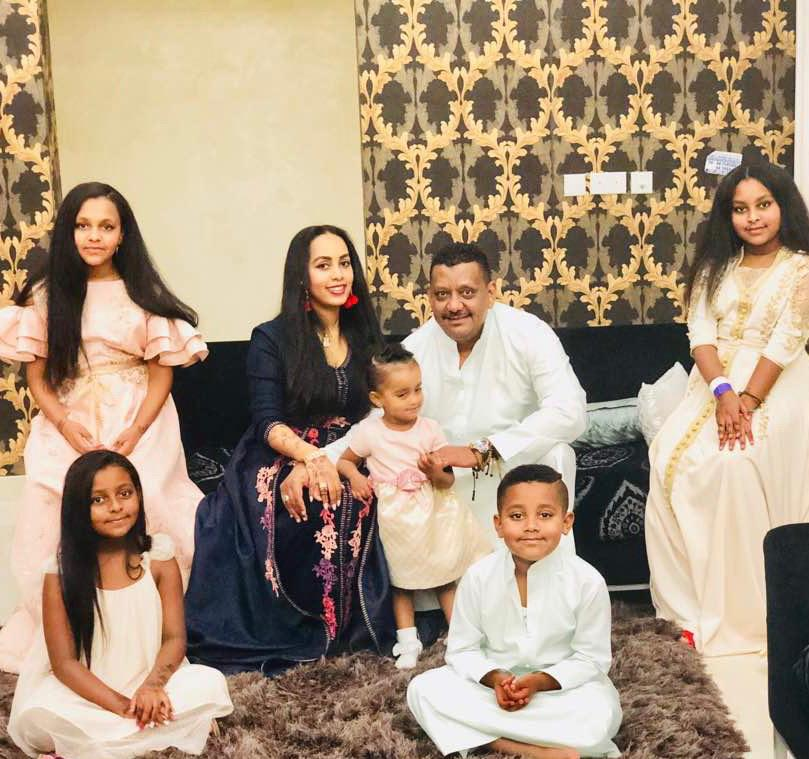
Mohammed Hamid with his family (2019)

The younger Mohammed worked with his elder brother until the early 1990s when he started his first company, Pan Afric Commodities, also a commodities trading business. In 1997, he bought a 15 acres (6.1 ha) piece of land in Kawempe, a suburb of Kampala, where he relocated the machinery and started milling wheat. Later he bought more mills and started baking bread and confectioneries.

Later, he started a trucking business, FIFI Transport Uganda Limited, later renamed Panafric Transport, which is a leading hauler in the East and Central African region", with a current fleet of hundreds of heavy duty Scania and MAN prime movers and semi trailers

. One of his companies, Aya Investments, is the developer of the Pearl of Africa Hotel, launched in 2017 by President Yoweri Museveni. In 2018, Forbes listed Hamid among the 5 young African Millionaires to watch.

== See also ==
- List of banks in Uganda
- Banking in Uganda
