= Imperial Hotels Group =

Hotel conglomerate, based in Uganda

- Company type: Private
- Industry: Hospitality, Tourism
- Headquarters: Kampala, Uganda
- Products: Hotels, Lodges, and Resorts
- Owner: Imperial Hotels Limited
- Website: Group Homepage

Imperial Hotels Group is a hotel conglomerate, based in Uganda, with operations in Kampala and Entebbe. The Group is privately owned, with substantial ownership in the hands of Karim Hirji, one of the wealthiest individuals in Uganda.

== Overview ==
As of July 2014, the group consists of the following properties:

Kampala, Uganda

- Imperial Royale Hotel
- Grand Imperial Hotel
- Equatoria Shopping Mall

Entebbe, Uganda

- Imperial Resort Beach Hotel
- Imperial Botanical Beach Hotel
- Imperial Golf View Hotel

== See also ==
- Uganda Hotels
- Karim Hirji
