= Hotel Equatoria =

Building in Uganda

- Interactive map of the Hotel Equatoria area

General information
- Location: William Street, Kampala, Uganda
- Coordinates: 00°19′05″N 32°34′25″E
- Owner: Imperial Hotels Group

Other information
- Number of rooms: 89
- Number of restaurants: 3 (Indian, Italian & African)
- Number of bars: 3

Hotel Equatoria was a hotel in Kampala, the capital of Uganda, the third-largest economy in the East African Community. It was a member of the Imperial Hotels Group.

== Location ==
The hotel was located on the corner of William Street and Kyaggwe Road, in the heart of Kampala's central business district. Adjacent landmarks include the PostBank House, across the street on William Street, Kampala Pentecostal Church, on Kyaggwe Road and Sun City Shopping Arcade, on Kampala Road. The coordinates of the hotel were: 0°19'05.0" N, 32°34'25.0" E (latitude: 0.318056; longitude: 32.573611).

== Overview ==
Centrally located within the business and commercial center of Kampala city, Hotel Equatoria had a total of eighty nine rooms, including: twenty four Standard Rooms, forty Deluxe Rooms, twenty four Executive Rooms and one Family Room. Each room had central air-conditioning, an in-room electronic safe and mini-bar, a work desk and Video and Satellite Television. The hotel also had a subterranean, air-conditioned discotheque.

== Recent developments ==
In December 2009, the owners of the hotel transformed it into a shopping mall, with 700 separate shops; (Equatoria Shopping Mall).

== Ownership ==
The shopping mall is a member of the Imperial Hotels Group.

== See also ==
- Kampala Capital City Authority
- Nakasero
- Kampala
- Kampala Central Division
- List of hotels in Uganda
