= Acholi Inn =

Acholi Inn Hotel
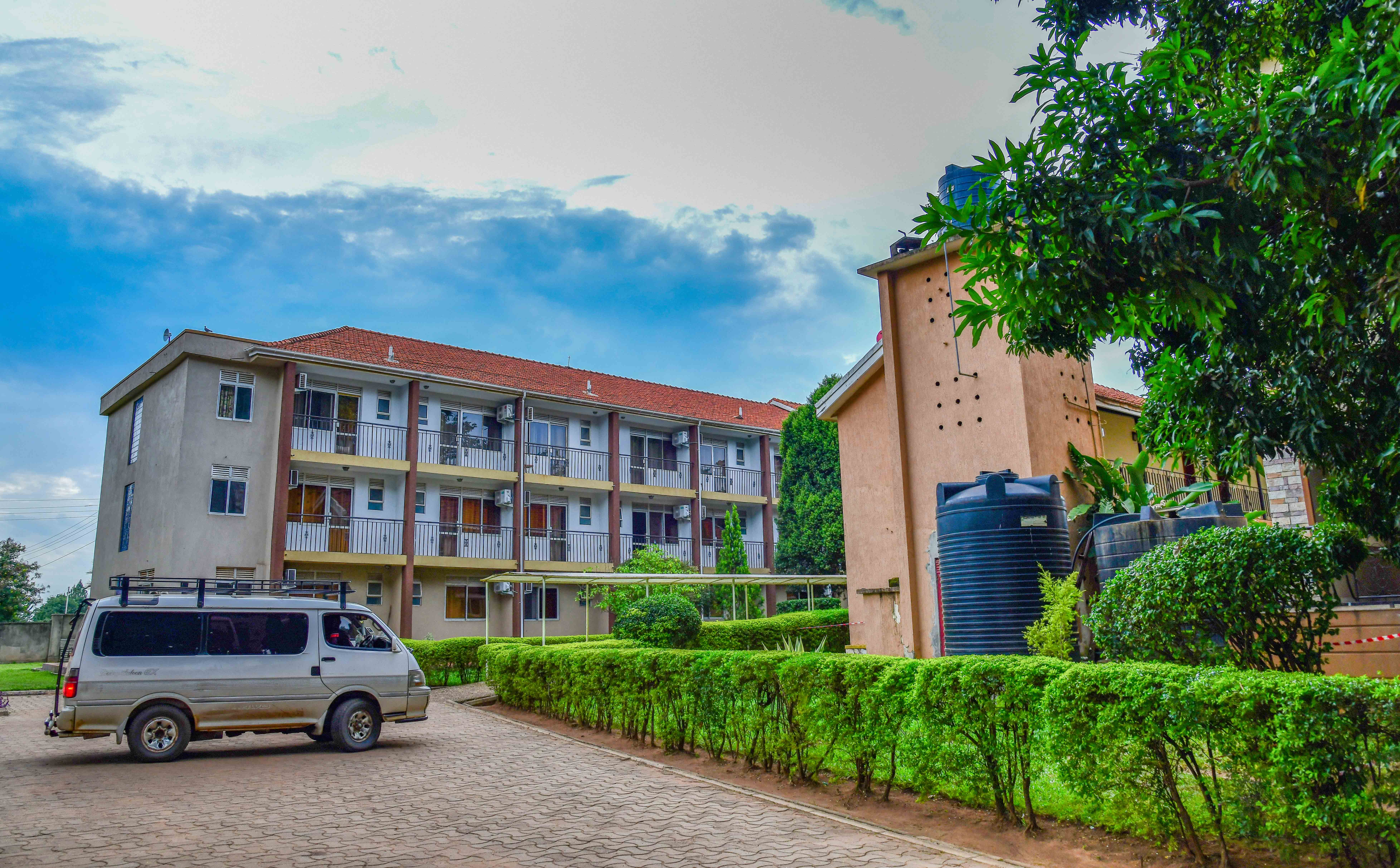

General information
- Location: 4-6 Elizabeth Road; Gulu, Uganda
- Coordinates: 02°46′53″N 32°17′52″E
- Opening: 1936

Other information
- Number of rooms: 80
- Number of suites: 12

Website
- https://acholinn.com/

Acholi Inn is a hotel in Gulu, the largest city in Northern Uganda.

== Location ==
The hotel is located in the heart of Gulu, at 6/4 Elizabeth Road, approximately 2 kilometres (1.2 mi), north of the central business district of the town. The coordinates of Acholi Inn are:2°46'53.0"N, 32°17'52.0"E (Latitude:2.781389; Longitude:32.297778).

== History ==
The hotel was built during Uganda's colonial era and was commissioned by the British in 1936. At Independence in 1962, it was one of about a dozen hotels that constituted Uganda Hotels Limited, a government parastatal during the Obote I regime. In 1995, the hotel was privatized and has undergone refurbishment.

== Ownership ==
As of July 2014, Acholi Inn is privately owned, and detailed shareholding in the establishment is not publicly known.

== Amenities ==
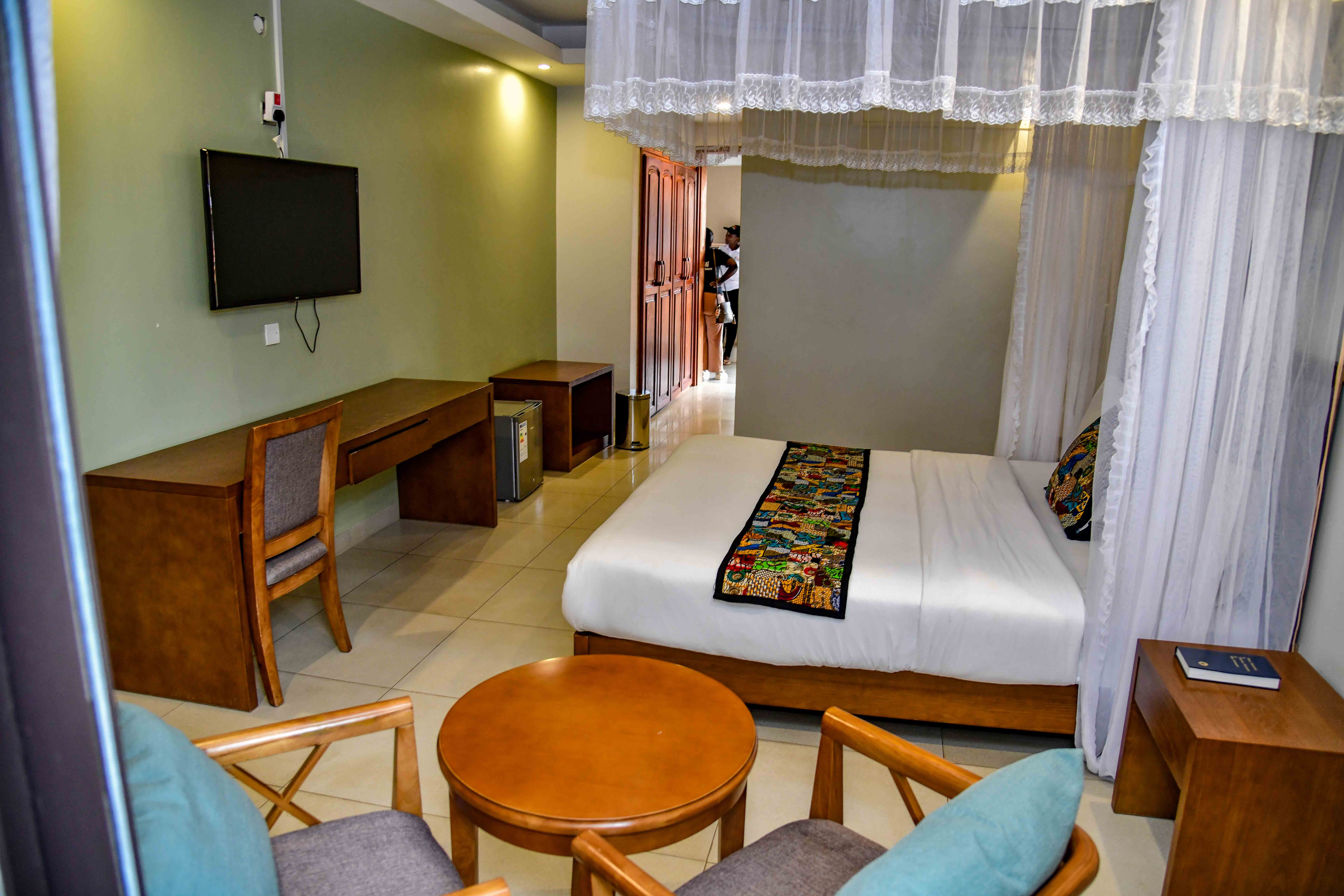
View of a hotel room

Acholi Inn has 120 regular rooms, 12 VIP suites, a swimming pool, a health club, a gymnasium, a sauna, a steam bath, and a massage parlour. Its main conference room can accommodate up to 1,000 guests. It also has an Internet café, a restaurant, a cocktail bar, satellite television and air conditioning.

== See also ==
- Uganda Hotels
- Gulu District
