= Mohammed Alibhai =

Ugandan businessman

- Born: Uganda
- Citizenship: Uganda
- Occupations: Businessman and entrepreneur
- Years active: 1990–present
- Known for: Wealth, security guards, real estate investments

Mohammed Alibhai is a businessman in Uganda. According to a 2007 published report in the New Vision newspaper, he was one of the wealthiest individuals in Uganda.

== Businesses and investments ==
His holdings include establishments providing security guards for individuals and businesses, and real estate investments.
