= The Pearl of Africa Hotel Kampala =

Ugandan hotel

Pearl of Africa Hotel
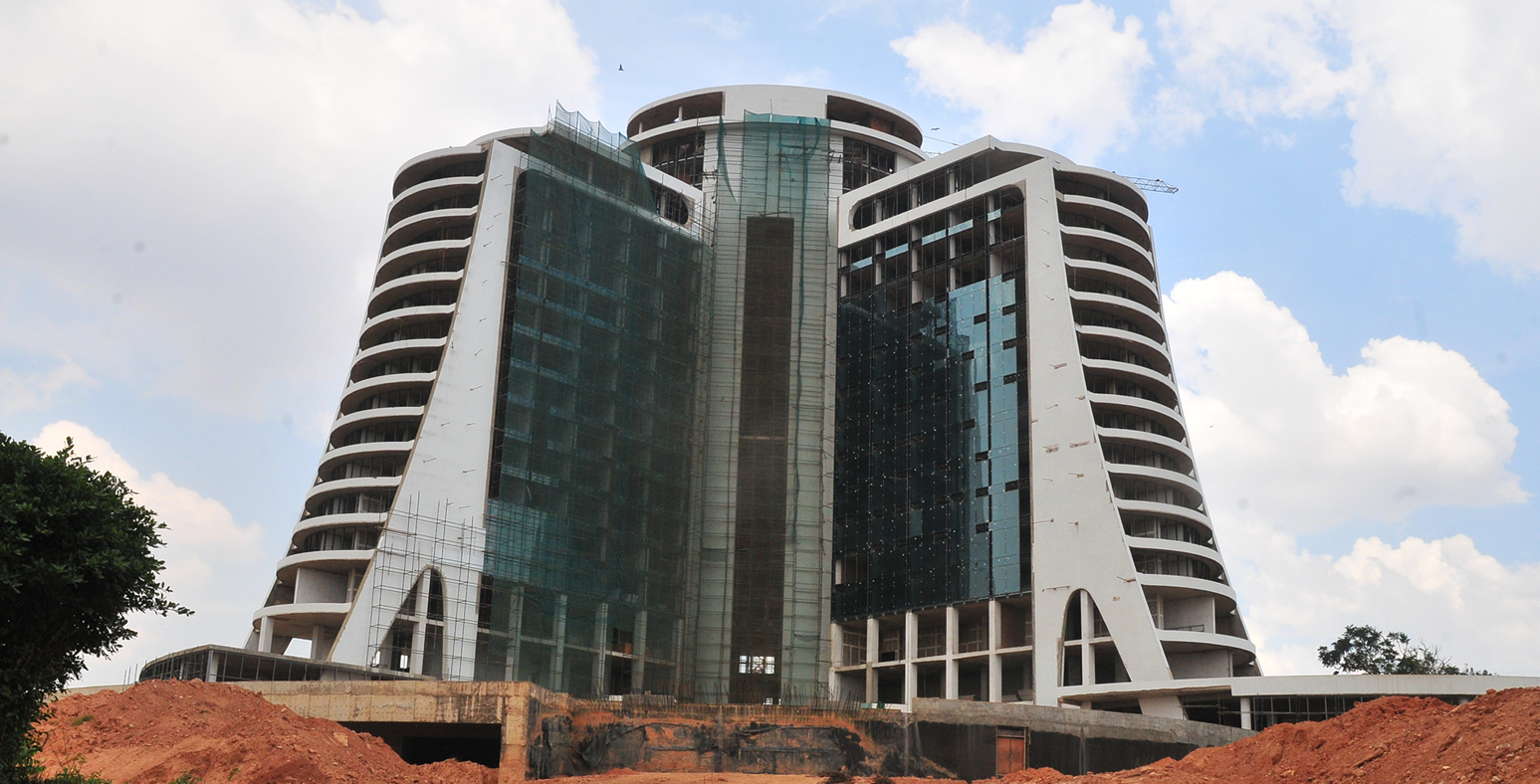

- Map of Kampala showing the location of The Pearl of Africa Hotel Kampala.

General information
- Location: Kampala, Uganda
- Coordinates: 00°19′25″N 32°34′43″E
- Opening: 1 October 2017.
- Owner: Aya Investments Limited
- Operator: Sovereign Hotels Group

Technical details
- Floor count: 24
- Floor area: 32,000 square metres (340,000 ft^{2})

Other information
- Number of rooms: 296
- Number of suites: 37
- Number of restaurants: 5

Website
- Homepage

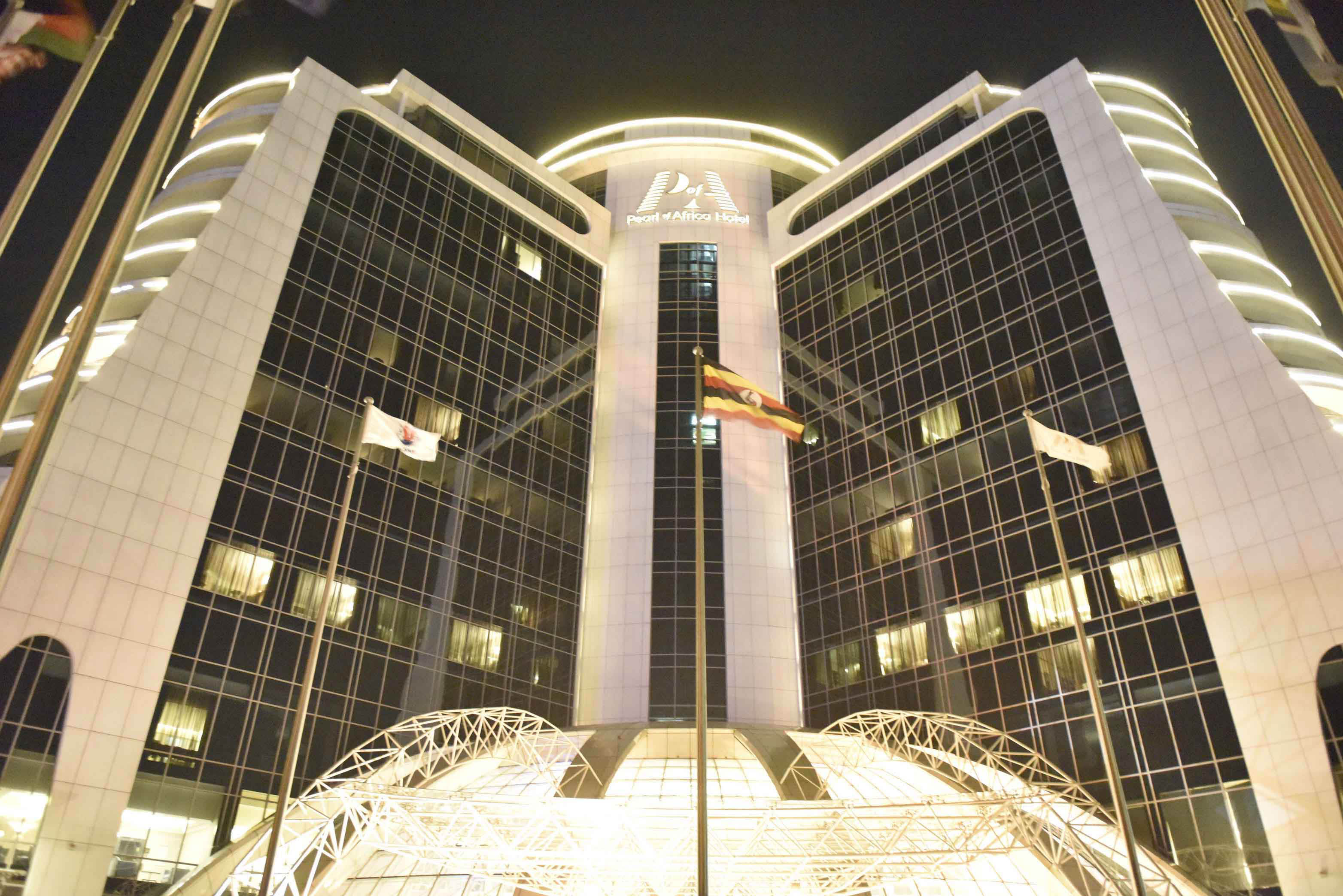
Pearl of Africa Hotel in Kampala.

The Pearl of Africa Hotel is a hotel in Kampala, the capital and largest city of Uganda. The building, under development since 2006, was completed in June 2017, and was opened on 1 October 2017.

== Location ==
The hotel is located in Central Kampala on Nakasero Hill. The building stands on a 14 acres (5.7 ha) site that was previously occupied by the state's television stations. The elevation of the site is approximately 1,240 metres (4,070 ft) above sea level, making it one of the highest points in the city.

== Overview ==
Aya Investments Limited, a subsidiary of the Aya Group, has been working on the 24-story building since 2006. Because of cash shortages and administrative difficulties, the hotel took much longer to complete, with many missed deadlines and multiple postponements of the opening date. Since completion, it is one of the tallest completed buildings in the city, at 23 stories and about 90 metres (300 ft) in height. The building was originally developed under the Hilton Hotels brand. However, when the owners of the hotel failed to reach a licensing agreement with Hilton, the latter signed up with Carlson Rezidor Hotel Group in January 2017. In June 2017 the Carlson Rezidor Hotel Group withdrew from the management agreement. In September 2017 a South African hotel brand, Sovereign Hotels, entered into a short term management agreement with the owners and opened the hotel in October 2017.

== Construction costs ==
As of April 2012, the total construction bill for the property was estimated at US$150 million (UGX:350 billion), according to Aya Group Chairman Mohammed Hamid. In September 2017, the New Vision (newspaper) reported that the Aya Group had invested USh1.75 trillion (US$300 million), into this project.

== Other developments ==
In February 2011, a restaurant kitchen design firm based in Philadelphia, Pennsylvania, United States, was awarded the contract to design the food and beverage services of the hotel, including a sports bar, lobby lounge and bar, banquet facility, bakery, staff canteen, pool bar, coffee shop, and a specialty restaurant. In June 2013, the Aya Group appointed FEBC International, a global hospitality, procurement, and project management company, to act as "Procurement Management Consultant for Operating Supplies and Equipment" (OS&E) services for the hotel. In December 2013, the Hilton Hotels & Resorts denied rumors that they had pulled out of the deal with the Aya Group due to construction delays. They instead reiterated that they are working closely with the owners to complete the construction and open the franchise to the public.

== New partners ==
In September 2017, one month before the opening, the New Vision (newspaper) reported that the Aya Group, who own the hotel, had contracted with the Sovereign Hotels Group, a South Africa - based hotel management company, for the latter to manage the business.

In September 2018, Forbes.com reported that the owners of the hotel had hired Wyndham Hotels & Resorts of the United States to manage the US$300 million 5-star establishment, effective October 2018.

== See also ==
- Kampala Capital City Authority
- Kampala Serena Hotel
- List of tallest buildings in Kampala
