= Nataliey Bitature =

Ugandan entrepreneur and executive (born 1989)

- Born: 28 October 1989 (age 36); London, United Kingdom
- Citizenship: Ugandan
- Education: Hult International Business School; Keele University
- Occupation: Chief of Staff The Simba Group
- Known for: Forbes 30 Under 30

Nataliey Bitature (born 28 October 1989) is a Ugandan entrepreneur and executive who is Chief of Staff at The Simba Group. Bitature was named in a Forbes 30 Under 30 list in 2015 and is the daughter of Patrick Bitature, one of the richest people in Uganda.

== Early life and education ==
Nataliey was born on 28 October 1989 to Patrick Bitature and Carol Bitature.

She earned her undergraduate degree in Business Management and Education Studies at Keele University from 2010–2013. In 2014, Nataliey then joined the London School of Business and Finance (LSBF) for Emerging Leaders Programme which lasted four months and subsequently obtained a Master’s in Social Entrepreneurship at Hult International Business School (from 2015–2016).

== Career ==
Bitature worked as a Chief Business Development Officer at Tateru Properties, an intern in Investment Banking at Stanbic Bank Uganda Limited, Uganda, and as a Business Development Associate Chapter Ten, Uganda.

Bitature, Keisuke Kubota and Manon Lavaud co-founded Musana Carts in San Francisco (Musana means 'Sunlight' in her native language, Runyakitara). The company provides street vendors with solar-powered carts. The main market is Ugandan street food traders, who are about 80% women according to Bitature. The street carts are equipped with a battery backup and light, so they can be used at night. Musana Carts has a relationship with Kampala Capital City Authority and all carts are pre-registered to legally operate within the city. The company offers microfinancing services for those who cannot afford to buy a cart outright, as well as training on food processing and safety. Each carts costs about $400.

Nataliey Bitature is the Chief of Staff of Protea Hotel Naguru, Skyz.

Nataliey also co-founded two service businesses in Kampala.

== Additional affiliations and memberships ==
Bitature is the director of Project 500K, which is a youth empowerment programme aimed at helping young Ugandans become entrepreneurs.

== Awards and achievements ==
The World Economic Forum named Bitature as one of the Top 5 African Innovators in 2016. Bitature was a top contender for a US $1 million prize in the Hultz prize competition. Nataliey was named among Forbes 30 Under 30 in 2018. She also won a Young Achievers Award in 2018 for the Business category.

== Personal life ==
Bitature holds both British and Ugandan citizenship.
