= List of tallest buildings in Kampala =

There are over 15 buildings in Kampala, the capital of Uganda, with 10 or more stories in height. This list ranks Kampala skyscrapers, based on standard height measurement. This includes spires and architectural details but does not include antenna masts. An equal sign (=) following a rank indicates the same height between two or more buildings. The "Year" column indicates the year in which a building was completed or is expected to be completed.

== Completed ==
Was the tallest building in Kampala upon completion

Rank	Name	Image	Height m/ft	Floors	Year	Notes
1	Kampala Intercontinental Hotel			34	2012	Kampala Intercontinental Hotel is located on Nakasero Hill, the most prestigious location in Kampala, the capital of Uganda and the largest city in that country. The piece of property where Kampala Intercontinental Hotel is located is bordered by Nile Avenue to the north, Yusuf Lule Road to the east and De Winton Road to the south.)
1	The Pearl of Africa Hotel Kampala		—N/a	24	2017	Constructed between 2006 and 2017, this hotel is located on top of Nakasero Hill, which measures 1,240 metres (4,070 ft) above sea level, at the base of The Pearl of Africa Hotel Kampala. As of November July 2017, the hotel which was initially developed under the Hilton Hotels brand, features a 740 square metres (7,965 sq ft) ballroom, nine meeting rooms, two boardrooms and a business centre.
2	Uganda Revenue Authority Tower		—N/a	22	2019	Constructed between 2015 and 2019, this skyscraper houses the headquarters and main offices of the Uganda Revenue Authority, the government agency responsible for collection of public taxes. The high-rise development accommodates a maximum of 1,700 employees and has parking for 1,070 automobiles, 360 of them underground. URA House (URA Tower) was constructed at a cost of US$38 million (UGX:139 billion). Usable space inside this building measures 26,000 square metres (279,862 sq ft).
3	Workers' House		—N/a	20	2001	This building currently serves as the headquarters of the National Social Security Fund
4	Crested Towers: Tall Tower		—N/a	20	1970	Crested Towers is owned by National Housing & Construction Company Limited, the largest construction company in Uganda, and the government construction company. The building has two towers - Tall Tower and Short Tower. It houses various tenants, including Stanbic Bank Uganda Limited and the North Tower also houses the Offices of the Delegation of the European Union in Uganda
5	Mapeera House		—N/a	19	2012	The building is owned by the catholic Church in Uganda and houses the headquarters and main branch of Centenary Bank, the second-largest indigenous commercial bank in Uganda also owned by the catholic Church]
6	Uganda House		—N/a	16	1980	Owned and operated by the Milton Obote Foundation, a private, for-profit organisation. The building houses the national headquarters of the Uganda People's Congress (UPC), one of Uganda's political parties.
7	Cham Towers		—N/a	16	1979	The building was formerly owned by Uganda Commercial Bank (UCB) and was known as UCB House. In the mid-2000s, UCB was acquired by Standard Bank of South Africa, and transformed into Stanbic Bank Uganda. UCB House was sold to real-estate mogul, Karim Hirji and renamed Cham Towers.
8	Janani Luwum Church House		—N/a	15	2018	Budgeted at approximately UGX:40.75 billion (US$16.3 million), delays and overruns pushed the final cost higher. The 15 story building is owned by the Church of Uganda. Construction began in 2011 and is concluded in June 2018. Seventy percent financing was provided by Equity Bank (Uganda), in form of a mortgage.
9	Kampala Sheraton Hotel		—N/a	14	1965	Opened as the Apollo Hotel in 1965, the building has changed names many times. In 1999, Middle Eastern investors won the rights to lease the hotel from the Government of Uganda and manage it for the next 25 years. The investors won a franchise from Sheraton Hotels and Resorts to use the Sheraton name on the establishment.
10	Diamond Trust Building		—N/a	14	1970	Completed in the 1970s, the building serves as the headquarters of Diamond Trust Bank Uganda.
11	Imperial Royale Hotel		—N/a	14	2007	A member of the Imperial Hotels Group, this hotel served as the media center during the 2007 Commonwealth Heads of Government Meeting, held in Kampala, Uganda.
12	Crested Towers: Short Tower		—N/a	12	1970	Crested Towers is owned by National Housing & Construction Company Limited, the Largest Construction Company in Uganda also the Government construction Company. The building has two Towers - Tall Tower and Short Tower. It houses various tenants including Stanbic Bank Uganda Limited.
13	DFCU House		—N/a	10	2013	The building houses the headquarters of DFCU Group and the main branch of DFCU Bank. Underground and surface parking is available, as well as rentable, retail, and office space on several levels. As of June 2014, the construction was complete and occupancy was expected to take place in the second half of 2014. The building was officially dedicated as open in September 2015.
14	Rwenzori Towers		—N/a	10	2011	Rwenzori Towers was developed between 2008 and 2012. It contains approximately 12,000 square metres (130,000 ft^{2}) of office space and about 3,000 square metres (32,000 ft^{2}) of retail space, arranged around a self-contained courtyard with water features. About 400 individual car parking spaces are incorporated in the development. Rwenzori Towers, together with Rwenzori Courts, which was developed in the early 2000s, comprise the Rwenzori Complex.
15	Course View Towers		—N/a	10	2007	Constructed at an estimated cost of US$20 million, the skyscraper sits on 1 acre (0.40 ha) of land and has enough space underground to accommodate 250 parked vehicles.
16	Amamu House		—N/a	10	2001	Contains rentable office and retail space.
17	Communications House		—N/a	16	1999	Owned and operated by Uganda Communications Commission.
18	IPS Building		41.45 metres (136.0 ft)	10	1972	Owned and operated by Industrial Promotion Services, a subsidiary of the Aga Khan Fund for Economic Development.
19	Twed Towers		—N/a	9	2011	Twed Towers is located at Plot 10 Kafu Road, Nakasero Hill, Kampala Central Division. Total built-up space is 18,000 square metres (190,000 ft^{2}). Parking space ratio at the building is 1 car for every 37 square metres (400 ft^{2}).
20	Munyonyo Martyrs Shrine		47 metres	—N/a	2016	Munyonyo Martyrs Shrine is a one level floor church dedicated to Uganda Martyrs, which groudbreakind took in 2015. The Church was dedicated in 2016 by Pope Francis during his first journey to Africa. Structural height of the church building with the cross placed on twelve phillars is 47 metres.

== Under construction ==
Rank	Name	Image	Height m/ft	Floors	Year	Notes
1	Kampala Intercontinental Hotel		—N/a	34	TBD	Also referred to as Kingdom Hotel Kampala, the development will include a 250-room, 34-story hotel tower, a conference center that can accommodate over 3,000 delegates, parking space for over 1,500 vehicles, and rentable retail and office space measuring in excess of 90,000 square metres (970,000 ft^{2}).
2	Pension Towers		155 (509 ft)	32	2026	Under construction since 2008, the office complex consists of three interconnected towers; one central tower of 32 stories in height, flanked on either side by a ten-story tower. Office space in all three towers will measure in excess of 75,000 square metres (810,000 ft^{2}). Parking for over 500 vehicles will be provided in the development.
3	Movement House		—N/a	27	2016	Movement House is under construction in Kampala's central business district, adjacent to the Crested Towers North & South and across the street from the Kampala Intercontinental Hotel. The 27 storey structure will house the party headquarters of the National Resistance Movement, the ruling political party in Uganda since 1986. It will also contain rentable residential and office space, as well as a shopping mall, movie theatres, restaurants, a roof garden, and bank offices. The preliminary construction costs are estimated at UGX:30 billion.

== Proposed ==
Rank	Name	Image	Height m/ft	Floors	Year	Notes
1	Kampala Tower		300 metres (980 ft)	60	TBD	According to a published report in 2012, the Kampala Tower was in the concept stage. The architects for the project have handed the drawings to the government of Uganda for approval. If constructed, the skyscraper would become the tallest building in Africa.

== See also ==
- List of tallest buildings in Africa
- List of tallest buildings in the world
