= Grand Imperial Hotel =

Hotel in Kampala, Uganda

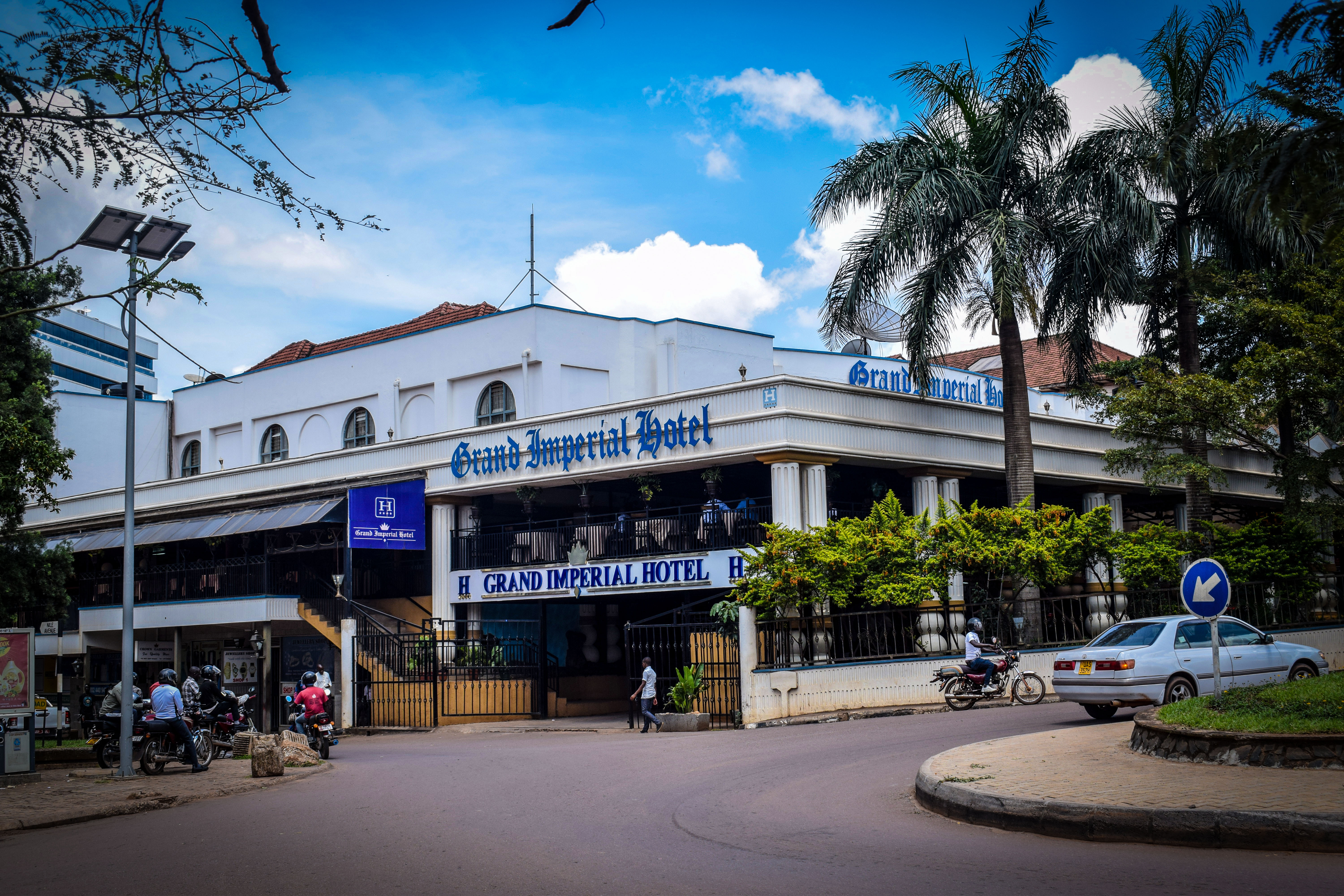

- Location within Uganda

General information
- Location: Speke Road, just behind bank of Uganda, the central bank of the country Kampala, Uganda
- Coordinates: 00°18′54″N 32°34′51″E

Other information
- Number of rooms: 103
- Parking: available and spacious

Website
- Homepage

The Grand Imperial Hotel is a hotel in Kampala, the capital and largest city of Uganda.

The Grand Imperial was one of the first hotels to be built in colonial Uganda in the early 20th century. It has 103 guest rooms, a swimming pool, two restaurants, two bars, a shopping arcade, and a gymnasium.

The hotel is located on Speke Road, on Nakasero Hill, in the heart of Kampala's central business district. Adjacent landmarks include the East African Development Bank, the Bank of Uganda, the Kampala Sheraton Hotel, and the Ugandan headquarters of Standard Chartered Bank.

The hotel is a member of the Imperial Hotels Group, which has three hotels in Kampala and three in Entebbe.
