= Kampala Serena Hotel =

Hotel in Kampala, Uganda

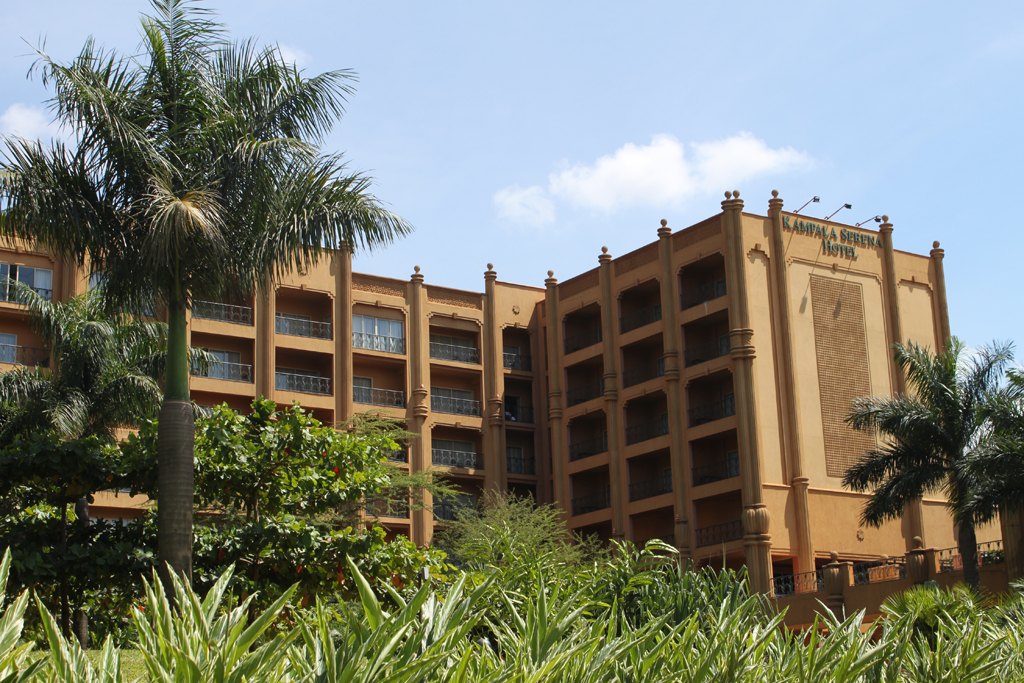

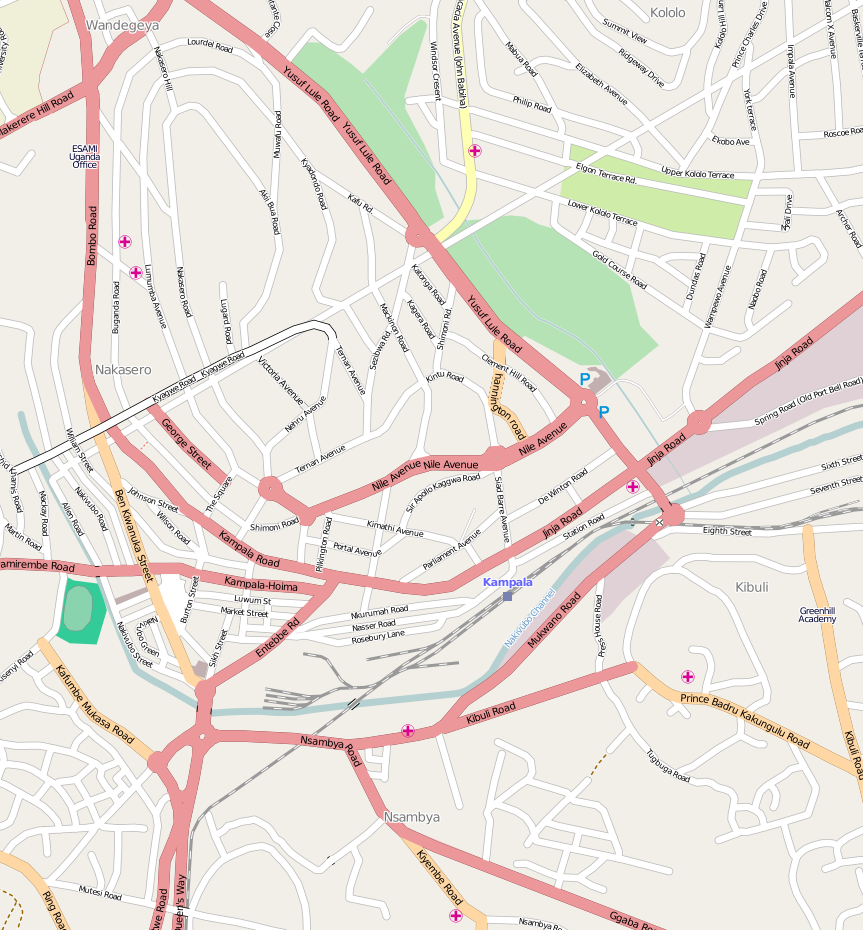
- Location within Kampala

General information
- Location: Kampala, Uganda
- Coordinates: 00°19′08″N 32°35′11″E
- Opening: 31 July 2006
- Operator: Serena Hotels

Technical details
- Floor count: 7

Other information
- Number of rooms: 139
- Number of suites: 13
- Number of restaurants: 3

Website
- Homepage

The Kampala Serena Hotel is a hotel in Kampala, the capital and largest city of Uganda. The hotel is rated 5 stars by the Uganda Tourism Board.

== Location ==
The hotel is on Kintu Road on Nakasero Hill, in the centre of Kampala. The hotel is nestled among 17 acres (6.9 ha) of lawns and gardens. The hotel is adjacent to the Kampala Sheraton Hotel and the Imperial Royale Hotel. It is in the Kampala Central Division, one of the five administrative divisions of the city. The coordinates of the Kampala Serena Hotel are 0°19'08.0"N, 32°35'11.0"E (Latitude:0.318889; Longitude:32.586400).

== Overview ==
The hotel opened on 31 July 2006, after eighteen months of renovations and refurbishment at a cost of US$30.5 million. The hotel is part of the Serena Hotels Group. It has 152 rooms, including thirteen suites, one of which is a presidential suite.

During the Commonwealth Heads of Government Meeting 2007 in Kampala, the hotel hosted Queen Elizabeth II of the United Kingdom for four nights.

The hotel has its own helipad for easy transport between the hotel and Entebbe International Airport. Adjacent to the hotel is the Kampala Serena International Conference Center with a seating capacity of 1,500 and multilingual translation facilities of up to nine languages simultaneously.

In 2016, the hotel was expanded, with the addition of 32 bedrooms, and the improvement of food, beverage, and meeting facilities.

== History ==
=== International Conference Center at Serena Hotel ===
The International Conference Center at Serena Hotel was constructed in 1975 in order to host 13th Summit of the Organization of African Unity (OAU). The hexagonal building was completed by Energoprojekt holding from Non-Aligned Socialist Federal Republic of Yugoslavia. The venue was subsequently used by Idi Amin regime for the president's personal activities and, according to some sources, for torture of Amin's opponents and enemies.

== Ownership ==
The Kampala Serena Hotel is owned by a consortium that includes three corporate entities: Tourism Promotion Services, a division of the Aga Khan Fund for Economic Development; the Uganda National Social Security Fund; and Proparco, a French property investment company. The table below summarizes the shareholding in the business.

Kampala Serena Hotel stock ownership
Rank	Name of owner	Percentage ownership
1	Tourism Promotion Services	60.0
2	National Social Security Fund	20.0
3	PROPARCO	20.0
	Total	100.0

== Renovations ==
In March 2016, the hotel began renovations that were to "create 36 new residential rooms, a new state-of-the-art suite, partial refurbishment and alterations of the meeting rooms and create more executive lounges and meeting rooms". The US$8 million expansion was partly funded by PROPARCO of France and was expected to last 12 months.

== See also ==
- Kampala Capital City Authority
- Kampala Central Division
- Lake Victoria Serena Resort
