= Sheraton Kampala Hotel =

Hotel in Kampala, Uganda

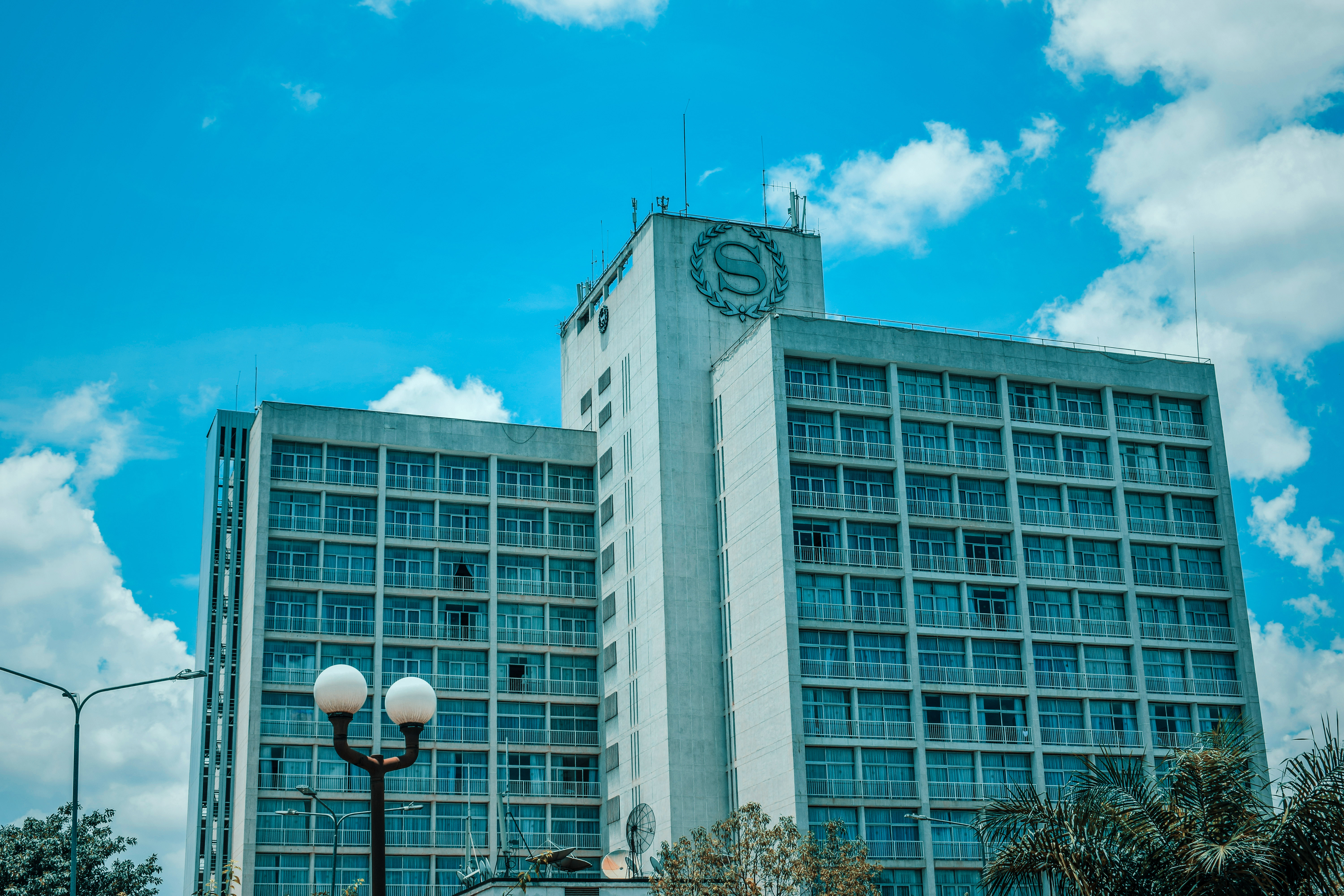

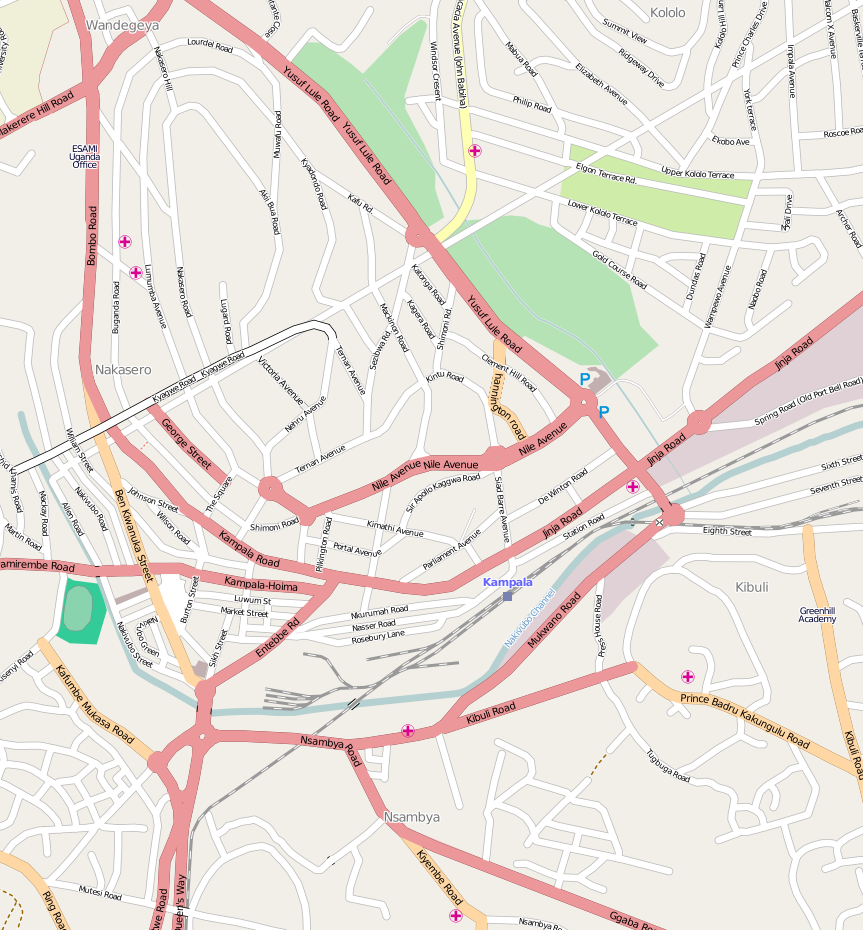
- Location within Kampala

General information
- Location: Uganda
- Coordinates: 00°19′00″N 32°35′01″E
- Opening: October 8, 1967
- Operator: Constellation Hospitality Group

Technical details
- Floor count: 14

Other information
- Number of rooms: 233

The Sheraton Kampala Hotel is a hotel in Kampala, the capital of Uganda and its largest city. It is one of the three Five star hotels in Kampala, as rated by the Uganda Tourism Board in June 2015.

== Location ==
The hotel sits on the southwestern slopes of Nakasero Hill, an upscale neighborhood in Kampala Central Division. The coordinates of the hotel are:0°19'00.0"N, 32°35'01.0"E (Longitude:0.316667; Latitude:32.583611).

== History ==
The hotel opened on October 8, 1967 as the Apolo Hotel. The hotel's opening was attended by its namesake, Prime Minister Apollo Milton Obote. When Obote was overthrown in a military coup by Idi Amin in 1971, the hotel was renamed the Kampala International Hotel. Following the overthrow of Amin by Tanzanian forces, who made the hotel their headquarters, and the Uganda National Liberation Army in 1979, and the return to power of Obote in 1980, the hotel reverted to the Apolo Hotel name. The National Resistance Movement government, which came into power in 1986, liberalized the economy. In 1987, a group of Middle Eastern investors won the right to lease the hotel for 25 years from its owners, the Apolo Hotel Corporation Limited, a company fully owned by the government of Uganda. The hotel was extensively refurbished and was renamed the Sheraton Kampala Hotel when it reopened in 1991, as a Sheraton Hotels franchise. A fence separating the hotel compound from the neighbouring Jubilee Park was removed and the park was renamed Sheraton Gardens. The hotel has since had several episodes of major renovations.

== See also ==
- Kampala Capital City Authority
- Kampala District
- List of tallest buildings in Kampala
