= Ministry of Culture Building, Lima =

Building in Lima, Peru

Coordinates: 12.0866°S 77.0017°W

Ministry of Culture
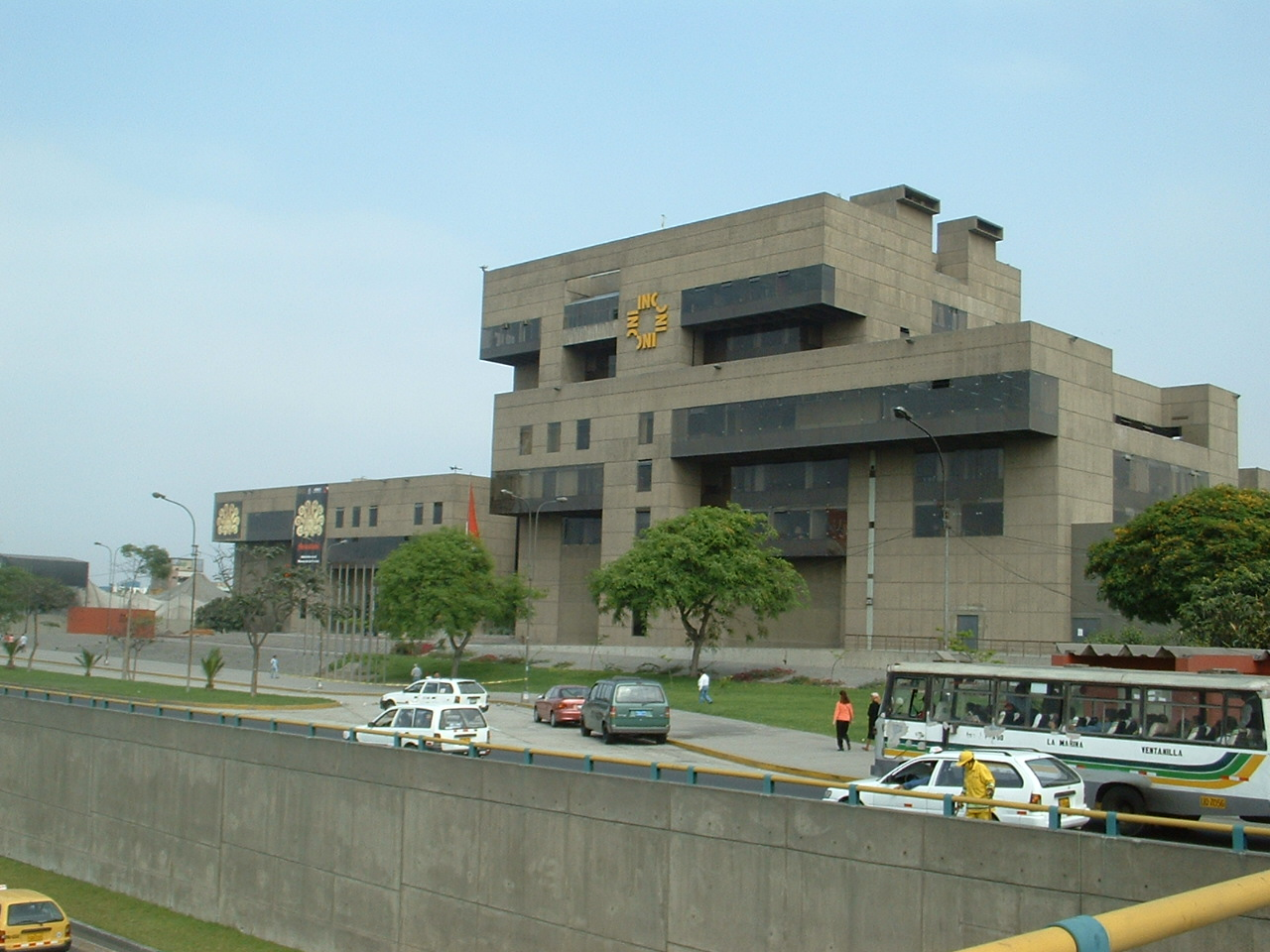
- The building in 2006
- Interactive map of the Ministry of Culture area
- Former names: Museum of the Nation

General information
- Architectural style: Brutalist
- Location: Javier Prado Este 2465
- Year built: 1970–1971
- Owner: Government of Peru

Technical details
- Floor count: 8

Design and construction
- Architects: Miguel Cruchaga Belaúnde; Miguel Rodrigo Mazuré; Emilio Soyer Nash

Cultural Heritage of Peru
- Official name: Sede del Ministerio de Cultura
- Designated: July 19, 2022
- Legal basis: Viceministerial Resolution (Nº 000157-2022-VMPCIC/MC)

The Headquarters of the Ministry of Culture (Spanish: Sede del Ministerio de Cultura) is a government building in the National Cultural Centre, a cultural and artistic hub located in San Borja District, Lima, Peru. Like several other projects promoted by the military government of Juan Velasco Alvarado, the building was constructed in the brutalist style in 1971, the work of architects Miguel Cruchaga Belaúnde, Miguel Rodrigo Mazuré and Emilio Soyer Nash.

The building has seen different uses throughout its history, ultimately serving as the headquarters of the country's Ministry of Culture. In addition to this administrative use, it also hosts UNESCO's field office in Lima and functions as a cultural centre, with theatres and exhibits within its premises. Since 2022, it is a National Monument of Peru.

== History ==
The building was originally planned as an administrative complex which would host the headquarters of the government's fishing ministry. The work of architects Miguel Cruchaga Belaúnde, Miguel Rodrigo Mazuré and Emilio Soyer Nash was chosen as the public contest's winning design, and construction works concluded in 1971. It later functioned as the headquarters of the Bank of the Nation until 1986.

On March 14, 1980, then president Alan García decreed the organisation of a national museum. A project was approved on March 14, 1988, after which the Museum of the Nation was inaugurated on February 19, 1990. In 1996, the National Institute of Culture (INC) moved into the building, and parts of the Ministry of Education moved into the building in 2010. That same year, the INC was incorporated into the Ministry of Culture. In 2009, then director of the museum, Marisol Ginocchio, announced the reopening of the museum using four of the building's floors and expanding its collection to include the country's contemporary history.

The building hosted a number of international summits, including those of the Inter-American Development Bank (2004), the European Union, Latin America and the Caribbean Summit (2008), the 3rd Summit of South American-Arab Countries (2012), and that of the Asia-Pacific Economic Cooperation (2016). The 2012 summit proved controversial, as a number of architects—including Cruchaga—protested the painting of the building's façade. On July 8, 2014, the museum's permanent exhibit was permanently closed in favour of the National Museum of Peru, instead being used for temporary displays. In May 2017, Minister Salvador del Solar announced that the museum would relaunch as a culture centre, but him leaving office stopped the project.

The building has hosted the funerals of several figures of Peruvian society, including those of former president Alberto Fujimori, entertainer Yola Polastri, and comedian Alfonso Mendoza.

== See also ==
- Edificio Petroperú
- Headquarters of the Peruvian Army
- Secretary-General of the Andean Community
- Javier Alzamora Valdez Building
