= Lima Convention Center =

Convention centre in Peru

Coordinates: 12.0872°S 77.0004°W

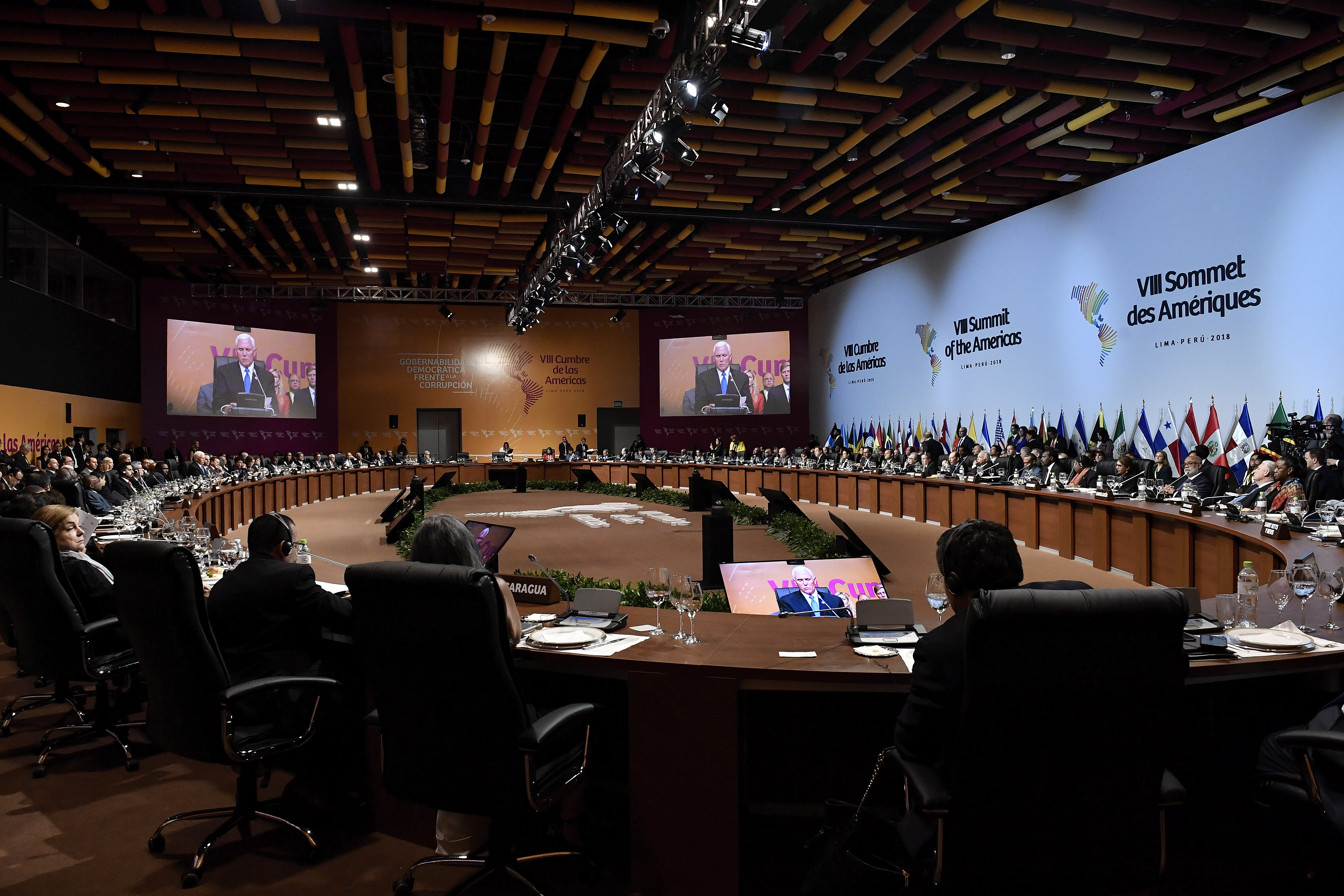
- A convention room in the building during the 8th Summit of the Americas
- Interactive map of the Lima Convention Center area

General information
- Location: San Borja, Lima, Av. Arqueología 160
- Inaugurated: October 1, 2015

Technical details
- Floor count: 10

The Lima Convention Center (Spanish: Lima Centro de Convenciones; LCC), also known as the 27 January Convention Center (Spanish: Centro de Convenciones 27 de Enero) is a convention centre in San Borja, Lima, Peru. It is located in the cultural center of the city of Lima, around the Museo de la Nación and the National Library of Peru, in an area of 10,884 m^{2}. It was inaugurated on October 1, 2015.

The complex has the capacity to accommodate around 10,000 people, has 18 rooms and four levels of basements and 4 floors of an auditorium.

The building hosted the 2016 APEC summit and the 8th Summit of the Americas in 2018, among others.

== See also ==
- Torre Banco de la Nación, located next to the building.
- Sheraton Lima Historic Center, another convention centre in Lima
