= Ministry of Culture (Peru) =

Government ministry of Peru

- Ministerio de Cultura
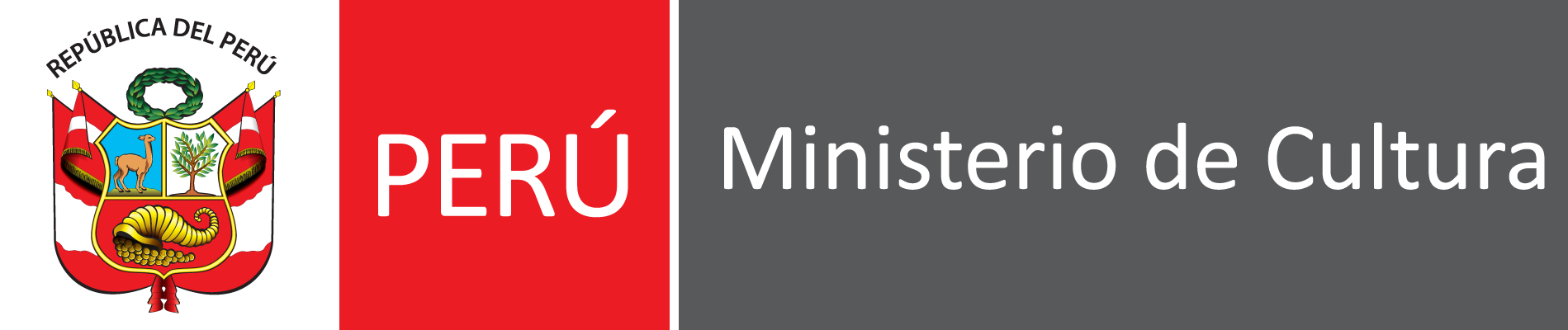
- Logo

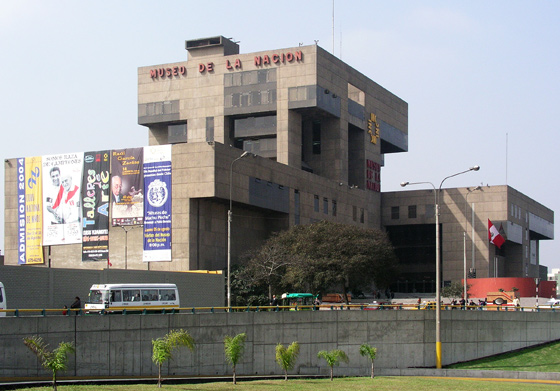
- Headquarters in Lima

Agency overview
- Formed: July 20, 2010
- Preceding agency: National Institute of Culture
- Jurisdiction: Government of Peru
- Headquarters: San Borja, Lima, Peru
- Minister responsible: Alberto Beingolea
- Website: www.cultura.gob.pe

The Ministry of Culture (Spanish: Ministerio de Cultura, MINCUL) is the government ministry of Peru in charge of the promotion of Peruvian culture and identity. It was created on 20 July 2010, during the Second presidency of Alan García. It replaced the National Institute of Culture (Spanish: Instituto Nacional de Cultura, INC), with Juan Ossio Acuña serving as its inaugural minister after his appointment on 4 September 2010.

As of 2026, the culture minister is Alberto Beingolea.

== History ==
=== House of Culture of Peru ===
The House of Culture of Peru (Spanish: Casa de la Cultura del Perú) was created under the government of Ricardo Pérez Godoy in 1962. The following year, Supreme Decree 48 established its headquarters at the Casa de Pilatos, in the historic centre of Lima, which were inaugurated on 24 July after being restored by architect Héctor Velarde Bergmann.

The same year, president Nicolás Lindley López created the National Commission of Culture (Spanish: Comisión Nacional de Cultura, CNC), which was overseen and directed by the head of the House of Culture. In 1965, the CNC was dissolved and the National System for the Promotion of Culture (Spanish: Sistema Nacional de Fomento de la Cultura) was created to absorb all cultural institutions of the Peruvian State, being composed of the Consejo Superior de Fomento de la Cultura, the Casa de la Cultura del Perú, and the houses of culture for each department. The first was formed by the minister of education, a number of cultural directors (those of the National Archive, the National Library, the House of Culture, the National Conservatory of Music, and the National Superior Autonomous School of Fine Arts), and delegates from universities.

All state museums, the National Symphony Orchestra, the National Archaeology Board, and the National Theatre were directly dependent on the House of Culture of Peru, which also had an important bibliography, including the Cultura y pueblo magazine (1964–1970), the Revista peruana de cultura (Lima, 1963–1970), and the Boletín informativo de la Casa de la Cultura del Perú (1964–1969).

=== National Institute of Culture ===
The National Institute of Culture (Spanish: Instituto Nacional de Cultura) was created on 9 March 1971, by the Revolutionary Government as a decentralized public body of the education sector through Supreme Decree 18799, replacing the House of Culture of Peru. The INC's functions were to formulate and execute the policies and strategies of the state in regards to cultural development, cultural conservation, and the diffusion and investigation of affairs related to the country's cultural heritage. The Regulations of the Organization and Functions of the INC were defined by Supreme Decree 027-2001-ED of 20 April 2001.

The INC continued to be based at its predecessor's headquarters until 1996, when it was replaced by the Constitutional Court of Peru. Due to this, it moved to its own building in San Borja District, next to the Museo de la Nación. It had a theatre called the National Theatre of the INC, which was renamed the Grand National Theatre of Peru in 2011. It also published the report Política cultural del Perú, which was printed by UNESCO.

In 1992, the Fund for Culture and the Arts was created by the institute. In 1998, minister Domingo Palermo announced that the INC would become the National Institute of Cultural Heritage (Spanish: Instituto Nacional de Patrimonio Cultural), but this never came to pass.

In 2001, government of Alejandro Toledo created the National Commission of Culture (Spanish: Comisión Nacional de Cultura, chaired by artist and social activist Víctor Delfín and writer and scientist Jose-Carlos Mariátegui (Executive Director). This commission was tasked with preparing the Cultural Policy Guidelines, which outlined the need for the creation of a Ministry of Culture. However, despite repeated public promises during his term, Toledo did not legally formalise its creation, and it was deactivated in 2003.

In mid-2002, it was integrated into the Executive Branch. In 2004, the INC collaborated with IBM to improve its asset registration system. In 2006, a weekly publication focusing on the country's relevant contributions was launched, known as the Gaceta Cultural del Perú.

The ministry was officially dissolved on 1 October 2010, by Supreme Decree 001-2010-MC, being incorporated into the newly-formed ministry three months after its establishment.

Throughout its history, the INC was headed by the following:

- Directors-general:
  - Miguel Oviedo Chamorro (1971–1972)
  - Martha Hildebrandt Pérez-Treviño (1972–1976)
  - Jorge Cornejo Polar (1976–1978)
  - Francisco Abril de Vivero (1978–1980)
  - Ricardo Roca Rey (1980–1981)
  - Luis Enrique Tord Romero (1982–1983)
  - José del Busto Duthurburu (1983–1984)
  - Carlos Ernesto Saavedra Sánchez (1984)
  - Augusto Tamayo Vargas (1984–1985)
  - Fernando Silva Santisteban (1985–1987)
  - Germán Peralta Rivera (1987–1989)
  - Fernando Cabieses Molina (1989–1990)
  - Elías Mújica Barreda (1990)
  - Pedro Gjurinovic Canevaro (1990–1996)
  - Juan Guillermo Carpio Muñoz (1996)
  - Luis Arista Montoya (1996–1999)
  - Luis Repetto Málaga (1999–2000)
  - Luis Enrique Tord Romero (2000–2001)
  - Leonor Cisneros Velarde (2001)
  - Luis Guillermo Lumbreras Salcedo (2002–2006)
  - Cecilia Bákula Buge (2006–2010)
- Executive directors:
  - Abelardo Sánchez León Ledgard (1973–1974)
  - Rodolfo Loayza Saavedra
  - César Urueta Alcántara (1985–1986)
  - Laura Bozzo Rotondo (1989–1990)
  - Ricardo Rivera Martínez
  - Flor de María Valladolid Illescas
  - Gustavo Benza Pfucker (1999–2000)
  - Eduardo Antonio Mazzini Otero (2000–2001)
  - María Elena Córdova Burga (2001–2002)
  - Alejandro Falconi (2002–2006)

=== Ministry of Culture ===
During the Second presidency of Alan García, several bills were introduced in Congress with the aim of creating a Ministry of Culture, eventually being approved. The ministry was formally created through Law 29565 of 2010.

On 12 June 2020, Popular Action Congressman Jorge Vásquez presented a bill suggesting that the headquarters the ministry be moved to Cuzco, the historic capital of the Inca Empire. The following year, during the inauguration of Pedro Castillo, it was suggested that the name be changed (from "Ministry of Culture" to "Ministry of Cultures") and that its headquarters be moved to Government Palace, which ultimately did not happen.

== Organisation ==
- Minister of Culture
- Vice Ministry of Cultural Heritage and Cultural Industries
  - General Directorate of Cultural Heritage
  - General Directorate of Immovable Archaeological Heritage
  - General Directorate of Museums
  - General Directorate of Cultural Industries and the Arts
  - General Directorate for the Protection of Cultural Heritage
  - Directorate of Audiovisual, Phonography, and New Media (DAFO)
- Vice Ministry of Interculturality
  - General Directorate of Intercultural Citizenship
  - General Directorate of Indigenous Peoples' Rights
- Secretary General
- Public prosecutor

== List of ministers ==
	Name	Took office	Left office	Party
1	Juan Ossio Acuña	September 4, 2010	July 28, 2011	Independent
2	Susana Baca de la Colina	July 28, 2011	December 10, 2011	Independent
3	Luis Peirano Falconí	December 11, 2011	July 24, 2013	Independent
4	Diana Álvarez-Calderón Gallo	July 24, 2013	July 28, 2016	Independent
5	Jorge Nieto Montesinos	July 28, 2016	December 5, 2016	Independent
6	Salvador del Solar Labarthe	December 5, 2016	December 27, 2017	Independent
7	Alejandro Neyra Sánchez	January 9, 2018	April 2, 2018	Independent
8	Patricia Balbuena Palacios	April 2, 2018	November 30, 2018	Independent
9	Rogers Valencia Espinoza	December 18, 2018	March 11, 2019	Independent
10	Ulla Holmquist Pachas	March 11, 2019	July 8, 2019	Independent
11	Luis Castillo Butters	July 8, 2019	September 30, 2019	Independent
12	Francesco Petrozzi Franco	October 3, 2019	December 4, 2019	Independent
13	Sonia Guillén Oneeglio	December 7, 2019	May 29, 2020	Independent
14	Alejandro Neyra Sánchez	May 30, 2020	December 10, 2020	Independent
15	María del Carmen de Reparaz Zamora	November 12, 2020	November 17, 2020	Independent
16	Alejandro Neyra Sánchez	November 18, 2020	July 28, 2021	Independent
17	Ciro Gálvez Herrera	July 29, 2021	October 6, 2021	National United Renaissance
18	Gisela Ortiz Perea	October 6, 2021	February 1, 2022	Independent
19	Alejandro Salas Zegarra	February 1, 2022	August 5, 2022	We Are Peru
20	Betssy Chavez Chino	August 5, 2022	November 25, 2022	Democratic Peru
21	Silvana Robles Araujo	November 25, 2022	December 7, 2022	Free Peru
22	Jair Pérez Brañez	December 10, 2022	December 16, 2022	Independent
23	Leslie Urteaga	December 21, 2022	September 3, 2024	Independent
24	Fabricio Valencia Gibaja	September 3, 2024	October 12, 2025	Independent
25	Alfredo Luna	October 14, 2025	February 24, 2026	Independent
26	Fátima Altabás	February 24, 2026	Incumbent	Independent

== See also ==
- Tourism in Peru
- Culture of Peru
- Ministry of Foreign Commerce and Tourism
