= San Borja District =

District in Lima, Peru

San Borja
- District
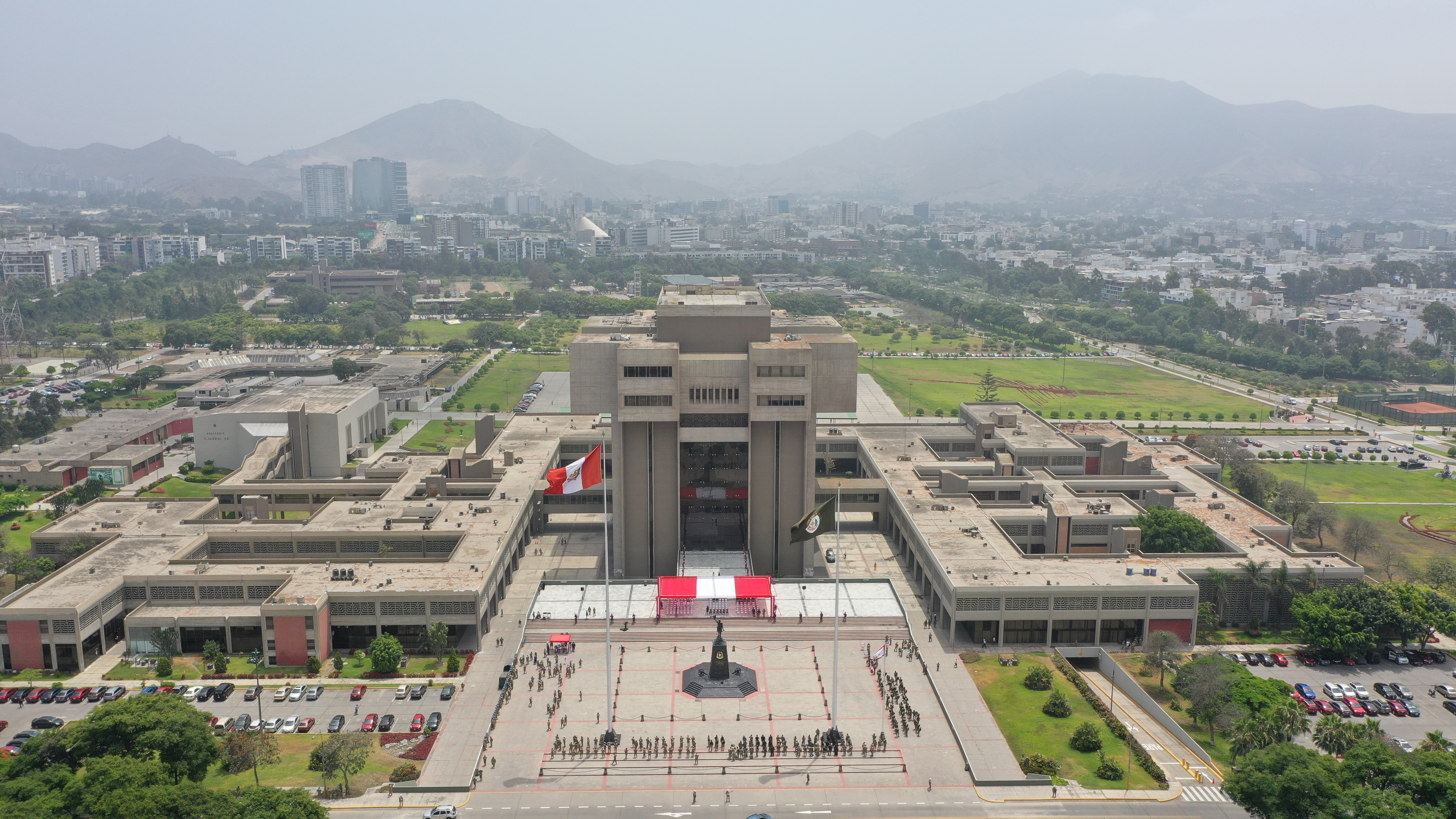
- Headquarters of the Peruvian Army

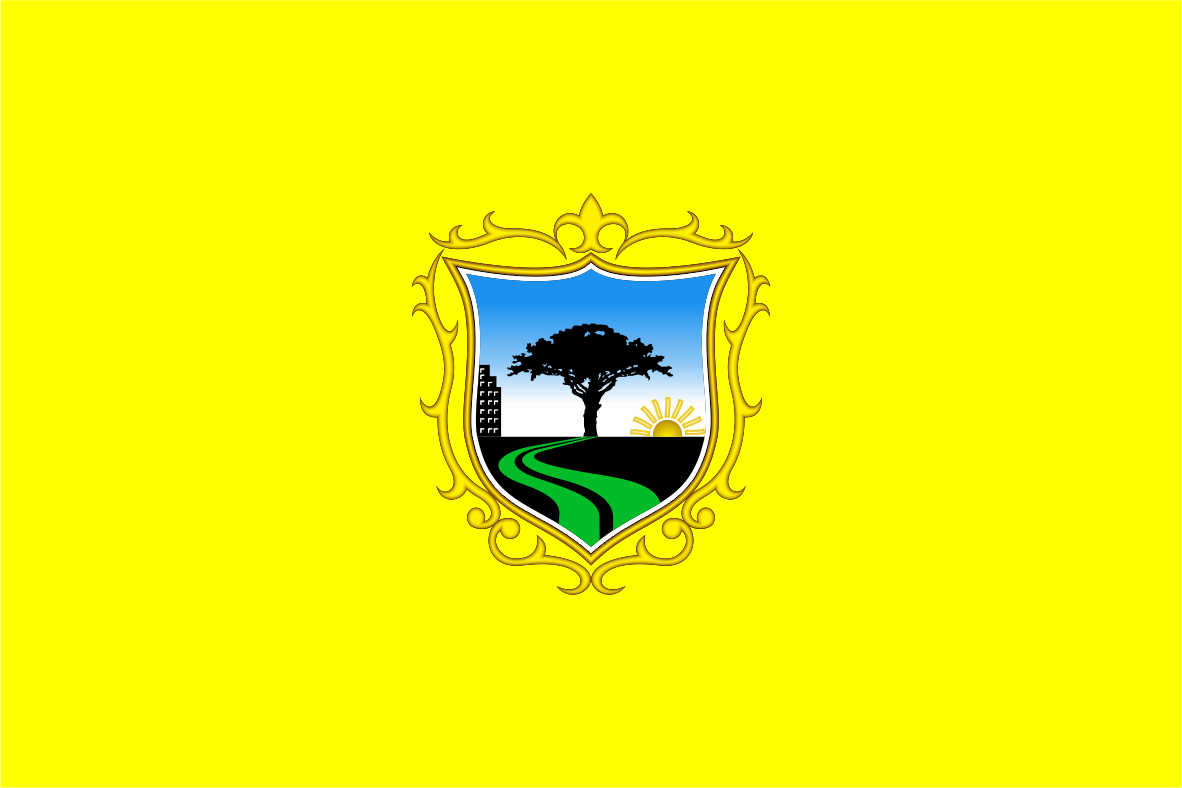
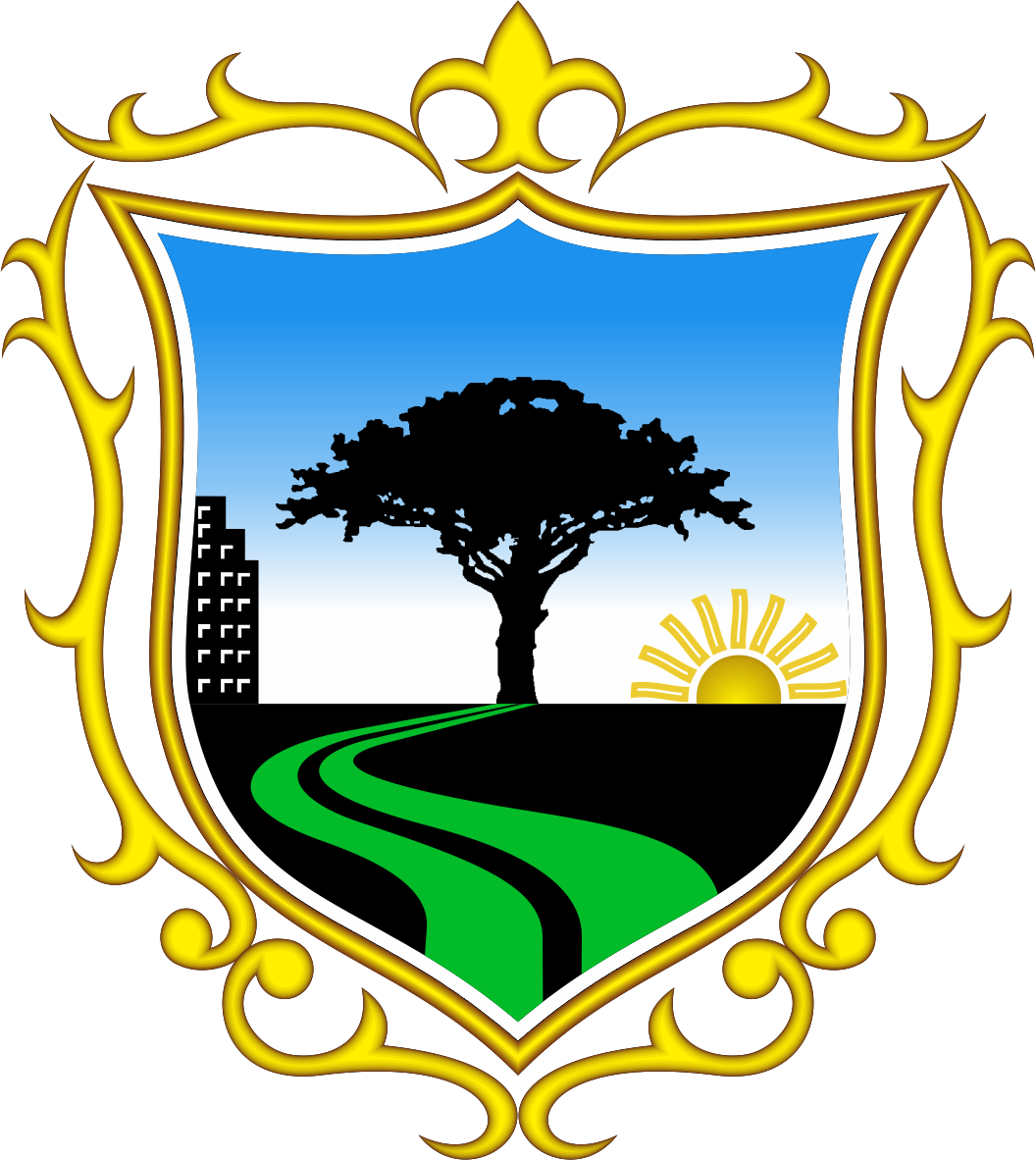
- Flag Coat of arms

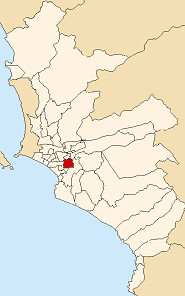
- Location of San Borja in Peru
- Coordinates: 12°06′S 77°01′W
- Country: Peru
- Department: Lima
- Province: Lima
- Founded: June 1, 1983
- Subdivisions: 1 populated centre

Government
  - Mayor: Marco Álvarez

Area
  - Total: 9.96 km^{2} (3.85 sq mi)
- Elevation: 170 m (560 ft)

Population (2023)
  - Total: 133,328
  - Density: 13,400/km^{2} (34,700/sq mi)
- Time zone: UTC-5 (PET)
- 150130: UBIGEO
- Website: munisanborja.gob.pe

San Borja (Spanish: [san ˈboɾ.xa]; lit. 'Saint Borgia') is a district of Lima, Peru. Created in 1983, it is a residential and upper-middle and upper-class district, known for its large number of green spaces, its government institutions, and its close association with the Ministry of Culture, which operates the National Cultural Centre, a major cultural and performing arts hub located in the northwestern part of the district.

== Etymology ==
The district takes its name from San Francisco de Borja, an agricultural estate dating back to the Spanish period operated by the Jesuit novitiate of Saint Anthony the Abbot. The estate was itself named after Francis Borgia, a Catholic saint.

== History ==
The district was originally a rural area owned by the Brescia family. In 1962, the terrain—then part of Surquillo—was sold by the children of businessman Fortunato Brescia Tassano and María Catalina Cafferata for the construction of a parish and a school. The first neighbourhood (urbanización) to be built was that of Primavera de Monterrico, built in 1966 by the same company that would later construct Monterrico Norte, another neighbourhood near the Headquarters of the Peruvian Army. In the 1970s, the neighbourhoods of Córpac (located between Gálvez Barrenechea and Mercator streets), San Borja Norte and San Borja Sur (located between Javier Prado and San Borja Sur avenues), Las Magnolias (located south of San Borja Sur) and Juan XXIII were developed. In the 1980s, housing projects such as the Torres de San Borja and the Torres de Limatambo were also built. In January 1983, student journalists and neighbours of what was then Surquillo's San Borja neighbourhood created the Prensa Chica de San Borja, a local newspaper, through which they promoted the creation of a new district, separate from Surquillo.

The district was officially established on June 1, 1983, through Law No. 23604, incorporating areas originally belonging to Surquillo, Santiago de Surco and San Luis. It limits were set by a number of streets: to the north by Canada Avenue, to the east by the Southern Pan-American Highway, to the south by Primavera Avenue and to the west by Guardia Civil and José Gálvez Barrenechea avenues.

In the aftermath of the establishment of the Revolutionary Government of the Armed Forces, a number of members of the Peruvian Armed Forces and supporters of Juan Velasco Alvarado established their residences in the area of Chacarilla del Estanque, which led to its nickname of "Cachaquería del Estanque" by detractors of the regime.

The district hosted the 2014 United Nations Climate Change Conference.

== Politics ==
San Borja is under the jurisdiction of its own district municipality, as well as that of the Metropolitan Municipality of Lima.

=== List of mayors ===
Since 2023, the incumbent mayor is Marco Álvarez Vargas.

№	Mayor	Party	Term	
№	Mayor	Party	Begin	End
1	Hugo Sánchez Solari	Partido Popular Cristiano	1984	1989
1	Hugo Sánchez Solari	Frente Democrático	1990	1992
2	Luisa María Cuculiza Torre	Frente Renovador Independiente	1993	1998
2	Luisa María Cuculiza Torre	Somos Perú	1999	1999
3	Jorge Lermo Rengifo	Somos Perú	1999	2002
4	Carlos Alberto Tejada Noriega	Democracia con Valores	2003	2006
4	Carlos Alberto Tejada Noriega	Democracia con Valores	2007	2010
5	Marco Antonio Álvarez Vargas	Partido Popular Cristiano	2011	2014
5	Marco Antonio Álvarez Vargas	Partido Popular Cristiano	2015	2018
6	Alberto Tejada Noriega	Acción Popular	2019	2022
7	Marco Antonio Álvarez Vargas	Renovación Popular	2023	Incumbent

=== Subdivisions ===
San Borja is divided into twelve sectors, as well as several neighbourhoods. It is also the site of a lone populated centre that is coterminous with the district:

Code	Name	Region Type	Altitude (MSL)	Population (total)	Housing (total)
0001	San Francisco de Borja	Chala	170	113,247 (2017)	40,121 (2017)

=== Twin cities ===
San Borja District is twinned with:

- Bethlehem, Palestine
- Jericho, Palestine
- Machu Picchu, Peru
- Miraflores, Peru
- Ollantaytambo, Peru
- Orion, United States
- Ramat Gan, Israel
- Veintiséis de Octubre, Peru

== Geography ==
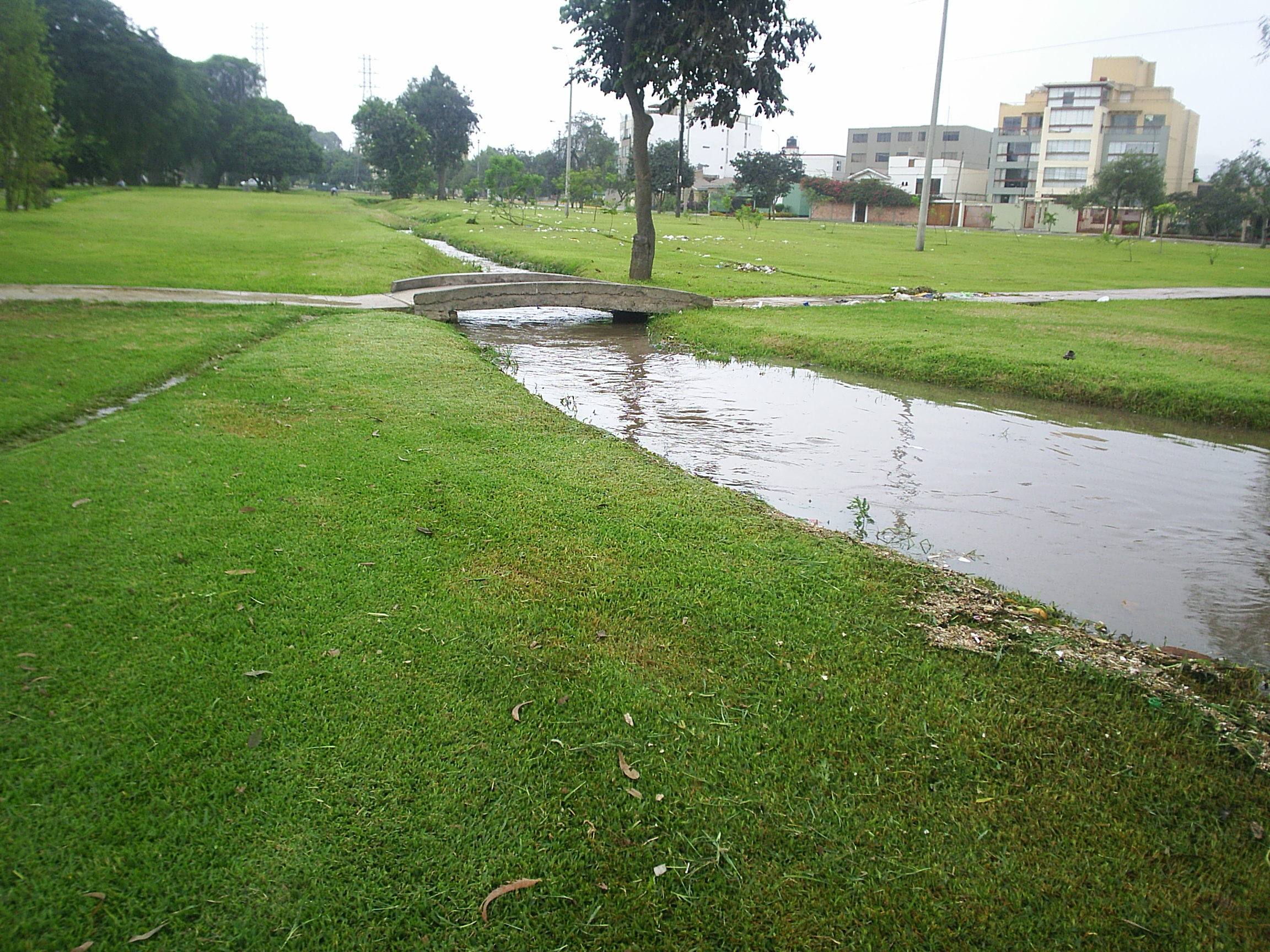
The Surco River in San Borja.

San Borja is approximately 150 metres (492 feet) above sea level. Its terrain is mostly flat, with a gentle downward east–west slope. The Surco River traverses the district in a north–south direction. This is not an actual river, it is a canal fed from the Rímac River and used to irrigate public parks.

=== Boundaries ===
San Borja is bordered to the north by San Luis and La Victoria, to the east and south by Santiago de Surco, to the southwest by Surquillo and to the west by San Isidro. All of the aformentioned districts are part of the Cono Centro, an unofficial subdivision of the city.

=== Climate ===
San Borja has a climate typical of the Peruvian coastal area. The weather is mild, with warm summers and cool winters, and humid all year round. It never rains but during the months from June to October its streets dampen due to a fine drizzle, called "garúa" in Spanish. During this period, the sky is constantly overcast. Average temperatures in San Borja range between 18 and 22 °C (64 and 72 °F). The summer season lasts from December to April. During this time temperatures can reach highs of 28 to 30 °C (82 to 86 °F). Winter lasts from May to November with temperatures as low as 12 to 15 °C (54 to 59 °F).

Climate data for Lima
Month	Jan	Feb	Mar	Apr	May	Jun	Jul	Aug	Sep	Oct	Nov	Dec	Year
Record high °F	79	79	79	75	72	68	66	64	66	68	72	75	72
Record high °C	26	26	26	24	22	20	19	18	19	20	22	24	22
Average precipitation days	1	1	0	0	1	2	3	3	3	2	2	0	16
Average rainy days	4	2	3	2	5	11	12	15	13	7	5	3	82
Average relative humidity (%)	85	80	80	85	85	85	85	85	85	85	85	85	84.2
Mean monthly sunshine hours	179.1	169	139.2	184	116.4	50.6	28.6	32.3	37.3	65.3	89	139.2	1,284
Source: Weatherbase (Temperature, precipitation and humidity). and Universidad Complutense de Madrid (Sunlight)

=== Geology ===
San Borja, as most of the rest of Metropolitan Lima, is built on the alluvial fan formed by the Rimac river during the Quaternary Period. The river deposited up to 300 metres of rounded pebbles, coarse sand and small amounts of fine sand and silt in the valley. Geologists call this type of soil conglomerate. The probable earthquake intensity in the San Borja area is Grade VII in the Modified Mercalli scale. This compares favourably with Grade IX in some areas of La Molina, Callao and Chorrillos.

== Ecology ==
The district is known for its large number of green spaces. One such park, known as the Parque de la Felicidad, features a water treatment plant designed by former Housing Minister Luis Felipe Bedoya Vélez. In 2019, 550 trees were planted at a 3-hectare (7.4-acre) site within the boundaries of the Headquarters of the Peruvian Army. They included Tipuana trees, Brazilian pepper trees, and papelillo trees, among others.

The Monarch butterfly, a vulnerable migratory species, may be found in the district due to the presence of milkweeds. The Peregrine falcon, known for its speed, may also be seen.

== Demographics ==
According to the Instituto Nacional de Estadística e Informática, the age distribution of the population of San Borja is as follows:

Age Group	Population
0-10	23,227
11-14	26,163
15-29	26,964
30-59	46,720
60+	10,412
Total	133,486

As of 2017, the district's total population was numbered at 113,247 people, and the housing was numbered at 40,121 houses.

=== Crime ===
In 2024, the district was considered the third safest in the city, behind Magdalena del Mar and San Isidro. It was made a member of the World Health Organization's International Safe Community programme in 2008 and declared a Low-Carbon Model Town by the Asia-Pacific Economic Cooperation in 2013.

=== Education ===
The district is part of Local Educational Management Unit 07 (UGEL 07).

=== Notable people ===
- Luisa María Cuculiza, politician and former member of Congress
- Keiko Fujimori, politician and president-elect of Peru
- Abimael Guzmán, convicted terrorist and leader of the Shining Path
- Roberto Sánchez, psychologist and politician

== Culture ==
San Borja is considered a cultural district, serving as the seat of the National Cultural Centre (Spanish: Centro Cultural de la Nación; CCN), a government complex located at the district's northwestern sector, which hosts a number of buildings administered by the Ministry of Culture, including its headquarters.

Since 2003, the district's municipal government lights up a 200-metre (660 ft) Christmas tree at the district's Family Park (Parque de la Familia), where decorations and temporary structures are also constructed as part of the Christmas season. As of 2008, it was the largest in the city.

=== Landmarks ===
San Borja is a residential district that hosts a number of landmarks, including several government institutions.

Landmarks of San Borja
Name	Location	Notes	Photo
Banco de la Nación	Javier Prado Este 2499	The building serves as the headquarters of the bank of the same name. It is the tallest building in the country.	
Coliseo Eduardo Dibós	Avenida Angamos Este 2681	The building has a capacity for 4,600 people and functions as a multi-purpose indoor arena.	
Grand National Theatre	Javier Prado Este 2225	Located at the CCN, the building functions as a multi-purpose theatre and concert hall. It was inaugurated in 2011.	
Headquarters of the Peruvian Army	Paseo del Bosque 740	Often referred to as the "Little Pentagon" (Pentagonito), it is located in the southeastern part of the district. Its architecture is typical of that of the military government of the 1970s. The outer perimeter of 4.5 km is a very popular circuit for joggers and runners, and during weekends its adjacent streets are closed for jogging and other sports events.	
Huaca San Borja	Avenida de la Arqueología	The Pre-Columbian complex dates back to the Ichma period, which predated that of the Inca Empire.	
Lima Convention Center	Avenida de la Arqueología 160	Located at the CCN, the building functions as a convention centre, hosting high-profile summits hosted in the district.	
Ministry of Culture	Javier Prado Este 2465	Located at the CCN, it was designed as the headquarters of a now defunct ministry, after which it functioned as the Bank of the Nation's headquarters, and later as the country's largest museum from 1980 to 2014. Its brutalist architecture is typical of the military government at the time. Following the museum's closure, it was repurposed as the headquarters of the Ministry of Culture.	
Ministry of Education	Calle del Comercio 193	Since 2011, the building serves as the ministry's headquarters. Its design is that of a column made of books stacked on top of each other.	
Ministry of Energy and Mines	Avenida de las Artes Sur 260	The building hosts the ministry of the same name, a government entity responsible for managing the country's energy and mining sectors. Additionally, it is charged with overseeing the equal distribution of energy nationwide.	
National Institute of Child Health	Javier Prado Este 3101	Inaugurated in 2013, the building functions as one of two branches of the pediatric institute. It functions as the country's most important pediatric centre, serving as the destination for patients transported from elsewhere in the country.	
National Library of Peru	Avenida De La Poesía 160	Located at the CCN, the building was completed in 2006. It serves as one of two buildings used by the institution in the city. It hosts a theatre, an ampitheatre, a cafeteria, exhibition halls, 12 reading rooms with internet access, a print archive (hemeroteca) storage areas and administrative offices. Security is provided by a CCTV network and a modern fire control system.	
Peruvian Institute of Nuclear Energy	Avenida Canadá 1480	Created in 1975, the institute's main goal is to promote and supervise the applications of nuclear energy in the country.	
Torres de Limatambo	Aviación & Angamos	Housing project promoted by architect Fernando Belaúnde during his second presidency, located south of the city's former airport. Its facilities include a parish, public squares, businesses, sports facilities and the Huaca Limatambo.	

== Transport ==
The district is serviced by the Lima and Callao Metro's Line 1. Three stations (Angamos, San Borja Sur and La Cultura) are located alongside the path of Avenida Aviación.

Residents of the district also have access to public bicycles through San Borja En Bici, a sports programme established in 2012. An "ecological bike path," a route featuring natural grass only, was inaugurated in 2013. The start of the COVID-19 pandemic in Peru saw the establishment of a network of cycle paths in the district, and, following a three-year pause, it resumed operations in February 2023.

== See also ==
- Administrative divisions of Peru
- Chacarilla del Estanque
