= Gran Teatro Nacional del Perú =

Coordinates: 12.0864°S 77.0033°W

Gran Teatro Nacional
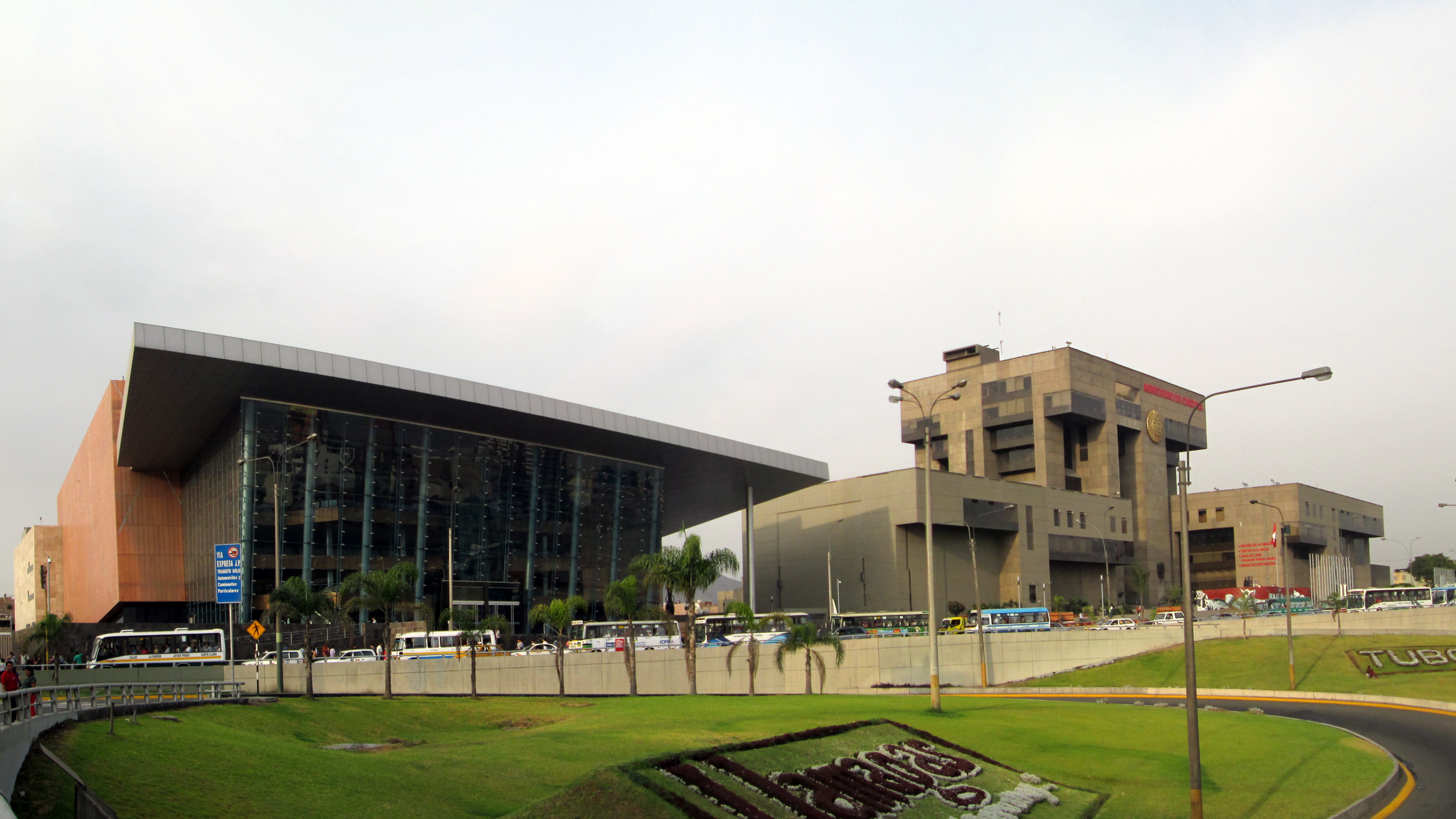

General information
- Type: Multi-purpose theatre
- Architectural style: Postmodernism
- Location: Lima, Peru
- Completed: 2011
- Opened: 23 July 2011

The Gran Teatro Nacional del Perú (Grand National Theater of Peru) is a multi-purpose theatre and concert hall in Lima, Peru. It is part of the Cultural Tridium, and is flanked by the National Library of Peru and the Museo de la Nación.

The theatre was inaugurated on 23 July 2011. The theatre has a capacity of up to 1500 people, and uses the latest technology in acoustics and sound engineering to support performance genres ranging from opera, philharmonic orchestras, pop stars, Broadway shows and more. The building includes rehearsal rooms, dressing rooms, restaurants, cafeteria, library and rooms for various types of events.

In July 2012 it hosted a performance of the opera-ballet Akas Kas by Peruvian composer Nilo Valerde.

The state funeral of former president Alberto Fujimori was held in the building on 14 September 2024.

== History ==
=== Patronage ===
In 2007, the Peruvian government invited businessman Fernando Belmont and the companies Telefónica and Backus & Johnston to establish the Patronage of the Gran Teatro Nacional (National Grand Theater). They were later joined by Interbank, Repsol, América Móvil, LAN, the Gildemeister Group, Graña y Montero, Xtrata Copper, builder Ricardo Mont, Volcan Compañía Minera, Southern Peru, Cementos Lima, Hunt Oil, Andina de Radiodifusión, Antamina, Buenaventura, Luz del Sur, Ferreyros, Banco Interamericano de Finanzas, Paraíso, Cesel Ingenieros, Frecuencia Latina, as well as the national institutions Banco de la Nación, Corporación Financiera de Desarrollo, and Mivivienda.

=== Construction ===
The Patronage held a competition among architectural firms, and the winner was the firm of architect Alfonso de la Piedra, who was responsible for overseeing the overall structural design. Meanwhile, architect José Nepomuceno was responsible for the acoustic structure and theatrical mechanics.

Construction was carried out by Graña y Montero. The theater was built on the site where the Vértice de la Cultura had stood, a property belonging to the Museo de la Nación (National Museum). The site had previously been used as a venue for major shows and concerts, and sometimes as a theater housed inside a giant tent.

=== Inauguration ===
The theater was inaugurated on July 23, 2011, in the presence of President Alan García Pérez, Minister of Foreign Affairs José Antonio García Belaúnde, and Minister of Culture Juan Ossio Acuña, as well as the foreign ministers of Chile, Alfredo Moreno Charme, and Colombia, María Ángela Holguín.

The ceremony featured the National Symphony Orchestra of Peru, Canadian soprano Erin Wall, and Italian bass-baritone Ruggero Raimondi.

=== COVID-19 pandemic ===
In March 2020, in response to the global health emergency and mandatory social restrictions, and in order to maintain contact with its audience, the digital platform GTN en Vivo was created. It provided an alternative way for people to continue enjoying the performing arts from home.

During 2022, 215 in-person artistic activities were held at the venue, with a total attendance of 128,000 people.

== Directors ==
- Juan Carlos Adrianzén (May 2012–December 2016)
- Mauricio Salas Torreblanca (January 11, 2017–September 30, 2021)
- Miguel Tomas Díaz (October 3, 2021–December 10, 2021)
- Miguel Chivilchez Talledo (January 11, 2022–March 31, 2023)
- Paul Chata Béjar (April 3, 2023–January 31, 2024)
- José Vadillo Vila (February 5, 2024–October 31, 2024)
- Rocío Urbina Linares (November 2024–October 21, 2025)
- Miguel Chivilchez Talledo (October 23, 2025–Julio 30, 2026)
