= Chacarilla del Estanque =

Neighbourhood of Lima, Peru

- Neighbourhood
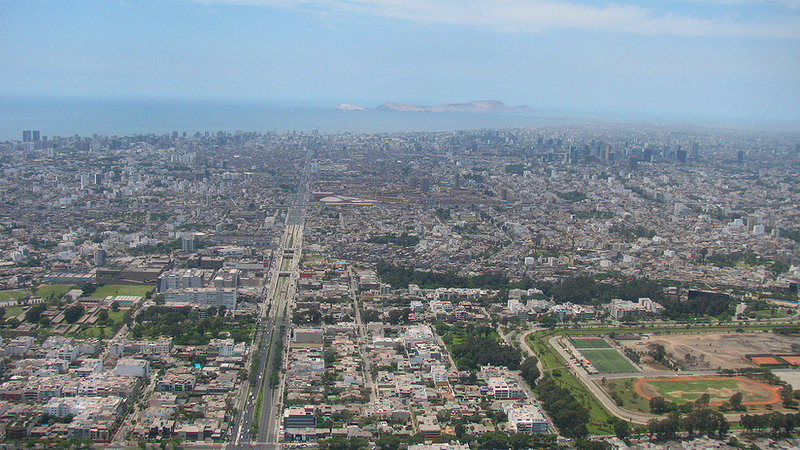
- Aerial view of Lima, with Chacarilla (centre left) and the Pentagonito (right) in the foreground
- Interactive map of Chacarilla del Estanque
- Country: Peru
- Department: Lima
- Province: Lima
- District: San Borja & Santiago de Surco
- Established: 20th century

Population (1994)
  - Total: 5,362
- Time zone: UTC-5 (PET)

Chacarilla del Estanque (pronounced [t͡ʃakaˈɾiʝa ðel esˈtaŋke]), also known simply as Chacarilla (pronounced [t͡ʃakaˈɾiʝa]), is a neighbourhood located in the districts of San Borja and Santiago de Surco, in Lima, Peru. An upper class area of both districts, it is located south of the Headquarters of the Peruvian Army and known for its commercial sector, most notably its shopping centre.

== History ==
During the Spanish period, the area was an estate where a reservoir was built to water the area, as well as the neighbouring haciendas, known as San Juan and Villa. The water was sourced from the Surco and Ate rivers, and its distribution, through which the estate's owners made a profit, gradually led to its current name. During the 17th century and until their expulsion in 1757, the estate was the property of the Jesuits, already known as Chacarilla del Estanque. Under this order, it became an agricultural complex with fruit and olive trees. By the late 19th century, the property was owned by Vicenzo "Vicente" Risso, an Italian Peruvian who valued it at S/. 21,000.

=== 19th century ===
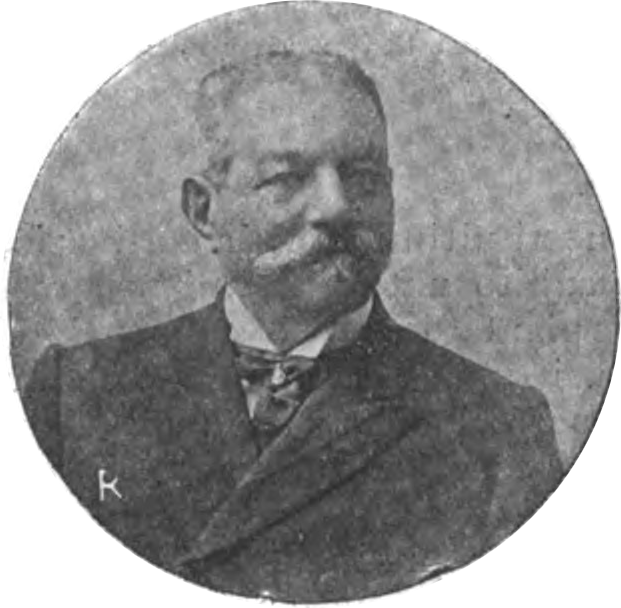
Giacomo Orezzoli, who rented the property from 1880 to 1895.

Italian–Peruvian businessman Giacomo Orezzoli rented the hacienda from 1880 to 1895, when he purchased it with his brother Nicola. On the same year, it was invaded and damaged by the troops under the command of Pedro P. Collazos on February 1, during the civil war between Andrés Avelino Cáceres and Nicolás de Piérola that concluded a month later. Rapallo-born Santiago Orezzoli was later compensated with a single payment of S/. 660.

=== 20th century ===
The 3,030,000 m^{2} terrain was urbanised and sold by the Izaga family in the 1970s, who opened a shopping centre named after the adjacent Caminos del Inca Avenue in 1988 (originally known as the Fashion Mall Caminos del Inca). The new establishment replaced a convent originally destined to become a hospital, and was expanded in 2001. In the aftermath of the establishment of the Revolutionary Government of the Armed Forces, a number of members of the Peruvian Armed Forces and supporters of Juan Velasco Alvarado established their residences in the area during the same period, which led to its nickname of "Cachaquería del Estanque" by detractors of the regime.

Around the same period, a supermarket chain known as Gálax was established to develop the area, then owned by the Castañeda family. The store's success led to its expansion in 1976, and the building was ultimately purchased by the Grupo Wong in the 1990s to house its supermarket.

The neighbourhood's largest educational centre is Santa María Marianistas, a private Catholic school. Originally located at the third block of Arequipa Avenue, it moved to María Reina, a church in San Isidro, in 1944, moving again to its current location in 1959. A number of schools also operate in the area, including the Santísimo Nombre de Jesús, a private Catholic school, and the San Gabriel Arcángel Institute, a special education school established in 1958.

During the Peruvian conflict, the leader of the Shining Path, Abimael Guzmán, lived hidden in house number 265 of the neighbourhood's Buena Vista Avenue. The house was one of several raided by the Special Intelligence Group on January 31, 1991, where materials related to the group were found, including a videotape of its most important members—including Guzmán—dancing to Zorba's Dance, a Greek instrumental song.

The neighbourhood saw the opening of the country's second McDonald's restaurant soon after the first one's inauguration in October 1996.

=== 21st century ===
An office complex in Caminos del Inca Avenue that forms part of the neighbourhood's commercial sector houses the Southern Copper Corporation since its 2005 merger with the Southern Peru Copper Corporation.

On March 26, 2026, a crane collapsed at a construction site at the corner of Del Pinar and Primavera avenues, a high-transit zone. The collapse took place at 12:39 pm PET and caused material damage to its immediate surroundings, destroying two cars and a motorcycle, while the crane's conductor suffered minor injuries when jumping off the machine. Montacargas y Transportes Edgar EIRL, the company responsible for the crane, was fined S/. 20,000, and the construction works, which had a permit to operate, were temporarily suspended.

El Hornero, a Peruvian steakhouse chain, opened its seventh location at the intersection of Alejandro Velasco Astete and Primavera avenues in late 2026. A terrain was originally the property of Supermercados Peruanos S.A., who attempted to build a Vivanda supermarket which was ultimately rejected by neighbours at the time. The company later considered attempting this project a second time. In 2024, an express supermarket, Holi, opened across the street from the terrain.

== Notable people ==
- Alan García, former president of Peru
- Abimael Guzmán, convicted terrorist and leader of the Shining Path
- Armando Villanueva, APRA politician

== See also ==
- San Borja District
- Santiago de Surco
