= Alberto Tejada =

Peruvian politician (born 1956)

Mayor of San Borja
- In office 1 January 2019 – 31 December 2022
- Preceded by: Marco Álvarez Vargas
- Succeeded by: Marco Álvarez Vargas
- In office 1 January 2003 – 31 December 2010
- Preceded by: Jorge Lermo Rengifo
- Succeeded by: Marco Álvarez Vargas

Minister of Health
- In office 28 July 2011 – 23 July 2012
- President: Ollanta Humala
- Prime Minister: Salomon Lerner; Óscar Valdés
- Preceded by: Óscar Ugarte
- Succeeded by: Midori de Habich Rospigliosi

Personal details
- Born: 11 November 1956 (age 70) Lima, Peru

Carlos Alberto Tejada Noriega (born 11 November 1956 in Lima, Peru) is a former Peruvian Minister of Health between 2011 and 2012. He was also a urologist and later a football referee.

== Football career ==
He refereed three matches in the FIFA World Cup, two in 1994 and one in 1998.

In 2010, he ran against Manuel Burga to head the Peruvian Football Federation.

== Political career ==
He was the mayor of San Borja District (2003–2006 and 2007-2010). He was the Peruvian Minister of Health during the presidency of Ollanta Humala, between July 28, 2011 and July 23, 2012. He was elected mayor of San Borja for a their term (2019-2022) with Popular Action (Peru)
