= Luisa María Cuculiza =

Peruvian politician

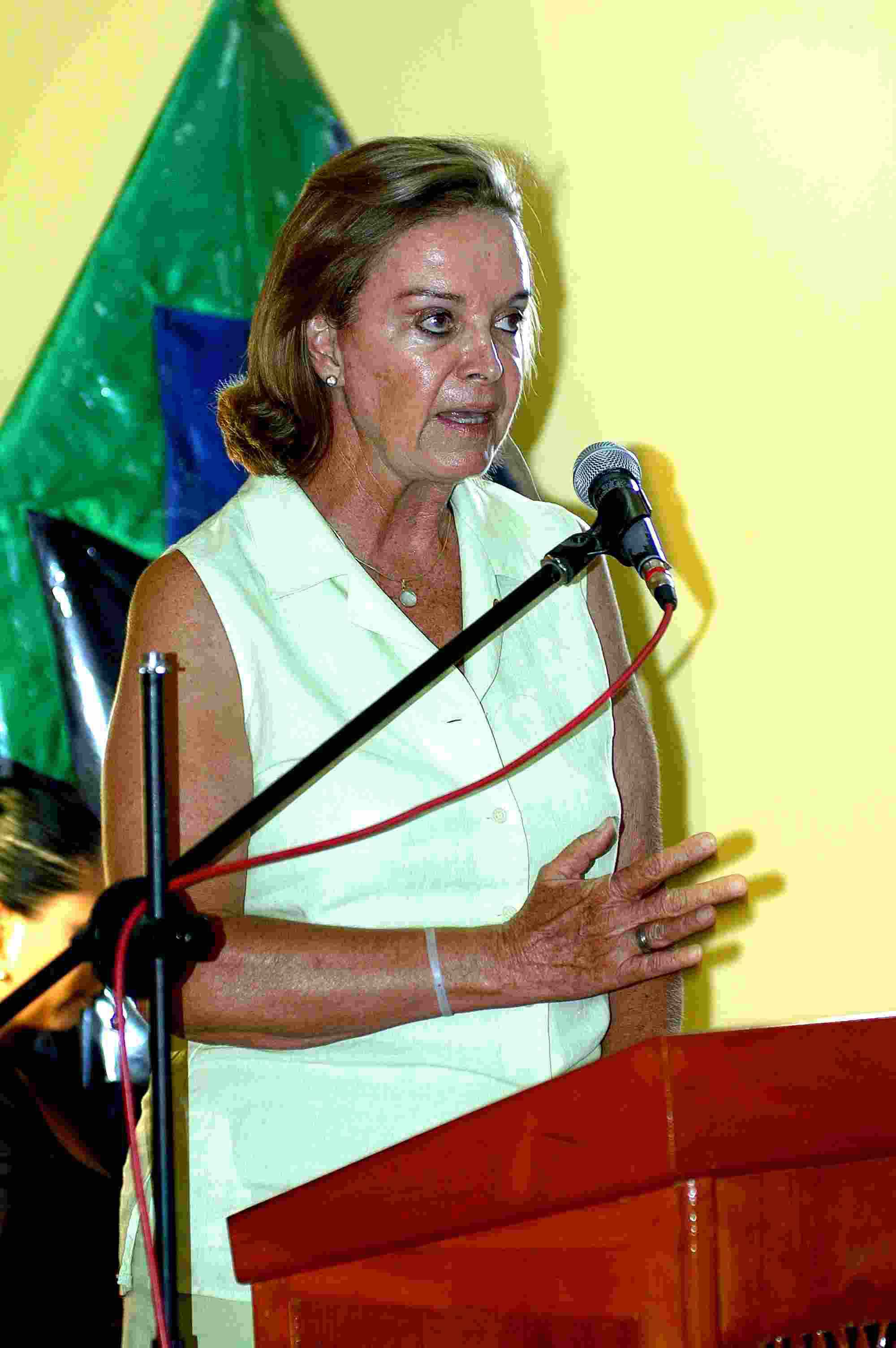

Member of Congress
- In office 26 July 2006 – 26 July 2016
- Constituency: Lima

Personal details
- Born: Luisa María Cuculiza Torre; 9 March 1942 (age 84) Ambo, Peru
- Party: Popular Force (since 2010); Sí Cumple (1999-2010); We Are Peru (until 1999)
- Other political affiliations: Alliance for the Future (2006-2010)

Luisa María Cuculiza Torre (born 9 March 1942) is a Peruvian Fujimorist politician and a Congresswoman representing Lima for two terms between 2006 and 2016.

== Political career ==
From 1993 to 1999, she was mayor (alcalde) of Lima's San Borja District. She was the Minister of Women's Promotion and Social Development from 1999 to 2000, under President Alberto Fujimori. From 2004 to 2010, she was the secretary of the Sí Cumple party, coordinating the party's local and regional governments, and was the candidate for First Vice President on the Fujimori-led Sí Cumple ticket in the 2006 election, which was rejected due to a ban on the former president. Nevertheless, she was elected to Congress in the constituency of Lima on the Alliance for the Future list.

In the 2011 elections, she was re-elected for another five-year term, this time on the Fuerza 2011 party.

Cuculiza remained loyal to former President Fujimori, telling Reuters in 2017 when he was pardoned by President Pedro Pablo Kuczynski that Fujimori was "the best president Peru ever had".
