= Patricia Balbuena =

Peruvian lawyer and public servant

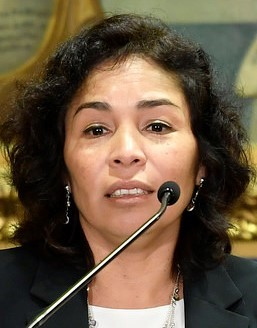

8th Minister of Culture
- In office 2 April 2018 – 30 November 2018
- President: Martín Vizcarra
- Prime Minister: César Villanueva
- Preceded by: Alejandro Neyra
- Succeeded by: Rogers Valencia

Personal details
- Born: Patricia Jacquelyn Balbuena Palacios La Esperanza District, Peru
- Education: National University of San Marcos
- Occupation: Lawyer, professor, public servant

Patricia Jacquelyn Balbuena Palacios is a Peruvian lawyer and public servant. She was the Minister of Culture of Peru from April to November 2018 during the first eight months of Martín Vizcarra's government.

== Biography ==
Patricia Balbuena was born in La Esperanza District, Trujillo.

She entered the Pontifical Catholic University of Peru, where she studied law. She has a master's degree in social policies with a mention in gender, population, and development, and has done doctoral studies in social sciences, with a specialty in anthropology at the National University of San Marcos.

She served as Vice Minister of Intercultural Affairs from November 2013 to August 2016, and was executive director of the Cuna Más program.

Balbuena was the Executive Director of Intercultural Affairs at the Ministry of Culture. She has also been an advisor to the United States Agency for International Development and the World Bank. She worked as a researcher for the Truth and Reconciliation Commission. She is a professor at the Pontifical Catholic University's School of Government and the National University of San Marcos.

On 2 April 2018, she was sworn in as the fourth Minister of Culture of Peru, in the cabinet of President Martín Vizcarra. She remained in office until 30 November 2018 when she resigned.
