= Avenida Javier Prado =

Street in Lima, Peru

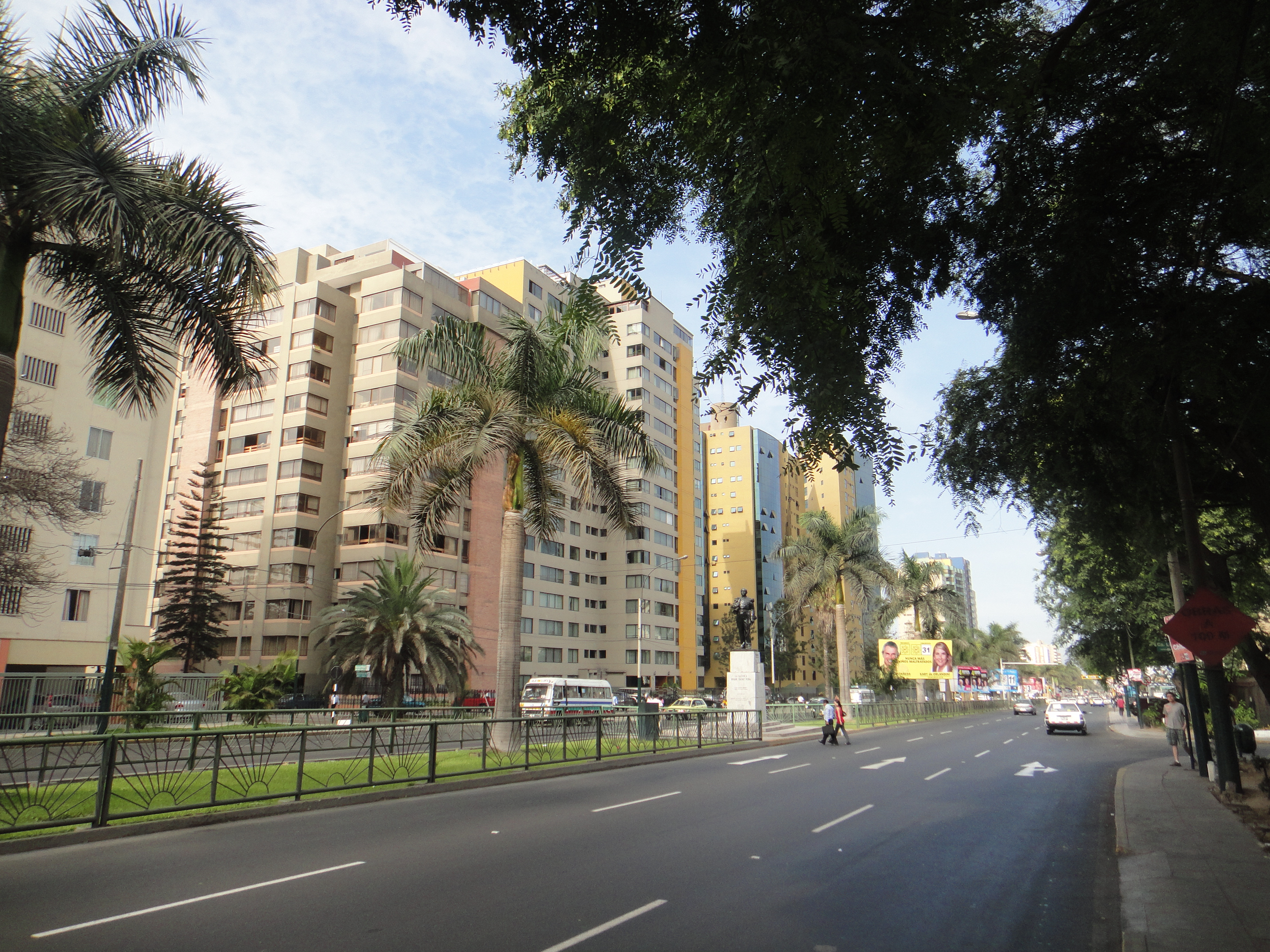
- The avenue in the San Isidro district.
- Interactive map of Avenida Javier Prado
- Location: Lima
- West end: Avenida Brasil (Oeste); Avenida Arequipa (Este)
- Major junctions: Javier Prado Oeste: Avenida Parque Gonzáles Prada; Avenida Juan de Aliaga; Avenida Salaverry; Avenida Sánchez Carrión; Avenida Arenales; Avenida Jorge Basadre; Javier Prado Este: Avenida Petit Thouars; Avenida Paseo Parodi; Avenida Rivera Navarrete; Paseo de la República; Avenida Nicolás Arriola; Avenida José Gálvez; Avenida Luis Aldana; Avenida del Aire; Avenida Guardia Civil; Avenida Aviación; Avenida San Luis; Avenida Agustín de la Rosa Toro; Carretera Panamericana Sur; Avenida Manuel Olguín, Avenida Las Palmeras / Club Golf Los Incas; Avenida Circunvalación del Golf Los Incas; Avenida Los Frutales; Avenida La Molina; Avenida Los Ingenieros; Avenida Flora Tristán; Avenida Huarochirí / Melgarejo; Avenida Vista Alegre; Carretera Central; Avenida Metropolitana
- East end: Avenida Arequipa (Oeste); Avenida María Morelos (Este)

Other
- Known for: • Interbank Tower; • National Library of Peru; • La Rambla San Borja; • Ministry of Culture; • Jockey Plaza; • University of Lima; • Estadio Monumental; • Puruchuco

Javier Prado Avenue (Spanish: Avenida Javier Prado) is one of the main avenues of Lima, capital of Peru. It is the second longest avenue of the city, after the Avenida Universitaria. It goes from west to east, passing through the districts of Magdalena del Mar, San Isidro, Lince, La Victoria, San Borja, Santiago de Surco, Ate and La Molina along 135 blocks.

It is divided into two segments: East Javier Prado (Spanish: Avenida Javier Prado Este) from Arequipa Avenue until its end in the Ate District with a total of 101 blocks, and West Javier Prado (Spanish: Avenida Javier Prado Oeste) from the Arequipa Avenue until its beginning in the Brasil Avenue in the Magdalena del Mar district, with a total of 34 blocks. The Arequipa Avenue is used as a point of separation of both segments.

== Name ==
The avenue is named after Javier Prado y Ugarteche, son of President Mariano Ignacio Prado, who governed Peru during the War of the Pacific. Prado worked as a historian, philosopher and lawyer, serving as rector of the National University of San Marcos from 1915 to 1921. It is divided into two sections by Arequipa Avenue: West Javier Prado (Spanish: Avenida Javier Prado Oeste) and East Javier Prado (Spanish: Avenida Javier Prado Este). The latter is continued into Ate District under the name Prolongación Javier Prado.

== History ==
The construction of an expressway to solve the avenue's traffic issues was discussed in 2001 by Alberto Andrade.

== Route ==
The avenue travels through east to west, passing through the districts of Magdalena del Mar, San Isidro, Lince, La Victoria, San Borja, Santiago de Surco, Ate and La Molina.

== Transport ==
The avenue is the fourth most congested street in Lima, and has 29 public transport routes using it.

== See also ==
- Paseo de la República Avenue
