= Headquarters of the Peruvian Army =

Military complex in Lima, Peru

- Cuartel General del Ejército
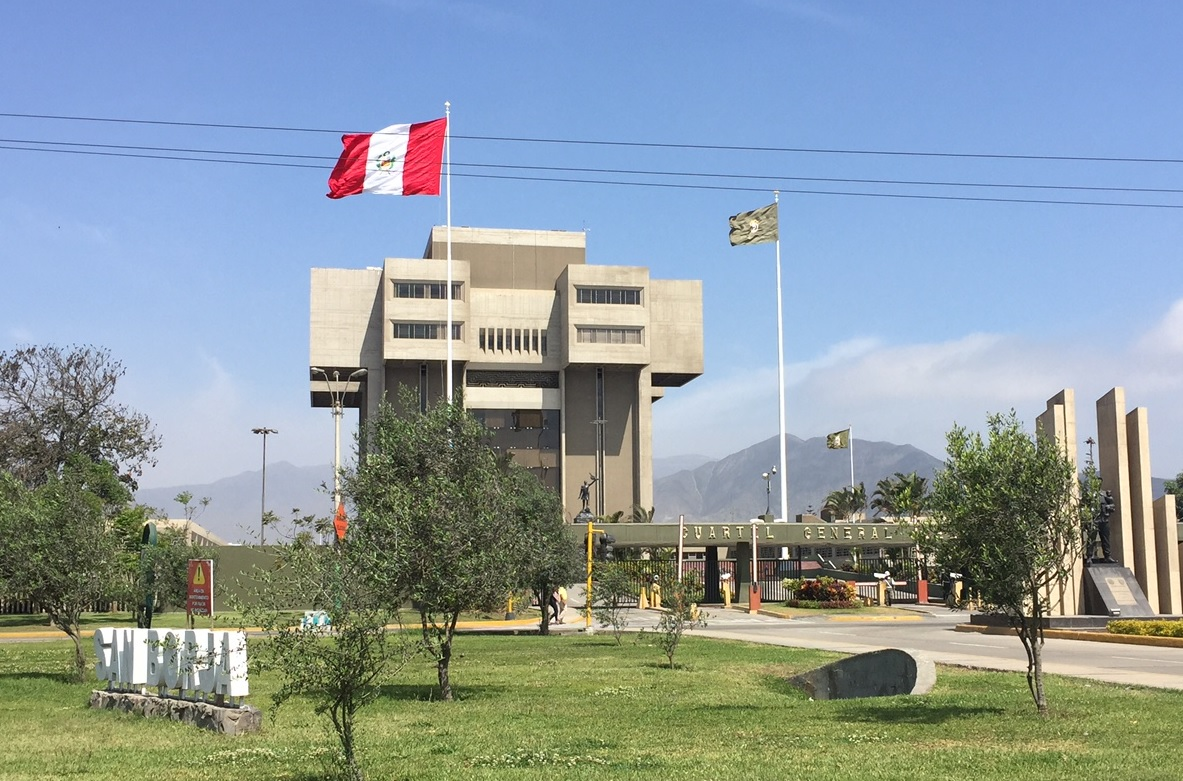
- Interactive map of the Headquarters of the Peruvian Army area
- Alternative names: Pentagonito

General information
- Architectural style: Brutalism
- Location: Paseo del Bosque 740, San Borja, Lima, Peru
- Coordinates: 12°06′03″S 76°59′13″W
- Year built: 1973–1975
- Inaugurated: January 22, 1975
- Owner: Peruvian Army

Design and construction
- Architect: Juan Günther Doering

The Headquarters of the Peruvian Army (Spanish: Cuartel General del Ejército), also known as the Pentagonito (lit. 'Little Pentagon'), is a military complex operated by the Peruvian Army in San Borja, a district of Lima, Peru. Built in the brutalist style, it functions as the district's de facto main square. Its common name references the military complex in Virginia; the complex, however, is not shaped like a pentagon.

== History ==
=== Background ===
In January 1971, the then Commander General of the Army and Minister of War, Major General Ernesto Montagne Sánchez, made the decision that the new premises for the Army Headquarters should respond to functional and security conditions in a wide area which would allow it to centralize all the organizations of the War Sector, the High Command of the Army and its Support, Advisory and Service Bodies, which, at the time, found themselves dispersed.

=== Planning and construction ===
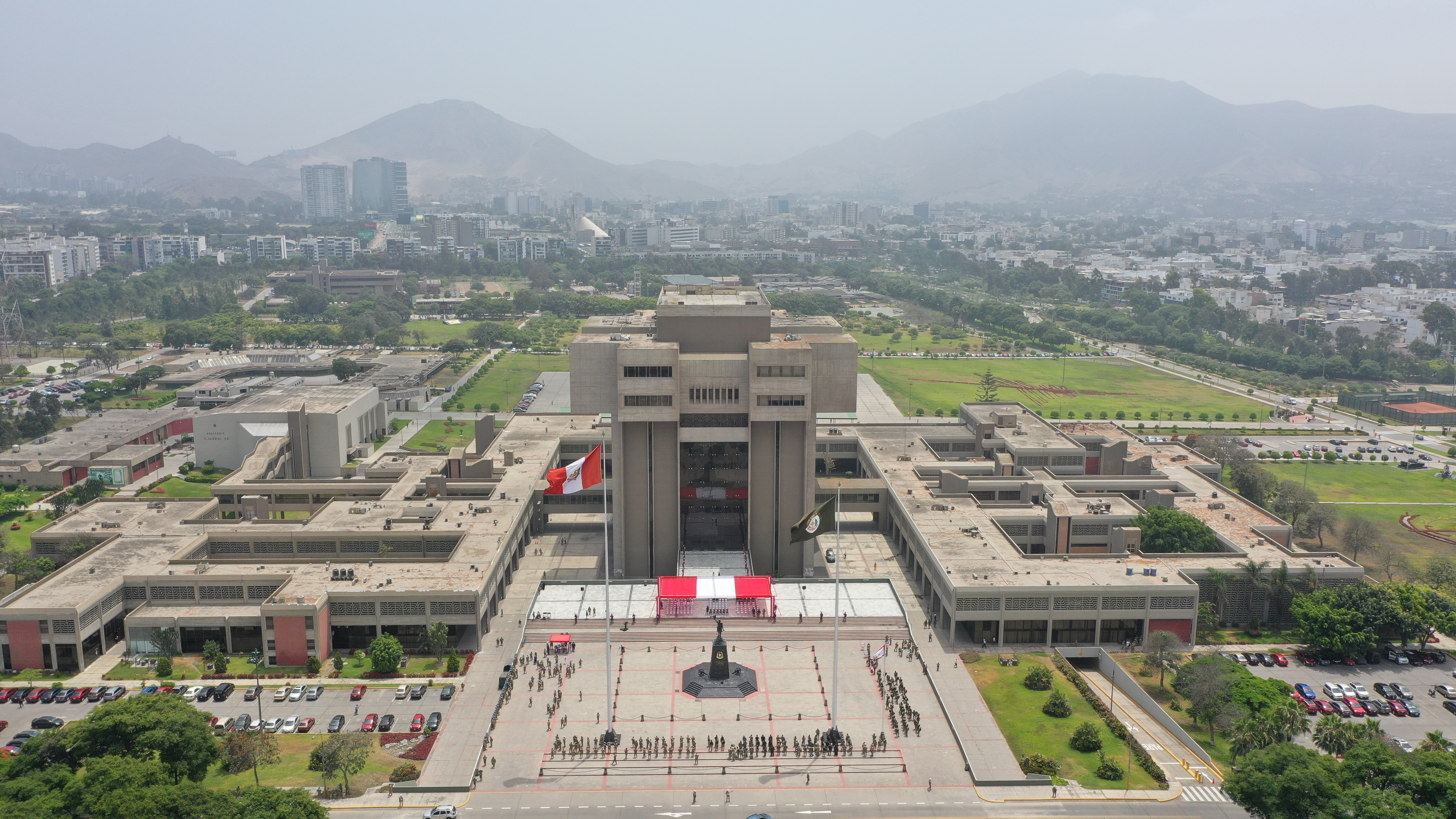
Aerial view in 2020.

In April 1971, the land, then located in the residential neighbourhood of Chacarilla del Estanque, in what was then part of the district of Surco (today San Borja) and with an area of 949,696 m^{2}, was selected and the expropriation process began, whose appraisal was carried out by experts of the Ministry of Housing and Construction, simultaneously the topographic survey was carried out by the Military Geographical Institute. In mid-1971, a group of highly qualified architects was invited to discuss and criticize the preliminary project in order to choose between several alternatives. In October 1971, a coordinated plan between different construction firms under the supervision of the military began, with a deadline of 9 months, with priority to urban rehabilitation.

The project was divided into six sectors. In July 1973, Sector I – the main building – was put out to tender. Construction began on December 5, 1973, with a delivery deadline of December 1, 1974. The rest of the complex followed soon after in December 1973, being awarded in January 1974. Simultaneously, a process of urban reforestation began in both the interior and exterior of the complex with the intent of improving the air quality of the surrounding area.

On January 22, 1975, the official inauguration of the new premises of the Ministry of War Complex was held, with the presence of the then President, Juan Velasco Alvarado, as well as other authorities. It began operating in mid-1976, due to the fact that some installations had not been completed.

== Gallery ==
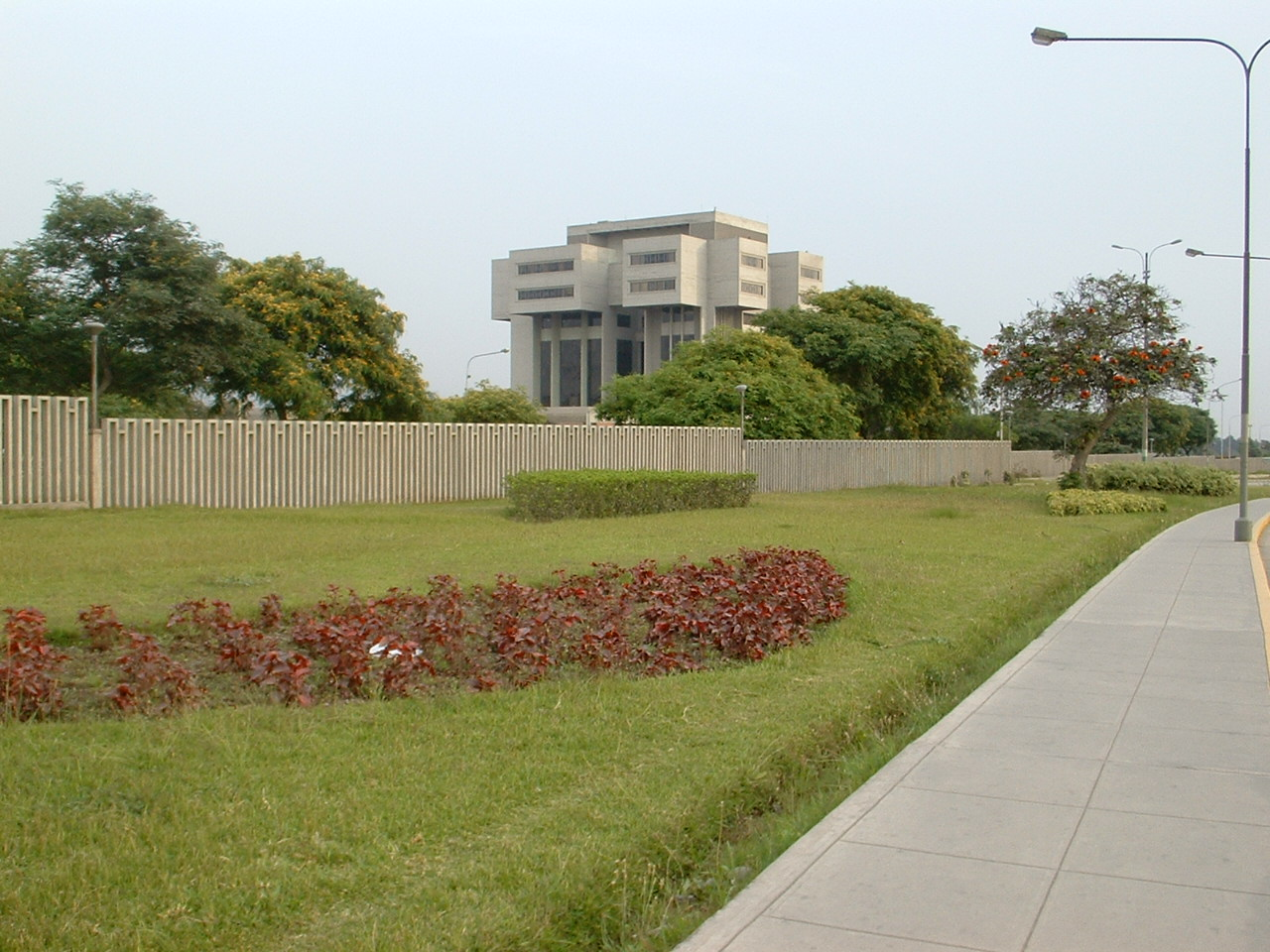
The building complex in December 2006

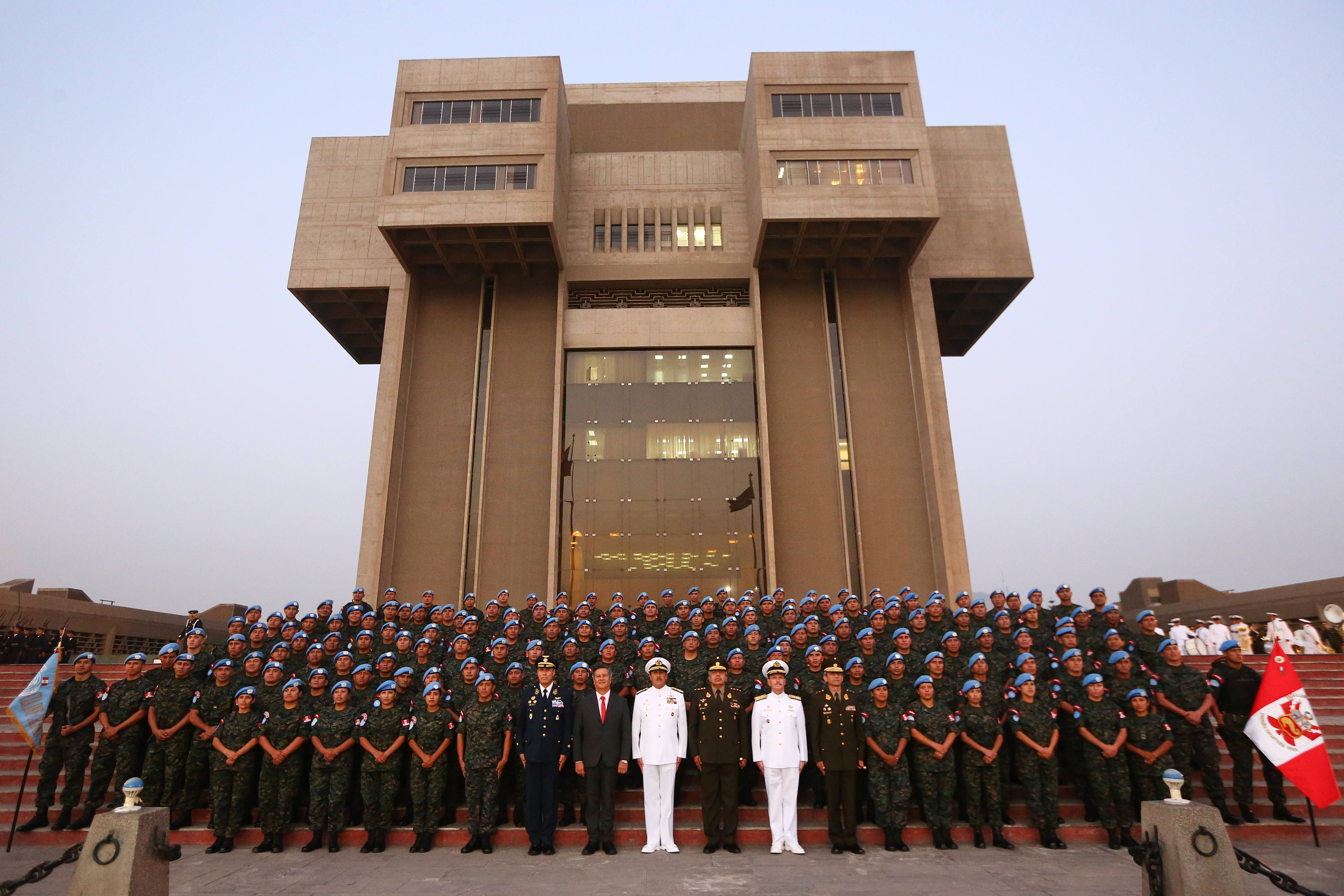
Peruvian Blue helmets in front of the main building after returning from their mission in Haiti

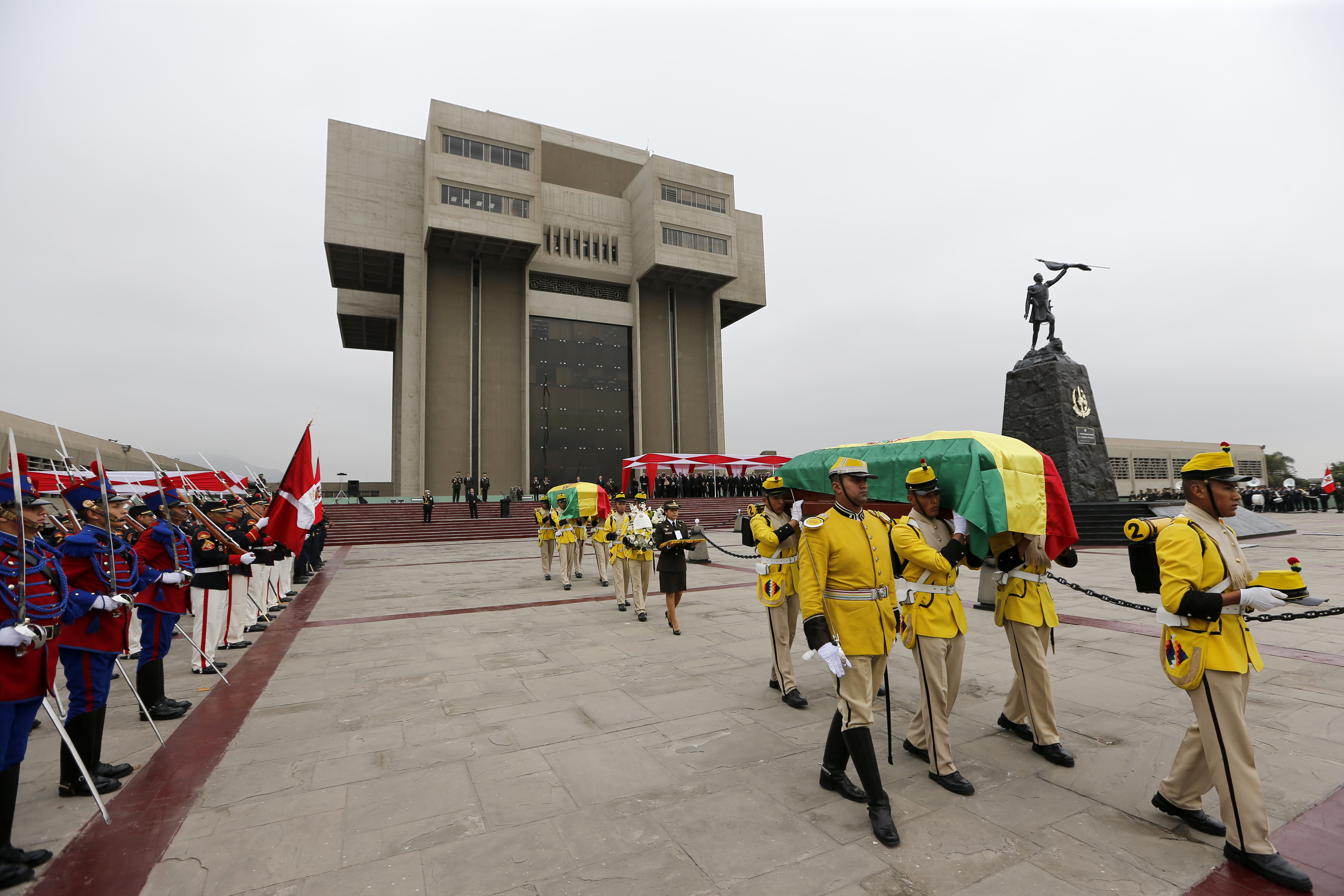
Repatriation ceremony for the remains of two unknown soldiers killed in action in the Battle of Tacna

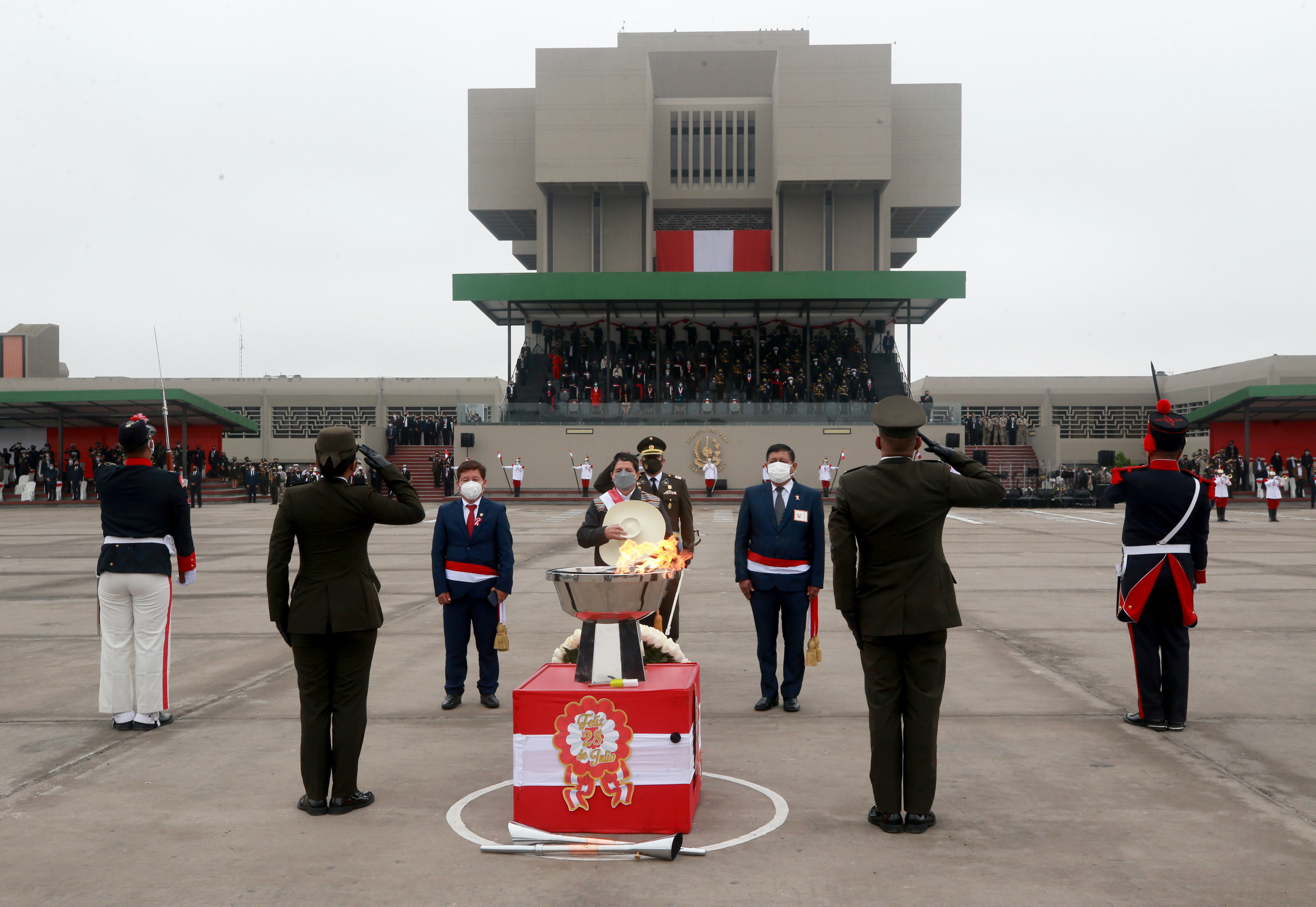
Annual military parade on the occasion of the Bicentennial of Peru

== See also ==
- Military of Peru
- Peruvian Army
- San Borja District
