= Juan Ossio Acuña =

Peruvian anthropologist and politician (born 1943)

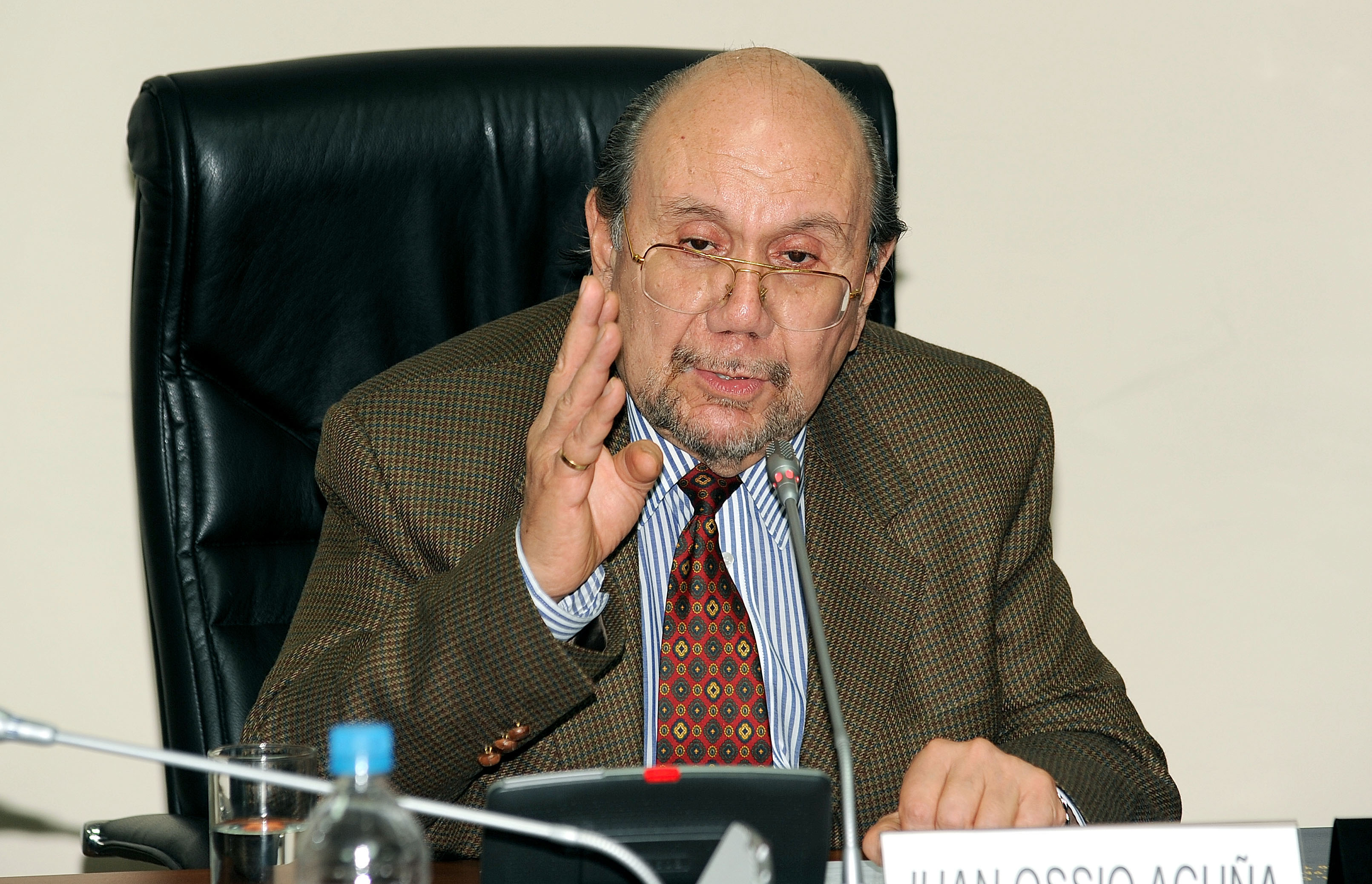

1st Minister of Culture
- In office 4 September 2010 – 28 July 2011
- President: Alan Garcia
- Preceded by: Office established
- Succeeded by: Susana Baca

Personal details
- Born: June 1, 1943 (age 82) Lima, Peru

Juan Ossio Acuña has been the Peruvian Minister of Culture under President Alan García since September 2010. He studied at the National University of San Marcos, and at Linacre College, Oxford. Prior to that, he was a professor at the Pontifical Catholic University of Peru.
