= APEC Peru 2016 =

Economic meeting in Peru

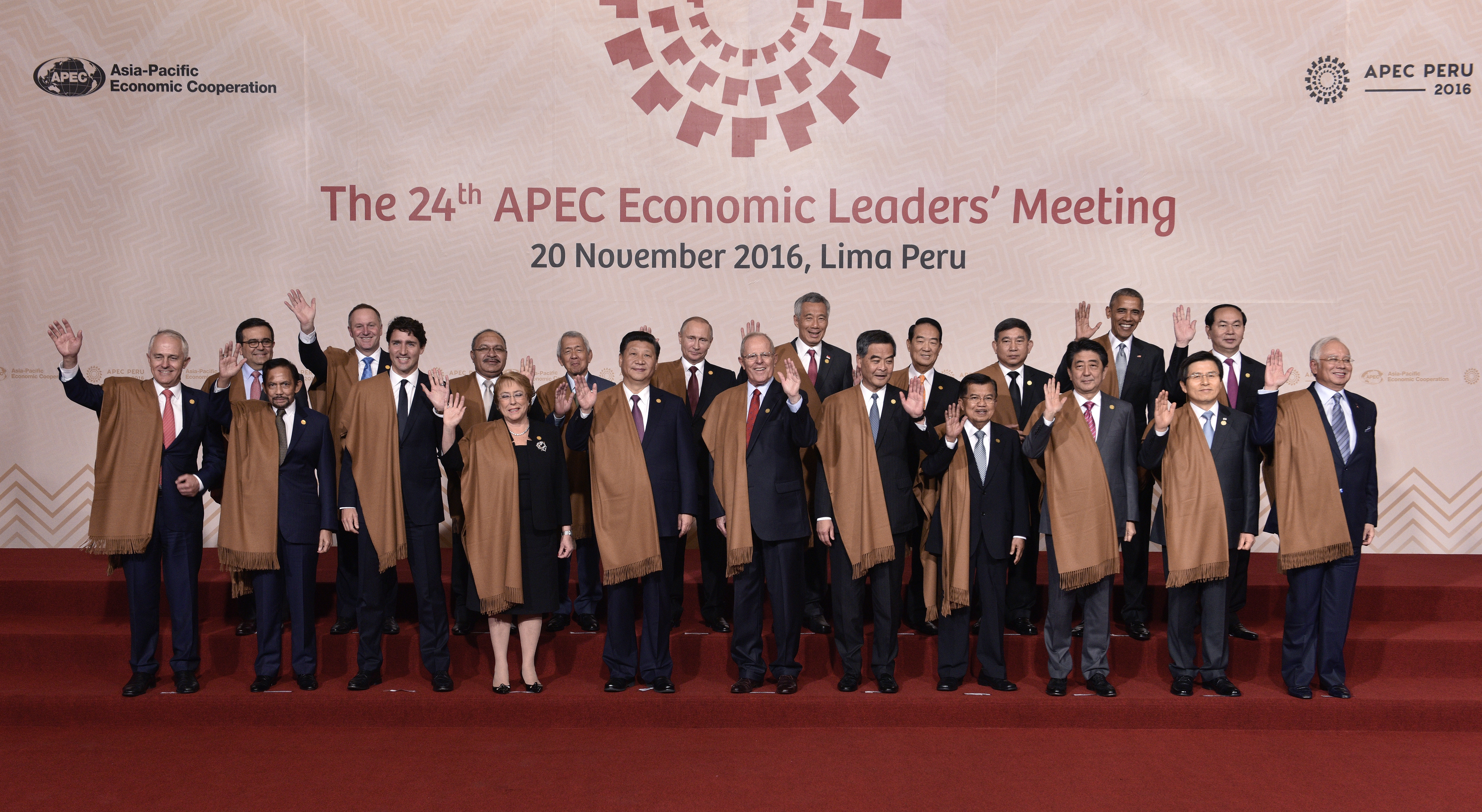
- APEC Peru 2016 delegates
- Host country: Peru
- Date: 19–20 November
- Motto: "Quality Growth and Human Development" (Spanish: Crecimiento de Calidad y Desarrollo Humano)
- Venues: Main venue Lima Convention Center, Lima Other meetings 7 host locations: Lima; Arequipa; Trujillo; Tacna; Piura; Iquitos; Tarapoto
- Follows: APEC Philippines 2015
- Precedes: APEC Vietnam 2017
- Website: apec2016.pe (archived)

APEC Peru 2016 (Spanish: APEC Perú 2016) was the XXVIII year-long hosting of Asia-Pacific Economic Cooperation (APEC) meetings in Peru, which culminated with the XXIV APEC Economic Leaders' Meeting in 19–20 November 2016 in Lima. It marked the second time Peru played host to the APEC, previously hosting in 2008.

== Agenda ==
Four priority areas were laid out as topics to be discussed for the 2016 APEC summit. These are Human Capital Development, Upgrading SMEs, Regional Food Market, and Regional Economic Integration Agenda. These subjects were chosen to build upon on the discussions from the previous APEC summit in the Philippines.

== Branding ==
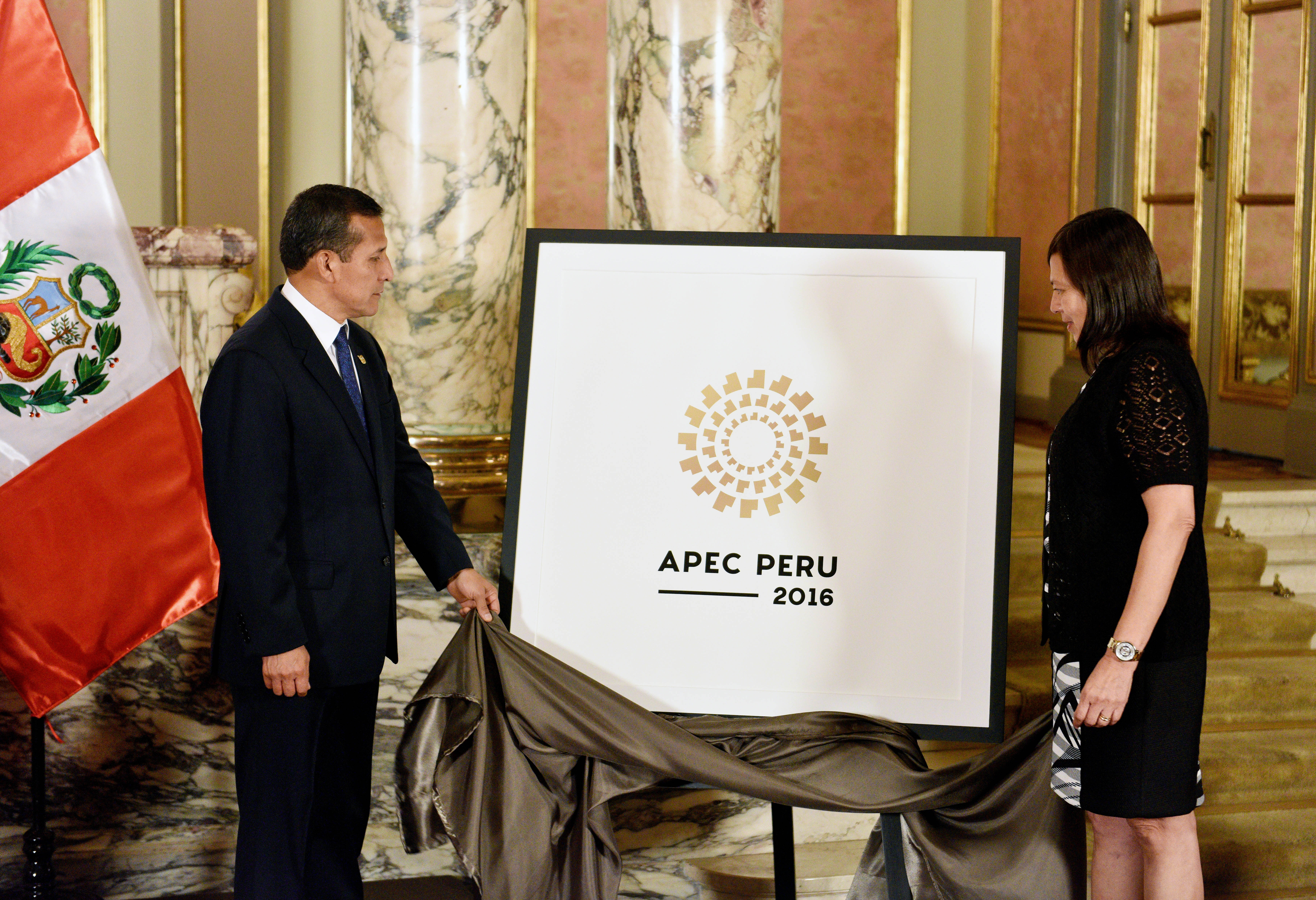
President Ollanta Humala and Foreign Minister Ana María Sánchez unveils the logo of the APEC Summit.

On 29 January 2016, the Peruvian President Ollanta Humala said that the theme of the APEC Summit is "Quality Growth and Human Development". The architecture of the ancient city of Caral serves as the inspiration for the official logo of the APEC summit.

== Preparations ==
On 6 September 2012, then Peruvian Foreign Minister Rafael Roncagliolo announced that Peru will host the APEC Summit on 2016.

The launch ceremony for APEC Peru 2016 was made at the Government Palace in Lima which was led by President Ollanta Humala.

A temporary Multisectoral Working Group (High-Level Extraordinary Commission) was established to aid in the organization of events for the APEC Summit, chaired by Mercedes Aráoz.

== Events ==
=== Economic Leaders' Meeting ===
The Economic Leaders' Meeting was held from 19 to 20 November 2016 at the Lima Convention Center in Lima.

==== Attendees ====
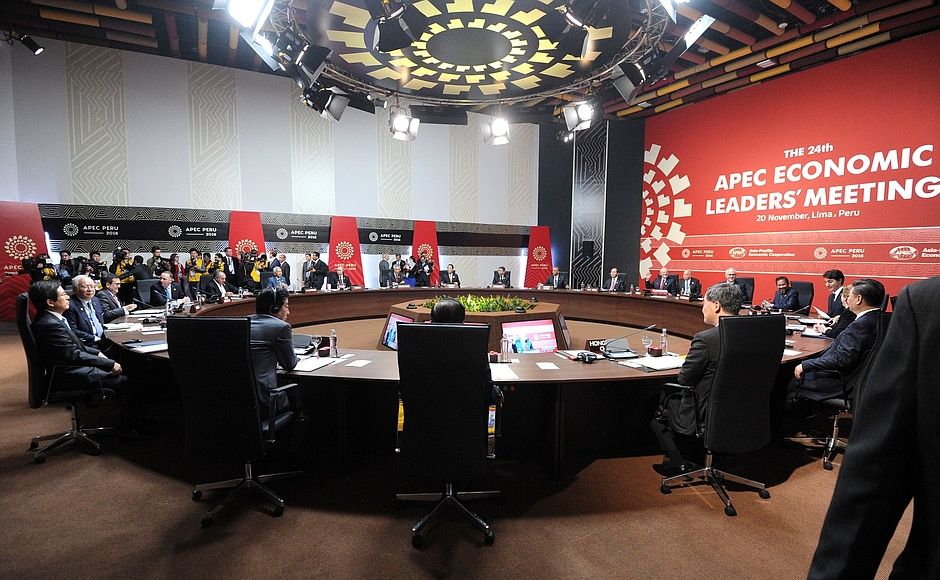
APEC Economic Leader's Meeting on 20 November 2016.

Prior to the Economic Leaders' Meeting, South Korean President Park Geun-hye and Thai Prime Minister Prayuth Chan-ocha decided not to attend in the occasion citing their attendance to address their own domestic issues such as the North Korean nuclear program, as well the 2016 South Korean political scandal and the death and mourning of King Bhumibol Adulyadej, respectively. Park was represented by Prime Minister Hwang Kyo-ahn, while Chan-ocha was represented by his Deputy Prime Minister Prajin Juntong. Indonesian President Joko Widodo also did not attend the summit for the second time consecutively and was again replaced by Vice President Jusuf Kalla; the two had agreed that Widodo would only attend larger global scale conferences while Kalla would attend smaller regional scale conferences like APEC.

This was the first APEC meeting for Vietnamese President Trần Đại Quang, Philippine President Rodrigo Duterte and the host, Peruvian President Pedro Pablo Kuczynski since their inaugurations on 2 April 2016, 30 June 2016 and 28 July 2016, respectively.

It was also the last APEC meeting for United States President Barack Obama (who stepped down on 20 January 2017 following the 2016 U.S. presidential election and the first inauguration of Donald Trump), as well as Hong Kong Chief Executive CY Leung (who stepped down on 1 July 2017 following the 2017 Hong Kong election) and New Zealand Prime Minister John Key (who stepped down on 12 December 2016 following his resignation).

Colombian President Juan Manuel Santos was in attendance as invited guest. The Pacific Alliance member states: Peru, Chile, Mexico, and Colombia will hold a separate summit with APEC leaders.

Attendees at the 2016 APEC Economic Leaders' Meeting
Member economy	Position	Name
Australia	Prime Minister	Malcolm Turnbull
Brunei	Sultan	Hassanal Bolkiah
Canada	Prime Minister	Justin Trudeau
Chile	President	Michelle Bachelet
China	President (Note: The president of China is legally a ceremonial representative with no real power, but the general secretary of the Chinese Communist Party (de facto leader in one-party communist state) has always held this office since 1993 except for the months of transition.)	Xi Jinping
Colombia (invited guests)	President	Juan Manuel Santos
Hong Kong	Chief Executive	Leung Chun-ying
Indonesia*	Vice President	Jusuf Kalla
Japan	Prime Minister	Shinzō Abe
South Korea*	Prime Minister	Hwang Kyo-ahn
Malaysia	Prime Minister	Najib Razak
Mexico	President	Enrique Peña Nieto
New Zealand	Prime Minister	John Key
Papua New Guinea	Prime Minister	Peter O'Neill
Peru	President	Pedro Pablo Kuczynski (host)
Philippines	President	Rodrigo Duterte
Russia	President	Vladimir Putin
Singapore	Prime Minister	Lee Hsien Loong
Taiwan	Special Representative of President	James Soong
Thailand*	Deputy Prime Minister	Prajin Juntong
United States	President	Barack Obama
Vietnam	President (Note: The actual head of government of Vietnam is the Prime Minister. The President of Vietnam is legally the head of state, but the General Secretary of the Communist Party of Vietnam is the practical highest political leader in one-party communist state.)	Trần Đại Quang
(*) Indonesian President Joko Widodo, South Korean President Park Geun-hye and Thai Prime Minister Prayut Chan-o-cha were not able to attend the leaders summit. Representatives of said countries were sent to attend on their behalf.

==== Sideline and bilateral meetings ====
Aside from the Economic Leaders' Meeting itself, some leaders met with each other in separate bilateral meetings within the week of the leaders' meet. The meeting's host, Peruvian President Pedro Kuczynski, also hosted state visits at the Government Palace for Japanese Prime Minister Shinzō Abe and Chinese leader Xi Jinping.

Russian President Vladimir Putin had bilateral meetings with the leaders from China, Japan, Philippines, and Vietnam. He also held bilateral meeting with Kuczynski. South Korean Prime Minister also held a bilateral meeting with Kuczynski.

U.S. President Barack Obama held a bilateral meeting with Australian Prime Minister Malcolm Turnbull, Canadian Prime Minister Justin Trudeau and Chinese leader Xi Jinping.

On a sideline meeting about the Trans-Pacific Partnership (TTP), President Barack Obama briefed leaders of signatory states of the partnership about the status of the treaty, and its support by the US Congress and businessmen. A consensus was reach among the signatory states that the TTP must be realized and will only look for an alternative if the United States later decides not to take part of it. There were concerns over the fate of the treaty due to incoming U.S. President Donald Trump's opposition to the deal. It is reported that if either Japan or the United States back out the treaty won't push through. New Zealand Prime Minister John Key proposed making "cosmetic changes" to make the deal more acceptable to Trump.

== Notes ==
Preceded by APEC Philippines 2015	APEC meetings 2016	Succeeded by APEC Vietnam 2017
