= National Museum of Peru =

Coordinates: 12.254254072811106°S 76.910619590551°W

National Museum of Peru (MUNA)
- Museo Nacional del Perú (MUNA)

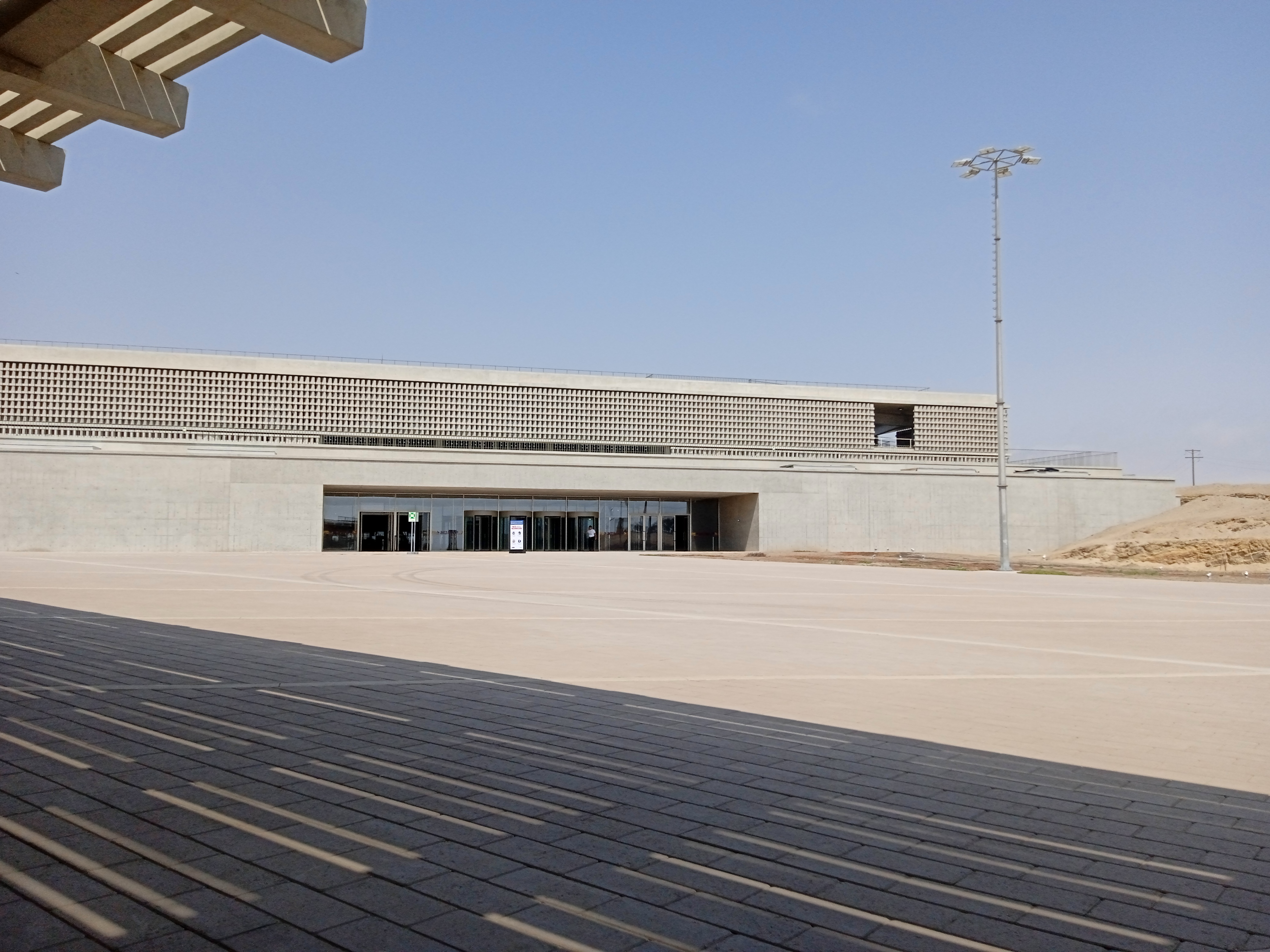
- Main façade of the museum.
- Location: Lurín District, Lima, Peru
- Type: National museum
- Collection size: 500,000
- Owner: Government of Peru
- Website: museos.cultura.pe/museos/museo-nacional-del-perú-muna

The National Museum of Peru is a national museum in Lurín District, Lima, Peru, located within the archaeological zone of Pachacamac. The museum will hold over a half million artifacts of the Pre-Columbian era and Inca Empire, ranging back to 5,000 BCE. It opened in July 2021 as part of Peru's bicentennial celebrations and is capable of accepting 15,000 guests per day.

== History ==
=== Planning and construction ===
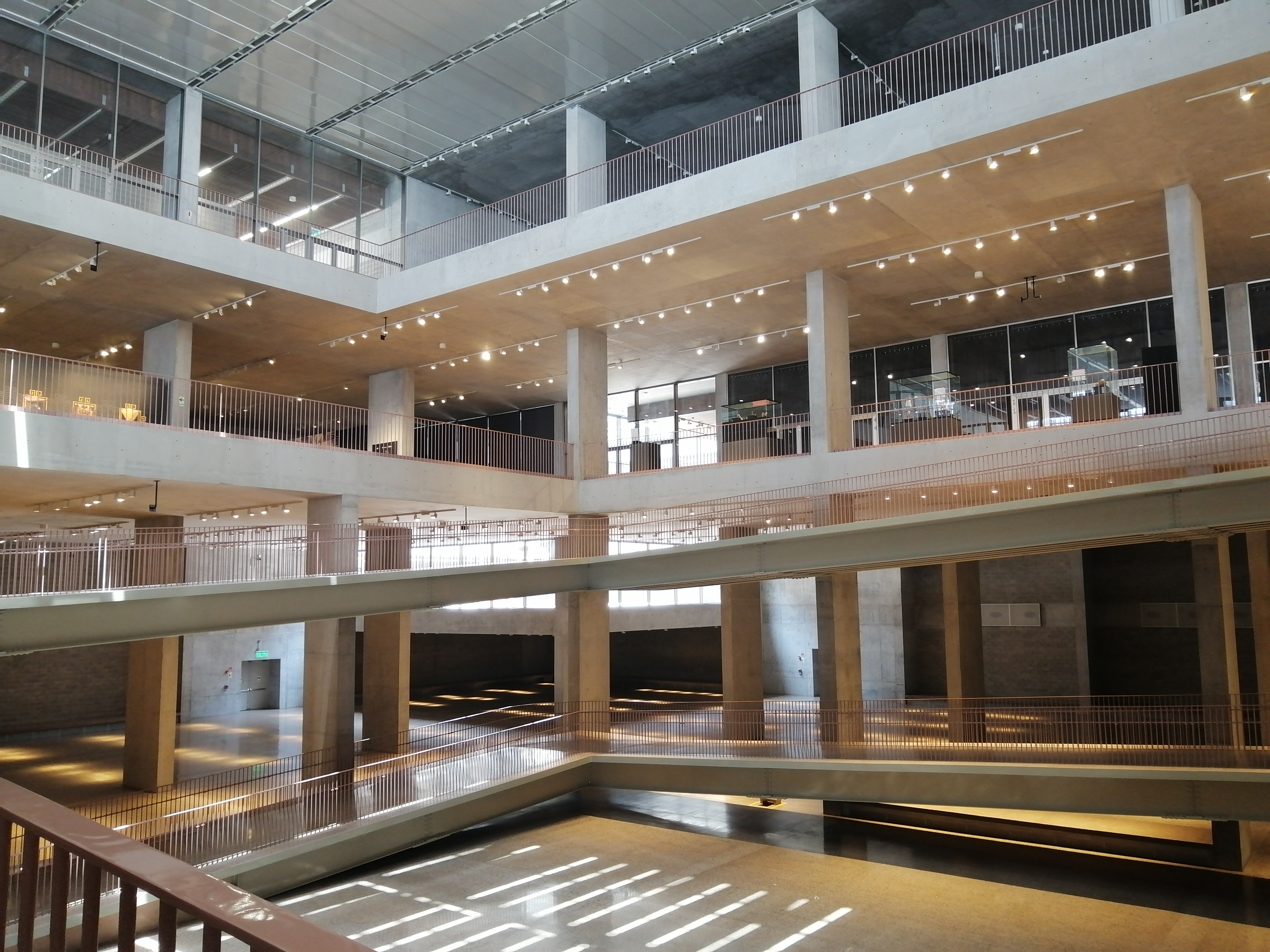
The design of the museum promotes accessibility through ramps.

Ideas for a national museum were first proposed by José de San Martín in 1822 when he proposed a national museum, library and archive to be constructed during the Peruvian War of Independence. The idea was promoted again nearly two centuries later by Minister of Culture Diana Álvarez Calderón during the administration of President Ollanta Humala in 2013. Humala had initial plans for a museum in Peruvian Amazonia, though Álvarez Calderón urged him to dedicate a national museum to Peru first, with ideas of creating a National Museum of Peru.

In May 2014, bidding for the project's design was announced. The location was debated as the museum's site was not located in central Lima, instead being placed in the Pachacamac archaeological zone, a location that was sacred for pre-Columbian cultures. The proposed site led to controversy, with some intellectuals and officials excluding themselves from the project. Supporters said that the location provided the most publicly-owned space available for a museum and approved the symbolism of the Pachacamac site continuing to be a location bringing cultures together.

Architect Alexia León Ángel won the competition and described the design as an infrastructure project, providing an open canvas blueprint that would bridge the various cultural artifacts from Peru's history, stating "the architecture recognises that culture is in the process of ongoing construction". The plan involved filling the new museum with pieces from the Museo de la Nación – the former Ministry of Fisheries headquarters from 1970 – and the National Museum of Archaeology, Anthropology and History of Peru, which was outdated and did not have proper equipment to maintain the temperature and lighting of displays. The process for safely transferring the items from other sites to the museum was anticipated to take about twenty years. Another area for more contemporary objects was also planned to fill the 70,000 square metres (750,000 ft^{2}) of space. By late-2017, planned areas for recreation and administration were removed to lower costs, with the seven-story museum's area being set at 65,000 square metres (700,000 ft^{2}).

Describing the museum's preservation design, Architectural Review wrote:

This project is an open network, future-proofed structurally, programatically and technically. The design separates the different lives of its systems, considering the unstable climatic future. The structure is designed to last a minimum of 500 years that could well be 2000, (a short time in relation to the pre-Columbian objects it aims to protect) and is spatially independent from the mechanical installations which are thought to last 30-50 years and adapt to the changing conditions and technology. It is a tsunami-proofed response that critically addresses the responsibilities of a new building.

About 70% of MUNA is located under the ground level. A cement structure designed to have a cross-like appearance of chakana from above, a central atrium features surrounding ramps that spiral up to floors that feature exhibits on the periphery. The construction cost of the museum was about 500 million Peruvian soles, or about $125 million USD, the equivalent of $145 million in 2024.

=== Operation ===
During the government of Francisco Sagasti, the Ministry of Culture announced in November 2020 that the museum was destined to open in July 2021 for the celebration of Peru's two-hundredth anniversary of independence. In late July 2021, MUNA opened to the public with a limited display in four galleries. One gallery featured information about the museum's background and construction while another highlighted how Peru's antiquities and culture were exploited by illicit trade.

==== Suspension of operations ====
In 2021, MUNA was expected to be fully operational by 2024. By 2023, the Architectural Review reported that the COVID-19 pandemic in Peru and political crisis that saw revolving presidencies and culture ministers resulted with institutional abandonment of the museum and exhibits still remaining empty in MUNA. Infrastructure challenges including poor road access, ceiling leaks, the lack of a groundwater pumping system and a malfunctioning climate control system also proved to make operation of MUNA difficult.

On 14 December 2024, the Ministry of Culture announced the suspension of operations of MUNA.

== See also ==
- Pachacamac
- Southern Cone of Lima
- National Museum of Archaeology, Anthropology and History of Peru
