= Museo de la Nación =

Former museum in Lima, Peru

Coordinates: 12.0868°S 77.0019°W

Museum of the Nation
- Museo de la Nación
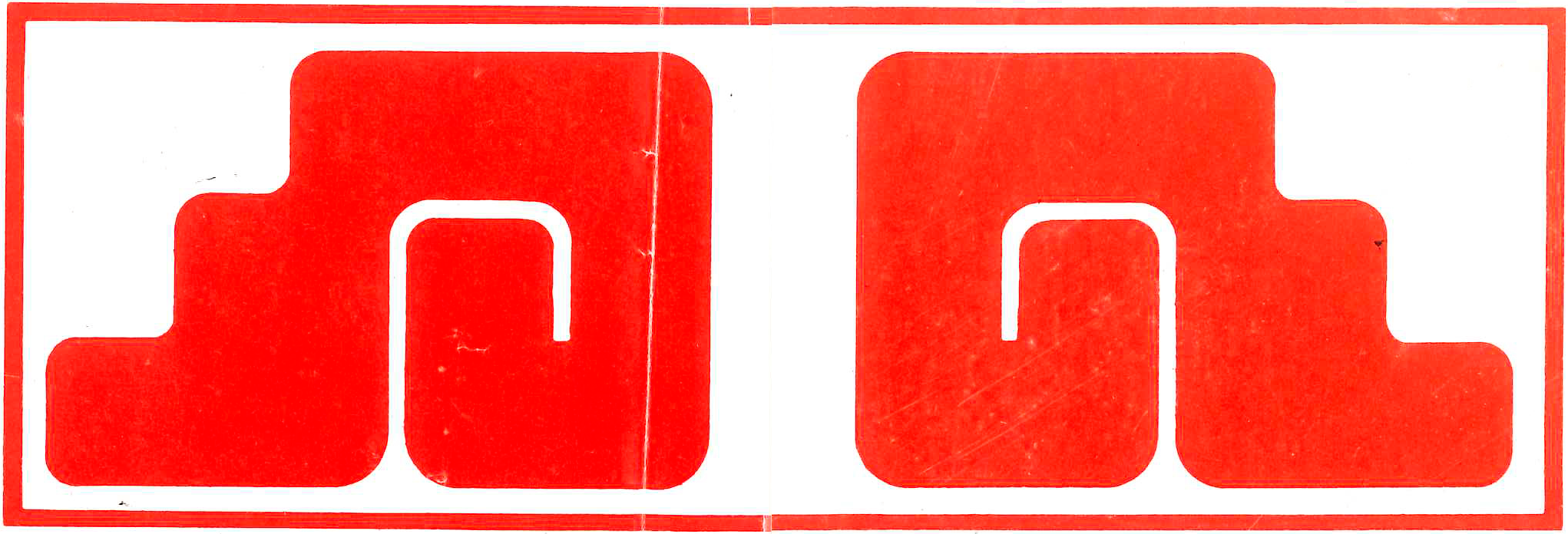

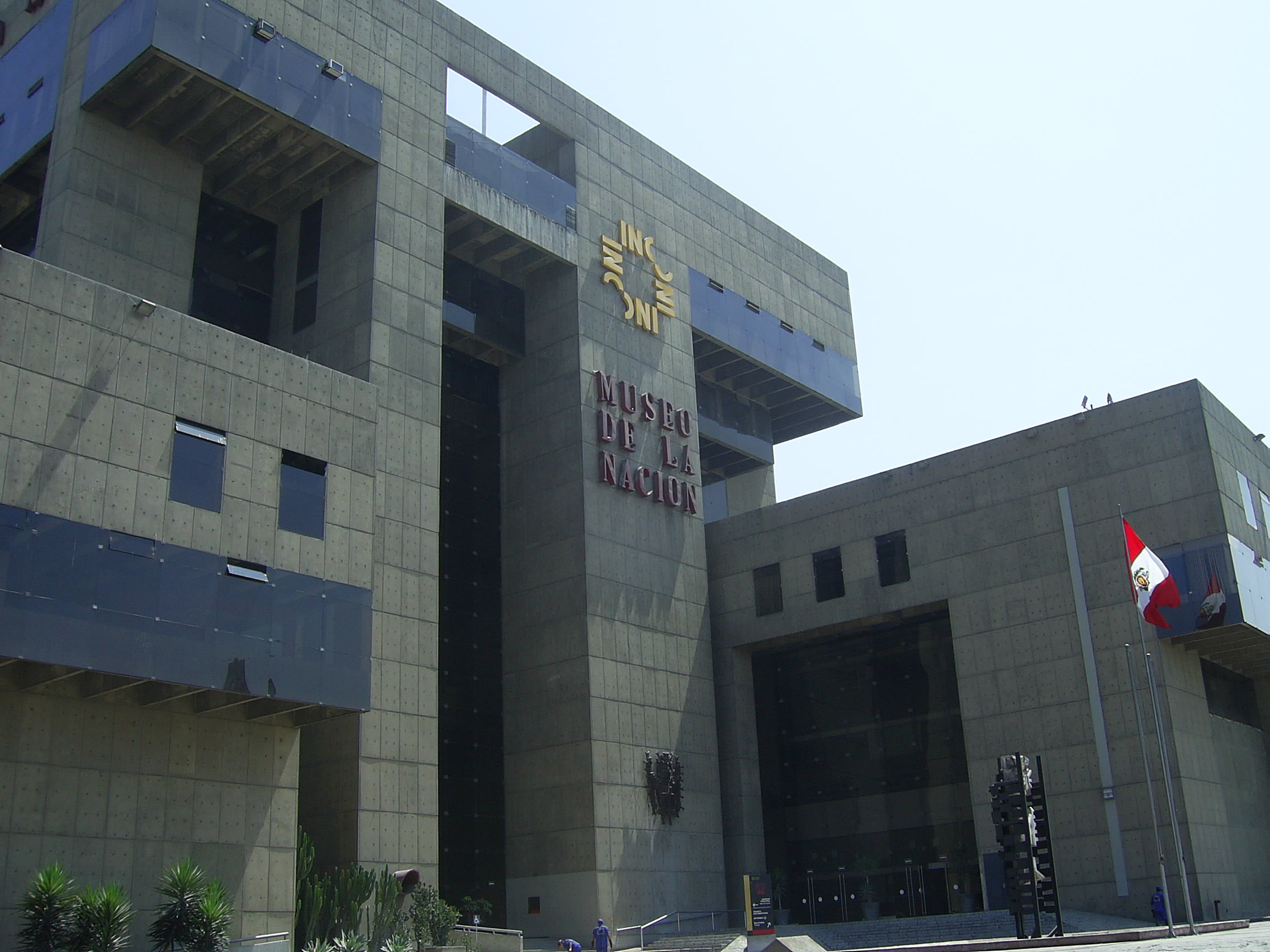
- The building in 2007
- Established: 14 March 1988
- Dissolved: 2014
- Location: San Borja District, Lima
- Type: Art and history museum
- Owner: Ministry of Culture
- Website: Archived website

The Museum of the Nation (Spanish: Museo de la Nación) was a public art and history museum in San Borja District, Lima, Peru. The museum was inaugurated in 1990 and functioned at a brutalist building originally built as a government complex. Its permanent exhibit was shut down in 2014 in favour of the National Museum of Peru, instead being used for temporary displays.

The museum housed thousands of artifacts spanning the entirety of Peru's history, including a collection of Moche, Nazca, and Wari ceramics. The museum also houses reproductions of many famous ancient Andean artifacts, most notably the Lanzón from Chavín de Huantar; a recreation of the burial chamber of the Lord of Sipan; and the Revolt of the Objects Mural.

== History ==
On March 14, 1980, then president Alan García decreed the organisation of a national museum. A project was approved on March 14, 1988, after which the museum was inaugurated on February 19, 1990. In 2009, then director of the museum, Marisol Ginocchio, announced the reopening of the museum using four of the building's floors and expanding its collection to include the country's contemporary history. On July 8, 2014, the museum's permanent exhibit was permanently closed in favour of the National Museum of Peru, instead being used for temporary displays. The only permanent exhibit that remained open was a photographic exhibit called "Yuyanapaq. Para Recordar," on the 6th floor of the museum. This exhibit was created by the Truth and Reconciliation Commission to document the internal conflict in Peru.

In May 2017, Minister Salvador del Solar announced that the museum would relaunch as a culture centre, but his resignation effectively cancelled the project.

== See also ==
- List of museums in Peru
- National Museum of Archaeology, Anthropology and History of Peru
