= National Library of Peru =

National library, cultural heritage site in Peru

- Biblioteca Nacional del Perú
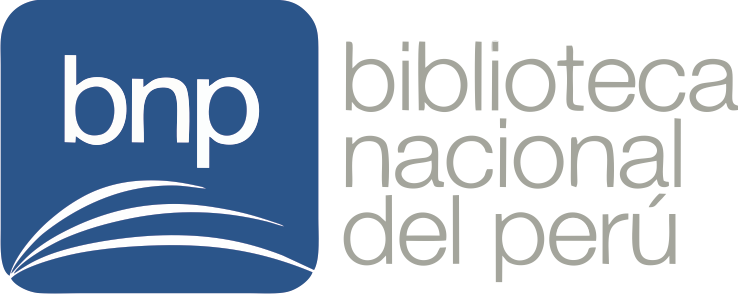

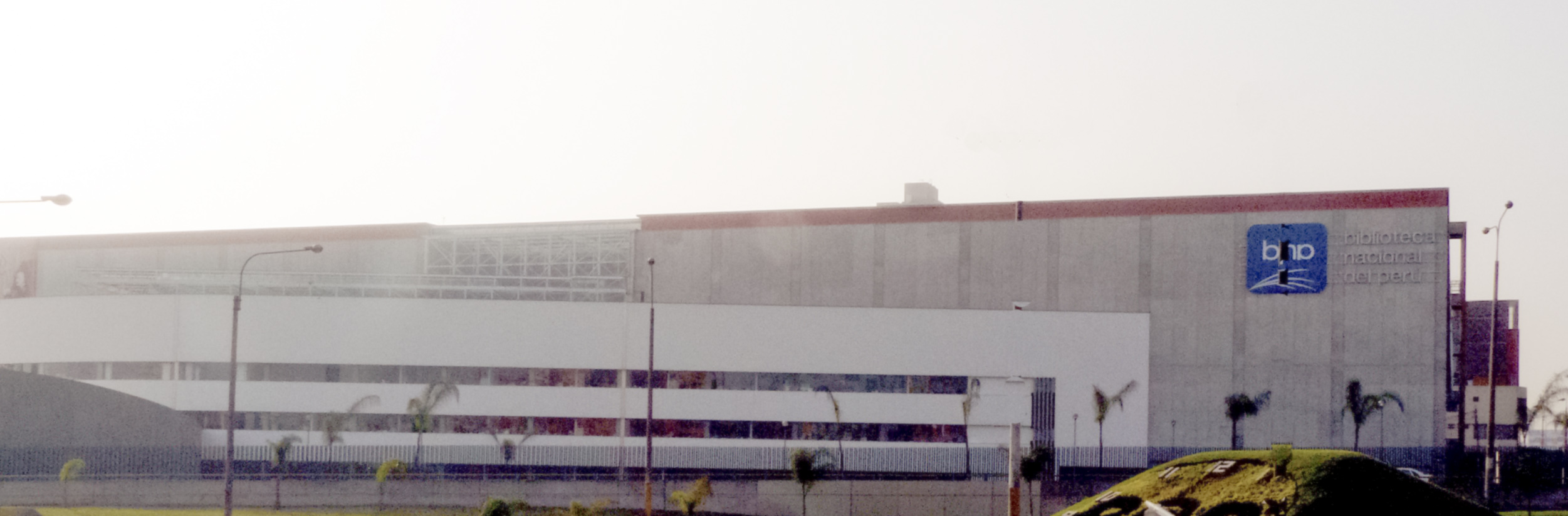
- Facade of the modern San Borja District branch facing Javier Prado Avenue
- 12°3′0″S 77°1′42″W (Lima district branch)
- Location: Lima, Peru
- Established: 1821
- Branches: 2 (in Lima District and in San Borja District)

Collection
- Items collected: Books, newspapers, magazines, manuscripts, historical documents, microforms, films, photographs, sound and music recordings, etc.
- Size: 7 million
- Legal deposit: Yes

Access and use
- Access requirements: Reader card
- Circulation: Non-circulating

Other information
- Budget: S/. 32.1 million (2014)
- Director: Juan Yangali Quintanilla
- Website: www.bnp.gob.pe

The National Library of Peru (Spanish: Biblioteca Nacional del Perú) is the national library of Peru, located in Lima. It is the country's oldest and most important library. Like the majority of Peruvian libraries, it is a non-circulating library. It has two branches: the old building is on Abancay Avenue (in Lima District) and the modern building is on Avenida Javier Prado (in San Borja District). Both are open to the public.

== History ==
The library was founded by José de San Martín in 1821, after he donated his collection of books and praised the new library as: "... one of the most efficient mediums to place into circulation our intellectual values". The library has various duties, among which it must formulate, conduct, supervise, and evaluate the fulfillment of policies and plans of development of library service within a national and international sphere for educational purposes. These and other administrative decisions concerning the library also depend on the ministry of education of the country.

Historically, the library has passed through various phases of restructurion since its foundation. During the War of the Pacific, the Chilean army, after taking Lima, ransacked various items along with much capital stock from the library. Peruvian author and scholar Ricardo Palma, who was director of the library in 1884, noted in one of his recounts that of the 56,000 works the library possessed before the war, only 378 were left at the end of the occupation. In 2007, 3,778 books were returned to Peru from Chile. There are current talks between the director of the library and Chilean authorities on identifying works which might belong to Peru that would be eventually returnable. Another significant event the library has gone through was a fire which almost completely destroyed the grounds of the library on 10 May 1943, in which various highly valued historical works were lost. A new building was erected on the same grounds of the old library along with a training center for future librarian administrators.

== Modernization ==
The National Library of Peru is currently undergoing a modernization program which aspires to turn the library into one of Latin America's most modern libraries. It is located in Lima's San Borja District. After years of financial planning for the new building, the government of Peru financially collaborated to finish the building, along with a loan of up to seven million dollars from Spain to equip the new library with modern equipment. According to official sources from the library, it is said to have a bibliographic patrimony valued at around 400 million dollars. Among historical works the library has is the first book printed in Lima in 1584 along with other historical books dating back to colonial times. The new library will also attempt to connect to other Peruvian libraries in an effort to create an online national catalog of books and other materials for better research.

The new library was officially inaugurated on 27 March 2006. To mark the occasion, the then Minister of Education, Javier Sota Nadal, commissioned a symphonic poem from Peruvian composer Jimmy Lopez. The work titled, "America Salvaje", is inspired by the poem "Blasón" by José Santos Chocano. President Alejandro Toledo and National Library director Sinesio López were present at the inauguration.

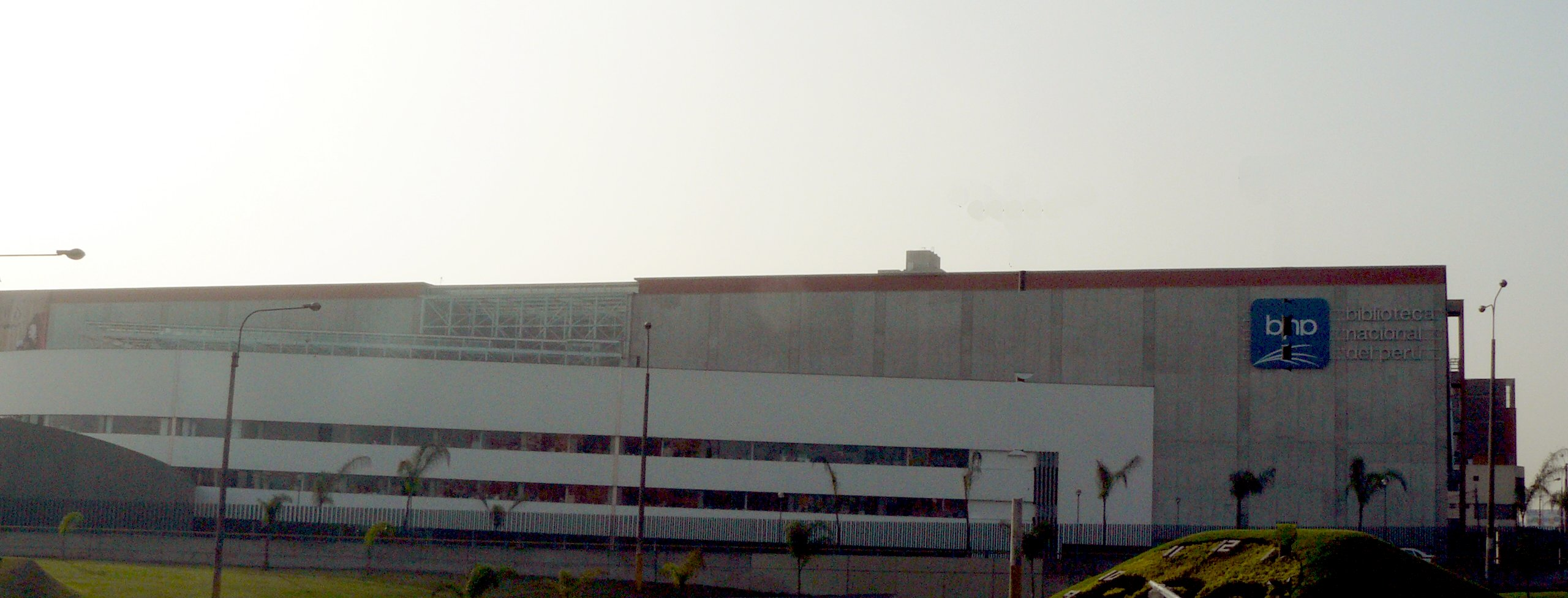
The new library's building in San Borja District

== National Library System of Peru ==
The National Library (Biblioteca Nacional) is the head of the Sistema Nacional de Bibliotecas (SNB) del Perú.

== See also ==
- List of Chilean-Peruvian controversies
- List of Jesuit sites
