= List of Lima and Callao Metro stations =

This is a list of Lima and Callao Metro stations in Peru.

== List of stations ==
Line	Name	Transfer	City	Opened
Line 1	Villa El Salvador		Lima	28 April 1990
Line 1	Parque Industrial		Lima	28 April 1990
Line 1	Pumacahua		Lima	28 April 1990
Line 1	Villa María		Lima	28 April 1990
Line 1	María Auxiliadora		Lima	28 April 1990
Line 1	San Juan		Lima	28 April 1990
Line 1	Atocongo		Lima	28 April 1990
Line 1	Jorge Chávez		Lima	11 July 2011
Line 1	Ayacucho		Lima	11 July 2011
Line 1	Cabitos		Lima	11 July 2011
Line 1	Angamos		Lima	11 July 2011
Line 1	San Borja Sur		Lima	11 July 2011
Line 1	La Cultura		Lima	11 July 2011
Line 1	Arriola		Lima	11 July 2011
Line 1	Gamarra		Lima	11 July 2011
Line 1	Miguel Grau		Lima	11 July 2011
Line 1	El Ángel		Lima	12 May 2014
Line 1	Presbítero Maestro		Lima	12 May 2014
Line 1	Caja de Agua		Lima	12 May 2014
Line 1	Pirámide del Sol		Lima	12 May 2014
Line 1	Los Jardines		Lima	12 May 2014
Line 1	Los Postes		Lima	12 May 2014
Line 1	San Carlos		Lima	12 May 2014
Line 1	San Martín		Lima	12 May 2014
Line 1	Santa Rosa		Lima	12 May 2014
Line 1	Bayóvar		Lima	12 May 2014
Line 2	Evitamiento		Lima	21 December 2023
Line 2	Óvalo Santa Anita		Lima	21 December 2023
Line 2	Colectora Industrial		Lima	21 December 2023
Line 2	Hermilio Valdizán		Lima	21 December 2023
Line 2	Mercado Santa Anita		Lima	21 December 2023

== Stations under construction and planning ==
Line	Name	Transfer	City	Expected opening
Line 2	Puerto del Callao		Callao	2028
Line 2	Buenos Aires		Callao	2028
Line 2	Juan Pablo II		Callao	2028
Line 2	Insurgentes		Callao	2028
Line 2 Line 4	Carmen de La Legua		Callao	2028 and 2026, respectively
Line 2	Óscar R. Benavides		Callao	2028
Line 2	San Marcos		Lima	2028
Line 2	Elio		Lima	2028
Line 2	La Alborada		Lima	2028
Line 2	Tingo María		Lima	2028
Line 2	Parque Murillo		Lima	2028
Line 2	Plaza Bolognesi		Lima	2028
Line 2	Estación Central	Metropolitano	Lima	2028
Line 2	Plaza Manco Cápac		Lima	2028
Line 2	Cangallo		Lima	2028
Line 2	28 de Julio	Line 1	Lima	2028
Line 2	Nicolás Ayllón		Lima	2028
Line 2	Circunvalación		Lima	2028
Line 2	San Juan de Dios		Lima	2028
Line 2	Vista Alegre		Lima	2028
Line 2	Prolongación Javier Prado		Lima	2028
Line 2	Municipalidad de Ate		Lima	2028
Line 3	Tungasuca		Lima	Under planning
Line 3	El Pinar		Lima	Under planning
Line 3	El Álamo		Lima	Under planning
Line 3	Huandoy		Lima	Under planning
Line 3	2 de Octubre		Lima	Under planning
Line 3	Villa Sol		Lima	Under planning
Line 3	Naranjal		Lima	Under planning
Line 3	Carlos Izaguirre		Lima	Under planning
Line 3	Tomás Valle		Lima	Under planning
Line 3	Bartolomé de las Casas		Lima	Under planning
Line 3	José Granda		Lima	Under planning
Line 3	Caquetá		Lima	Under planning
Line 3	Tacna		Lima	Under planning
Line 3	Garcilaso de la Vega		Lima	Under planning
Line 3	Estación Central	Line 2 Metropolitano	Lima	Under planning
Line 3	Museo de Historia Natural		Lima	Under planning
Line 3	César Canevaro		Lima	Under planning
Line 3	Conde de San Isidro	Line 4	Lima	Under planning
Line 3	Andrés Aramburú		Lima	Under planning
Line 3	Huaca Pucllana		Lima	Under planning
Line 3	Parque Central de Miraflores		Lima	Under planning
Line 3	Parque Reducto		Lima	Under planning
Line 3	Panamá		Lima	Under planning
Line 3	Juana Alarco		Lima	Under planning
Line 3	Cabitos	Line 1	Lima	Under planning
Line 3	Alejandro Velasco		Lima	Under planning
Line 3	Las Gardenias		Lima	Under planning
Line 3	Los Héroes		Lima	Under planning
Line 3	Pedro Miotta		Lima	Under planning
Line 4	Gambetta		Callao	2026
Line 4	Canta Callao		Callao	2026
Line 4	Bocanegra		Callao	2026
Line 4	Aeropuerto Jorge Chávez		Callao	2026
Line 4	El Olivar		Callao	2026
Line 4	Quilca		Callao	2026
Line 4	Morales Duárez		Callao	2026
Line 4	Venezuela		Lima	Under planning
Line 4	Rafael Escardó		Lima	Under planning
Line 4	Pando		Lima	Under planning
Line 4	José de Sucre		Lima	Under planning
Line 4	Brasil		Lima	Under planning
Line 4	Felipe Salaverry		Lima	Under planning
Line 4	Guillermo Prescott		Lima	Under planning
Line 4	Las Palmeras		Lima	Under planning
Line 4	Conde de San Isidro	Line 3	Lima	Under planning
Line 4	Rivera Navarrete	Metropolitano	Lima	Under planning
Line 4	Pablo Carriquirry		Lima	Under planning
Line 4	La Cultura	Line 1	Lima	Under planning
Line 4	San Luis		Lima	Under planning
Line 4	Monterrico		Lima	Under planning
Line 4	Manuel Olguin		Lima	Under planning
Line 4	Los Frutales		Lima	Under planning
Line 4	La Molina		Lima	Under planning
Line 4	Santa Patricia		Lima	Under planning
Line 4	Mayorazgo		Lima	Under planning
Line 4	Mercado Santa Anita	Line 2	Lima	Under planning
