= Avenida Aviación =

Street in Lima, Peru

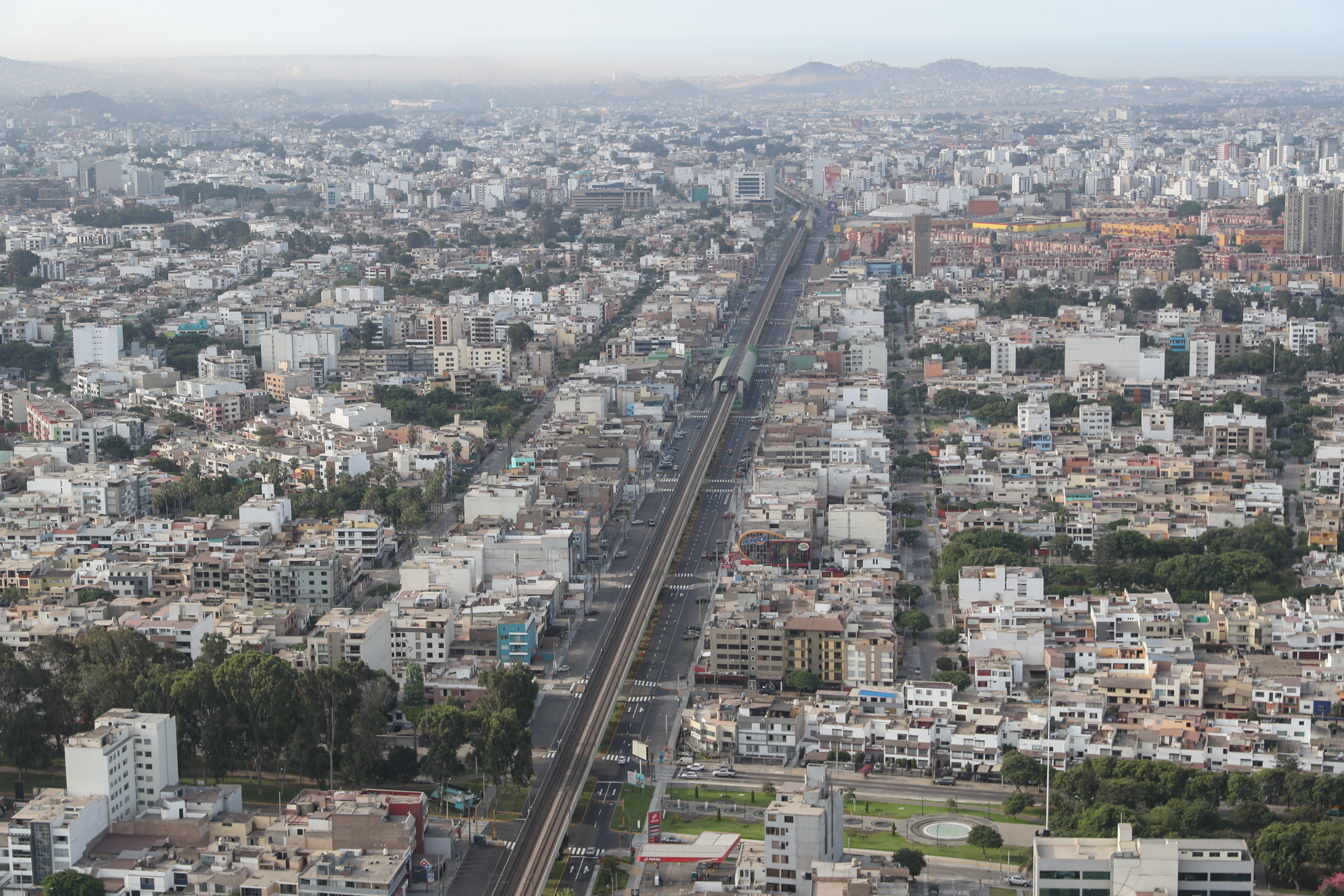
- Aerial view
- Namesake: Peruvian Air Force
- From: Miguel Grau Avenue
- Major junctions: See list: Avenida 28 de Julio; Avenida México; Avenida Nicolás Arriola; Avenida Canadá; Avenida Javier Prado; Avenida San Borja Norte; Avenida San Borja Sur; Avenida Angamos Este
- To: Óvalo Higuereta

Aviation Avenue (Spanish: Avenida Aviación) is a major avenue of Lima, Peru. It extends from north to south along 51 blocks, connecting Miguel Grau Avenue with Higuereta Roundabout, while passing through the districts of Lima, La Victoria, San Luis, San Borja, Surquillo, and Santiago de Surco. It has a train path located along its entire central berm.

== History ==
Originally an open-air avenue, it was chosen as the route for the overhead train system that would connect Villa El Salvador with San Juan de Lurigancho during Alan García's first presidency during the 1980s. On October 17, 1986, a cornerstone was placed at Higuereta Roundabout by García during a ceremony also attended by then mayor Jorge del Castillo. After a series of setbacks, the work was not continued after García left office, and remained incomplete until his second presidency, when it resumed in 2009 under Brazilian conglomerate Odebrecht. The service was inaugurated in 2011, although it was not completed until 2014.

In 2013, it was the sixth avenue in the city with the most traffic. Operations by the National Police of Peru and the Metropolitan Municipality of Lima against street vendors took place in the 2010s.

== Route ==
The avenue begins south of Dos de Mayo National Hospital located at Miguel Grau Avenue, in Barrios Altos. Likewise, at this point, Line 1 of the Lima and Callao Metro enters the avenue. The road passes through the informal market of Tacora, where ambulatory commerce predominates in the surrounding streets and passages.

At the intersection with 28 de Julio Avenue, the avenue enters La Victoria district. At this point, the road delimits to the west with the Gamarra Commercial Emporium, and to the east with the La Parada area. Likewise, it has a great abundance of street commerce, especially on the Gamarra side. At the intersection with Jaime Bausate and Meza avenues, El Migrante José María Arguedas Park is located. Then, at the intersection with Hipólito Unanue street is a metro station. Passing the intersection with Isabel la Católica Avenue, there are stores selling computer accessories and smartphones. Next, there is the Gama Moda Plaza shopping centre. Passing the intersection with México Avenue, the Gamarra and La Parada areas culminate, and at the same time the road becomes less busy. From this point onwards there are stores selling parts and accessories for vehicles and machines. Another metro station is located prior to its intersection with Nicolás Arriola Avenue.

From the intersection with Nicolás Arriola Avenue, the road becomes calmer and relatively safer as it crosses the residential area of Túpac Amaru, belonging to the districts of La Victoria and San Luis, at both ends. Later, the avenue passes in front of the National Sports Village and the headquarters of the Peruvian Football Federation, located on the side of the San Luis district. From the intersection with Canada Avenue, the road resumes its commercial and bustling character; however, with better public management.

Further ahead are the National Library of Peru, the Grand National Theatre and a metro station at the intersection with Javier Prado Este Avenue, also close to the Museum of the Nation and the Ministry of Culture. The road then enters a much more commercial area until it reaches Angamos Avenue, where it continues until it reaches Cabitos or Higuereta roundabout, where another metro station is located.

== Transport ==
The avenue is open to vehicular traffic in its entirety. It is one of the most congested in the city.

=== Metro service ===
The Lima and Callao Metro's Line 1 operates alongside the avenue. Six stations are located in its path: Gamarra, Arriola, La Cultura, San Borja Sur, Angamos, and Cabitos.

== See also ==
- Lima and Callao Metro
