= Angamos metro station =

Lima metro station

Angamos
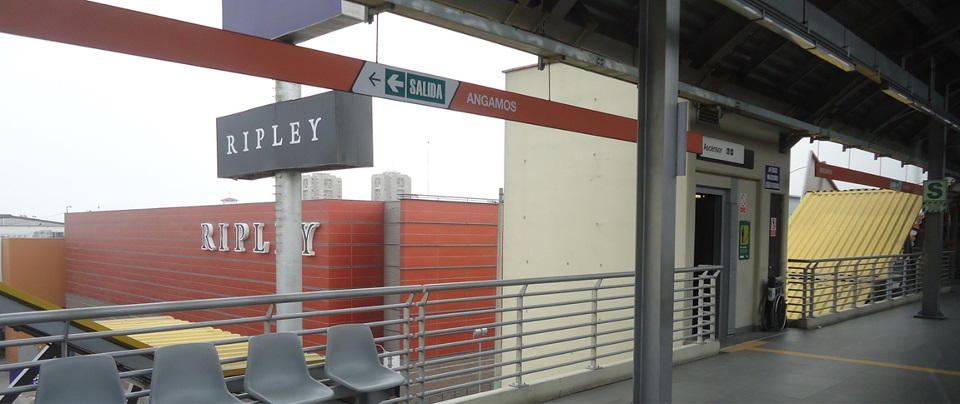
- Angamos station in 2013

General information
- Location: Lima; Peru
- Coordinates: 12°06′48.7″S 77°01′33.7″W
- System: Lima and Callao Metro station
- Line: Line 1

History
- Opened: 11 July 2011

Services
Preceding station	Lima and Callao Metro	Following station
Cabitos toward Villa El Salvador	Line 1	San Borja Sur toward Bayóvar
Location

Angamos is a Lima and Callao Metro station on Line 1. The station is located between Cabitos and San Borja Sur. It was opened on 11 July 2011 as part of the extension of the line from Atocongo to Miguel Grau. The full revenue service started on 3 January 2012.

== See also ==
- Angamos Avenue
