= Los Jardines metro station (Lima) =

Lima metro station

Los Jardines
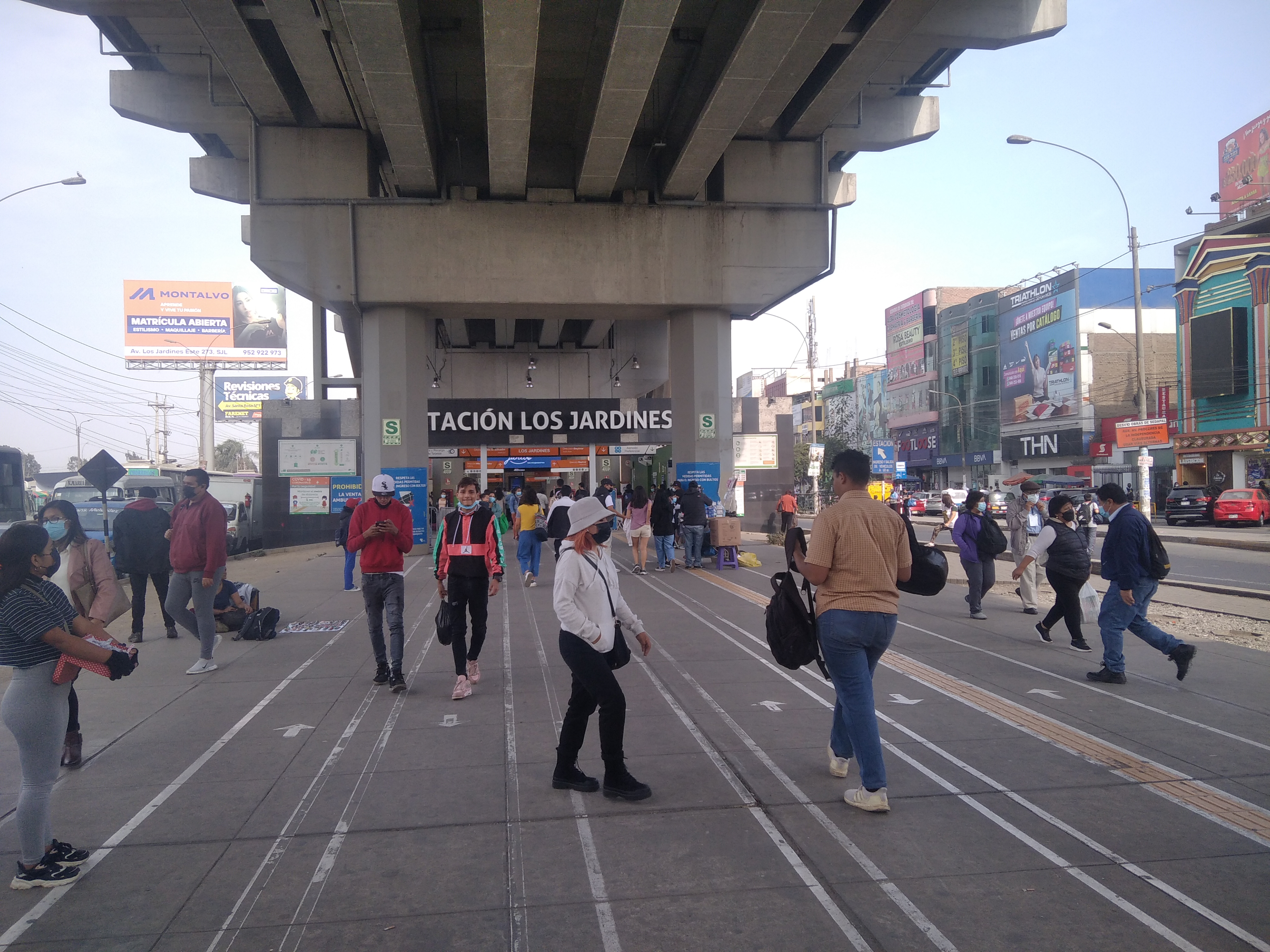

General information
- Location: Av. Los Jardines Oeste; Cercado de Lima, Lima; Peru
- Coordinates: 12°00′25.1″S 77°00′18.9″W
- System: Lima and Callao Metro station
- Line: Line 1

History
- Opened: 3 January 2012

Services
Preceding station	Lima and Callao Metro	Following station
Pirámide del Sol toward Villa El Salvador	Line 1	Los Postes toward Bayóvar
Location

Los Jardines is a Lima and Callao Metro station on Line 1. The station is located between Pirámide del Sol and Los Postes. It was opened on 3 January 2012 as part of the extension of the line from Miguel Grau to Bayóvar.
