= Caja de Agua metro station =

Lima metro station

Caja de Agua

General information
- Location: Av. Próceres de la Independencia; San Juan de Lurigancho, Lima; Peru
- Coordinates: 12°01′39.2″S 77°00′40″W
- System: Lima and Callao Metro station
- Line: Line 1

History
- Opened: 3 January 2012

Services
| Preceding station | Lima and Callao Metro | Following station |
|---|---|---|
| Presbítero Maestro toward Villa El Salvador | Line 1 | Pirámide del Sol toward Bayóvar |
Location

Caja de Agua is a Lima and Callao Metro station on Line 1. The station is located between Presbítero Maestro and Pirámide del Sol. It was opened on 3 January 2012 as part of the extension of the line from Miguel Grau to Bayóvar.
