= San Carlos metro station (Lima) =

Lima metro station

San Carlos
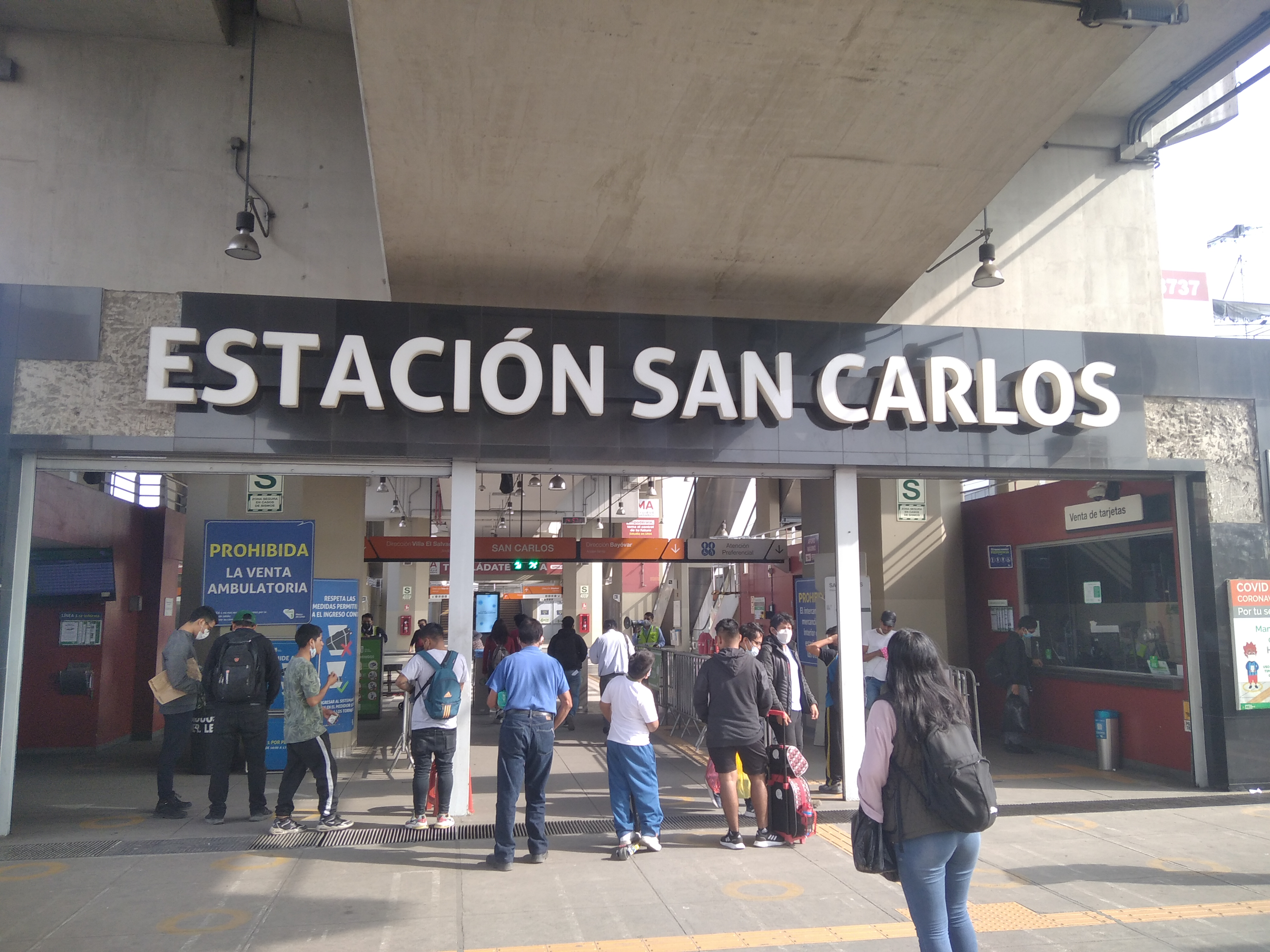

General information
- Location: Av. El Sol; Cercado de Lima, Lima; Peru
- Coordinates: 11°59′05.6″S 77°00′24.2″W
- System: Lima and Callao Metro station
- Line: Line 1

History
- Opened: 3 January 2012

Services
Preceding station	Lima and Callao Metro	Following station
Los Postes toward Villa El Salvador	Line 1	San Martín toward Bayóvar
Location

San Carlos is a Lima and Callao Metro station on Line 1. The station is located between Los Postes and San Martín. It was opened on 3 January 2012 as part of the extension of the line from Miguel Grau to Bayóvar.
