= Los Postes metro station =

Lima metro station

Los Postes
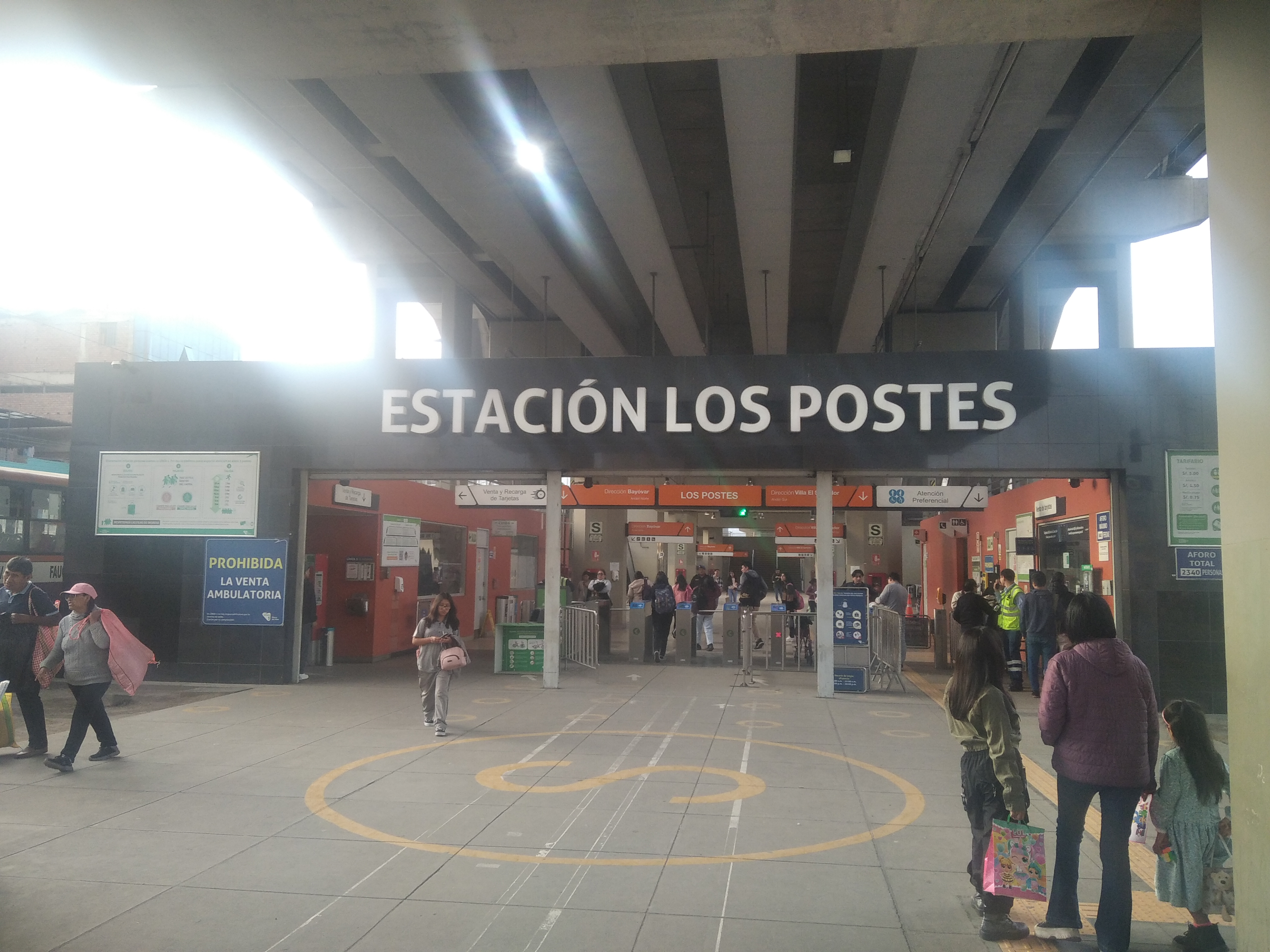

General information
- Location: Av. Próceres de la Independencia; Cercado de Lima, Lima; Peru
- Coordinates: 11°59′46.6″S 77°00′35.6″W
- System: Lima and Callao Metro station
- Line: Line 1

History
- Opened: 3 January 2012

Services
Preceding station	Lima and Callao Metro	Following station
Los Jardines toward Villa El Salvador	Line 1	San Carlos toward Bayóvar
Location

Los Postes is a Lima and Callao Metro station on Line 1. The station is located between Los Jardines and San Carlos. It was opened on 3 January 2012 as part of the extension of the line from Miguel Grau to Bayóvar.
