= Presbítero Maestro metro station =

Lima metro station

Presbítero Maestro
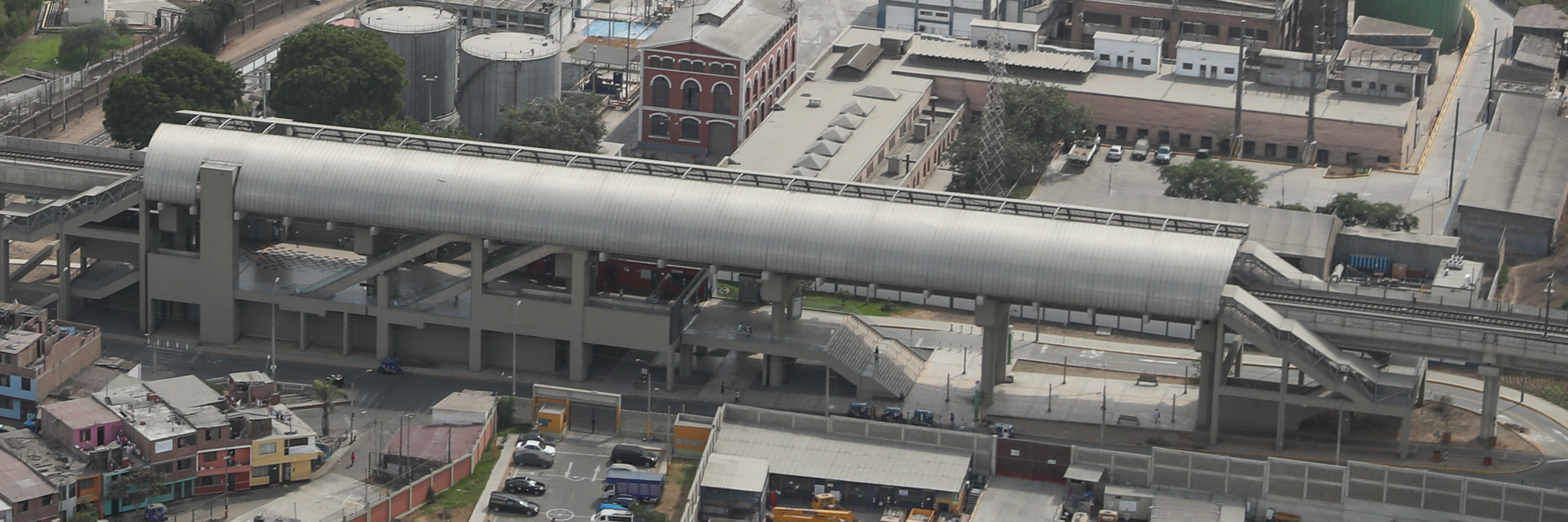

General information
- Location: Lima; Peru
- Coordinates: 12°02′30.2″S 77°00′41.9″W
- System: Lima and Callao Metro station
- Line: Line 1

History
- Opened: 3 January 2012

Services
Preceding station	Lima and Callao Metro	Following station
El Ángel toward Villa El Salvador	Line 1	Caja de Agua toward Bayóvar
Location

Presbítero Maestro is a Lima and Callao Metro station on Line 1. The station is located between El Ángel and Caja de Agua. It was opened on 3 January 2012 as part of the extension of the line from Miguel Grau to Bayóvar.
