= San Martín metro station =

Lima metro station

San Martín
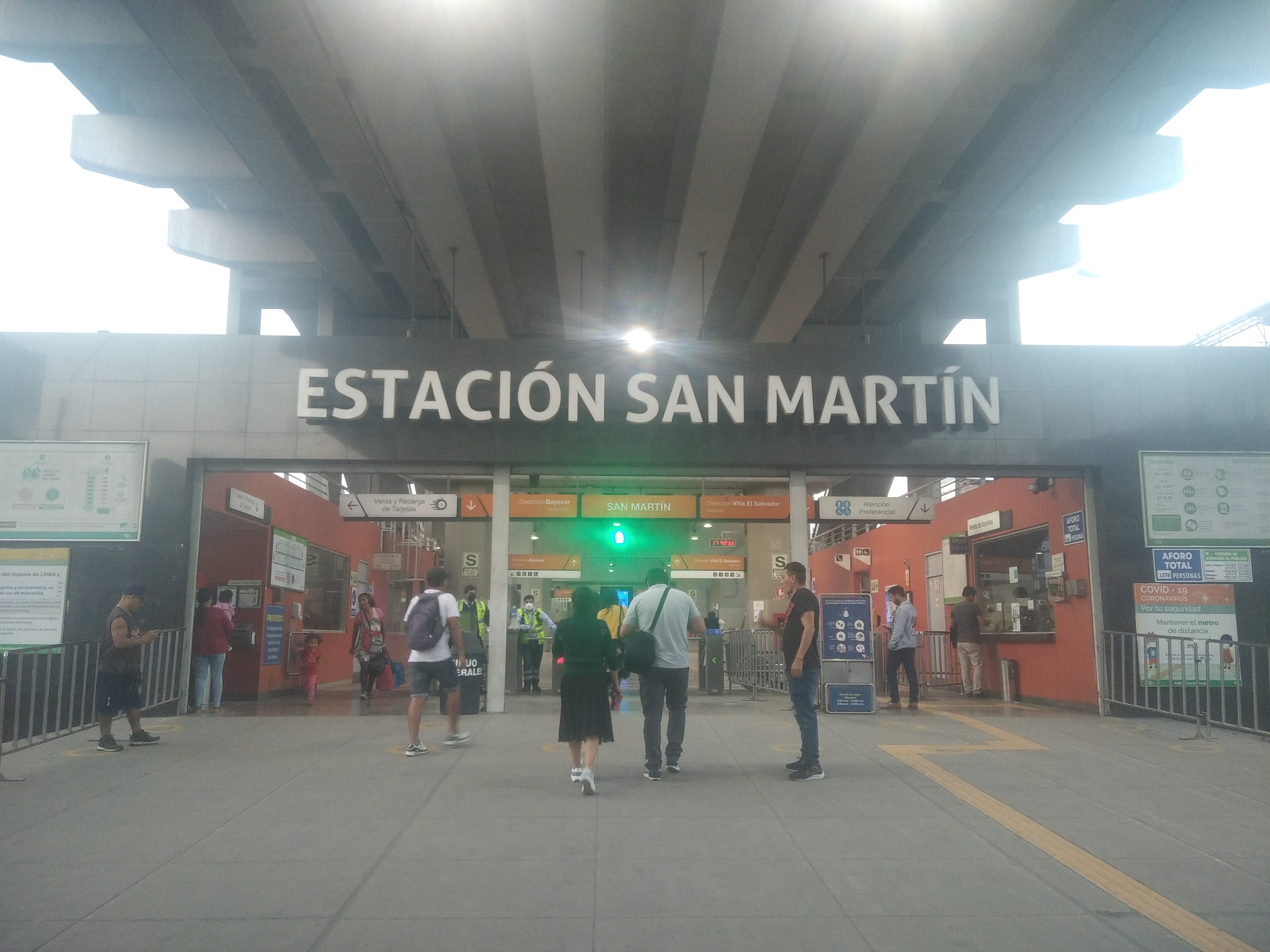

General information
- Location: Av. Fernando Wiesse; San Juan de Lurigancho, Lima; Peru
- Coordinates: 11°58′28.7″S 77°00′00″W
- System: Lima and Callao Metro station
- Line: Line 1

History
- Opened: 3 January 2012

Services
Preceding station	Lima and Callao Metro	Following station
San Carlos toward Villa El Salvador	Line 1	Santa Rosa toward Bayóvar
Location

San Martín is a Lima and Callao Metro station on Line 1. The station is located between San Carlos and Santa Rosa. It was opened on 3 January 2012 as part of the extension of the line from Miguel Grau to Bayóvar.
