= Pirámide del Sol metro station =

Lima metro station

Pirámide del Sol

General information
- Location: Av. Próceres de la Independencia; San Juan de Lurigancho, Lima; Peru
- Coordinates: 12°01′05.4″S 77°00′10″W
- System: Lima and Callao Metro station
- Line: Line 1

History
- Opened: 3 January 2012

Services
Preceding station	Lima and Callao Metro	Following station
Caja de Agua toward Villa El Salvador	Line 1	Los Jardines toward Bayóvar
Location

Pirámide del Sol is a Lima and Callao Metro station on Line 1. The station is located between Caja de Agua and Los Jardines. It was opened on 3 January 2012 as part of the extension of the line from Miguel Grau to Bayóvar. The name comes from a nearby street in Zárate section which is named after an alternate name for the Huaca del Sol near Trujillo.
