= La Cultura metro station =

Lima metro station

La Cultura
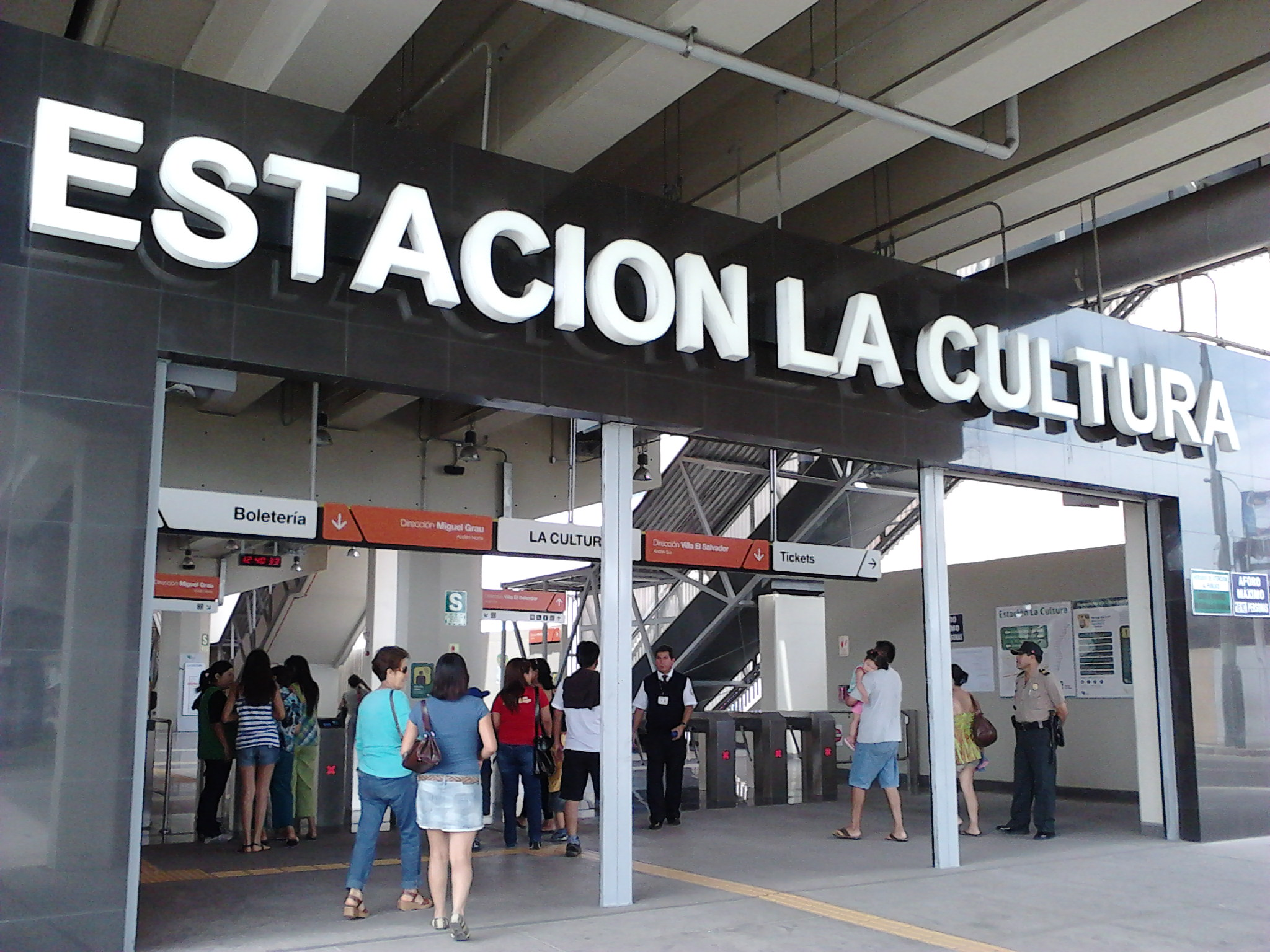
- La Cultura station in 2012

General information
- Location: Lima; Peru
- Coordinates: 12°05′12.3″S 77°00′13.4″W
- System: Lima and Callao Metro station
- Line: Line 1

History
- Opened: 11 July 2011

Services
Preceding station	Lima and Callao Metro	Following station
San Borja Sur toward Villa El Salvador	Line 1	Arriola toward Bayóvar
Location

La Cultura is a Lima and Callao Metro station on Line 1. The station is located between San Borja Sur and Arriola. It was opened on 11 July 2011 as part of the extension of the line from Atocongo to Miguel Grau. The full revenue service started on 3 January 2012.
