= Cabitos metro station =

Lima metro station

Cabitos
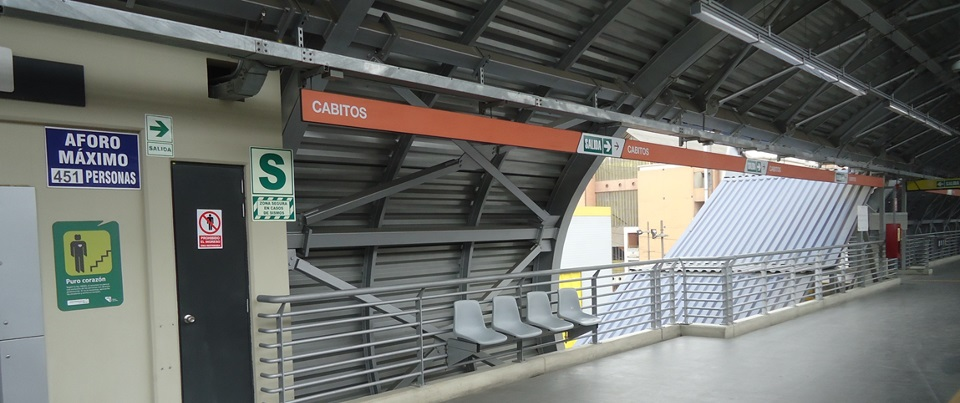
- Cabitos station in 2013

General information
- Location: Lima; Peru
- Coordinates: 12°07′38.4″S 77°00′01.6″W
- System: Lima and Callao Metro station
- Line: Line 1

History
- Opened: 11 July 2011

Services
Preceding station	Lima and Callao Metro	Following station
Ayacucho toward Villa El Salvador	Line 1	Angamos toward Bayóvar
Location

Cabitos is a Lima and Callao Metro station on Line 1. The station is located between Ayacucho and Angamos. It was opened on 11 July 2011 as part of the extension of the line from Atocongo to Miguel Grau. The full revenue service started on 3 January 2012.
