= Jorge Chávez metro station =

Lima metro station

Jorge Chávez
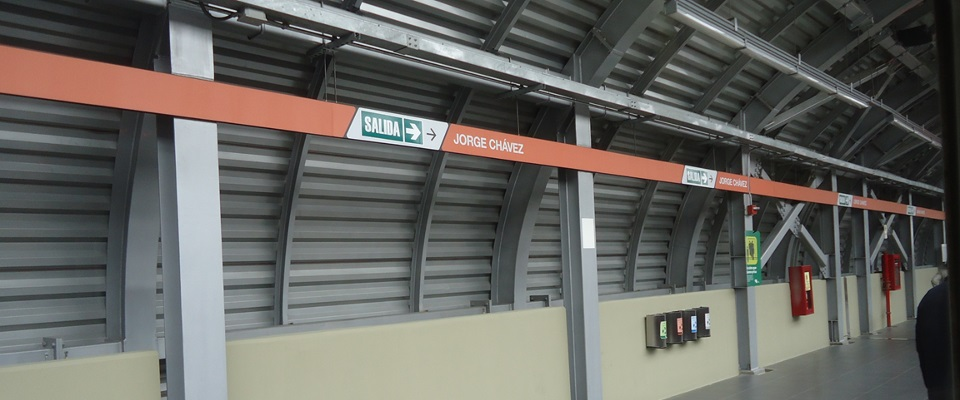
- Jorge Chávez station in 2013

General information
- Location: Lima; Peru
- Coordinates: 12°08′33.4″S 76°59′27.7″W
- System: Lima and Callao Metro station
- Line: Line 1

History
- Opened: 11 July 2011

Services
Preceding station	Lima and Callao Metro	Following station
Atocongo toward Villa El Salvador	Line 1	Ayacucho toward Bayóvar
Location

Jorge Chávez is a Lima and Callao Metro station on Line 1. The station is located between Atocongo and Ayacucho. It was opened on 11 July 2011 as part of the extension of the line from Atocongo to Miguel Grau. The full revenue service started on 3 January 2012.
