= San Borja Sur metro station =

Lima metro station

San Borja Sur
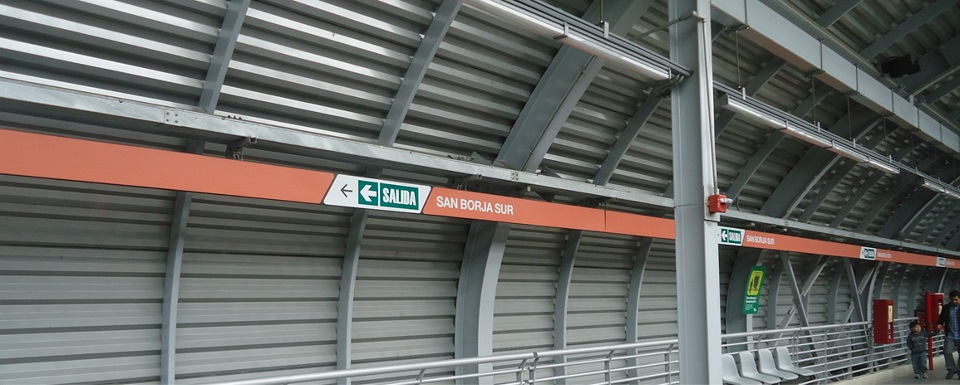
- San Borja Sur station in 2013

General information
- Location: Lima; Peru
- Coordinates: 12°06′01.8″S 77°00′06.3″W
- System: Lima and Callao Metro station
- Line: Line 1

History
- Opened: 11 July 2011

Services
Preceding station	Lima and Callao Metro	Following station
Angamos toward Villa El Salvador	Line 1	La Cultura toward Bayóvar
Location

San Borja Sur is a Lima and Callao Metro station on Line 1. The station is located between Angamos and La Cultura. It was opened on 11 July 2011 as part of the extension of the line from Atocongo to Miguel Grau. The full revenue service started on 3 January 2012.
