= Parque Industrial metro station =

Lima metro station

Parque Industrial
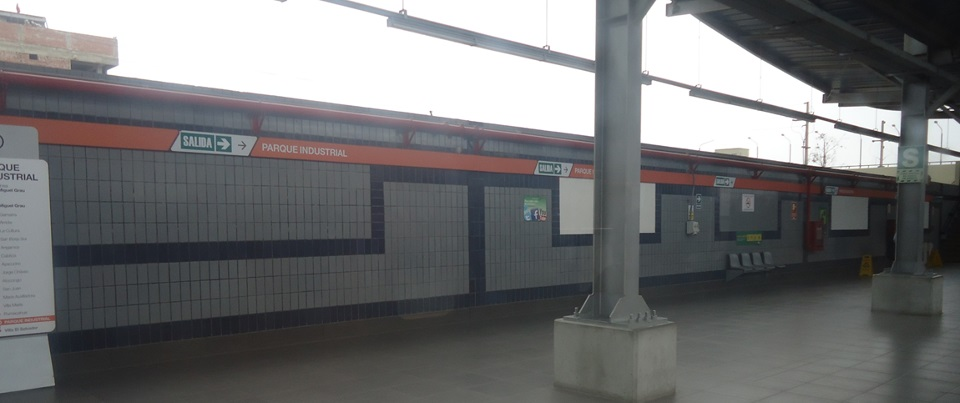
- Parque Industrial station in 2013

General information
- Location: Lima; Peru
- Coordinates: 12°11′46.6″S 76°56′23.9″W
- System: Lima and Callao Metro station
- Line: Line 1

History
- Opened: 28 April 1990

Services
| Preceding station | Lima and Callao Metro | Following station |
|---|---|---|
| Villa El Salvador Terminus | Line 1 | Pumacahua toward Bayóvar |
Location

Parque Industrial is a Lima and Callao Metro station on Line 1. The station is located between Villa El Salvador and Pumacahua. It was inaugurated on 28 April 1990 as part of the first section of the line between Villa El Salvador and Atocongo. However, commercial service only started on 18 January 2003, was suspended in July 2003 due to the lack of funds and resumed only on Saturdays and Sundays on 17 January 2004. The full revenue service started on 3 January 2012, with trains running to Miguel Grau.
