= Gamarra metro station =

Metro station in Lima, Peru

Gamarra
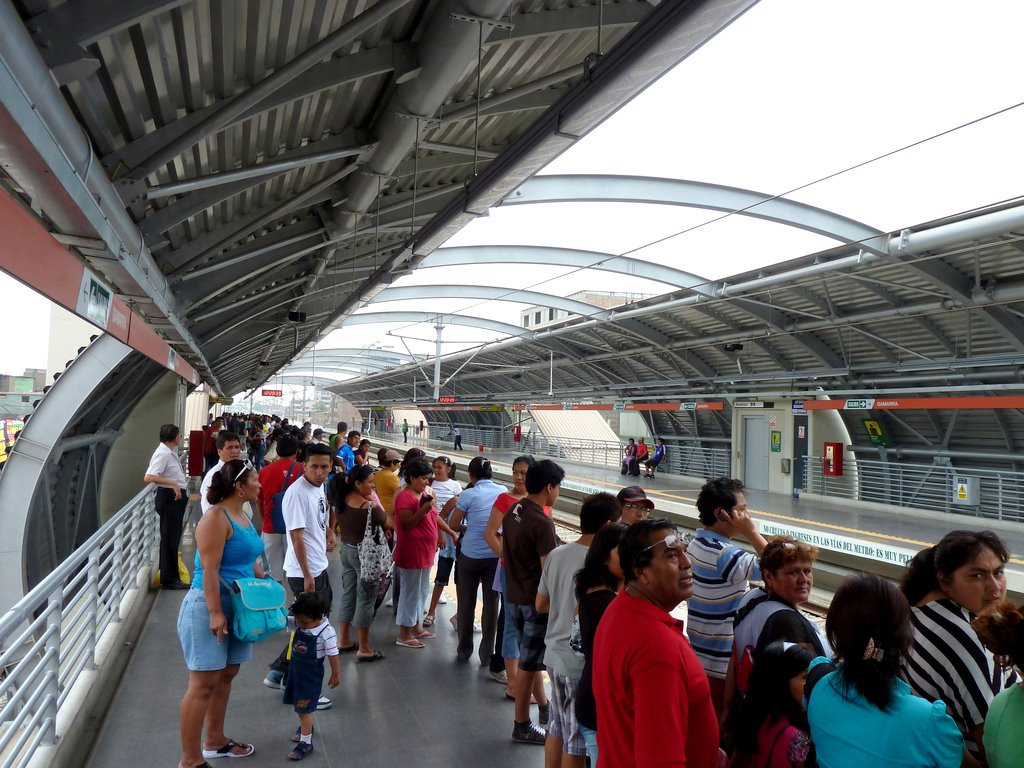
- Gamarra station in 2012

General information
- Location: Lima; Peru
- Coordinates: 12°03′56.5″S 77°00′44.3″W
- System: Lima and Callao Metro station
- Line: Line 1

History
- Opened: 11 July 2011

Services
Preceding station	Lima and Callao Metro	Following station
Arriola toward Villa El Salvador	Line 1	Miguel Grau toward Bayóvar
Location

Gamarra is a Lima and Callao Metro station on Line 1. The station is located between Arriola and Miguel Grau. It was opened on 11 July 2011 as part of the extension of the line from Atocongo to Miguel Grau. The full revenue service started on 3 January 2012.
