= El Ángel metro station =

Lima metro station

El Ángel
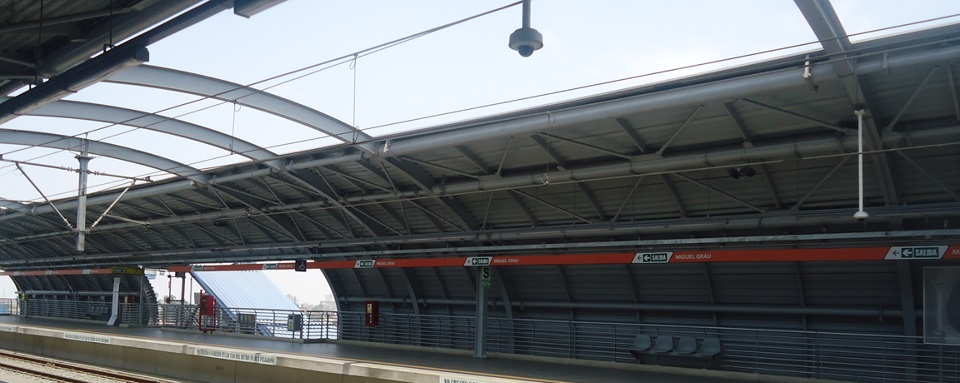
- El Ángel metro station

General information
- Location: Lima; Peru
- Coordinates: 12°02′45.8″S 77°00′35″W
- System: Lima and Callao Metro station
- Line: Line 1

History
- Opened: 3 January 2012

Services
Preceding station	Lima and Callao Metro	Following station
Miguel Grau toward Villa El Salvador	Line 1	Presbítero Maestro toward Bayóvar
Location

El Ángel is a Lima and Callao Metro station on Line 1. The station is located between Miguel Grau and Presbítero Maestro. It was opened on 3 January 2012 as part of the extension of the line from Miguel Grau to Bayóvar.
