= Santa Rosa metro station (Lima) =

Lima metro station

Santa Rosa
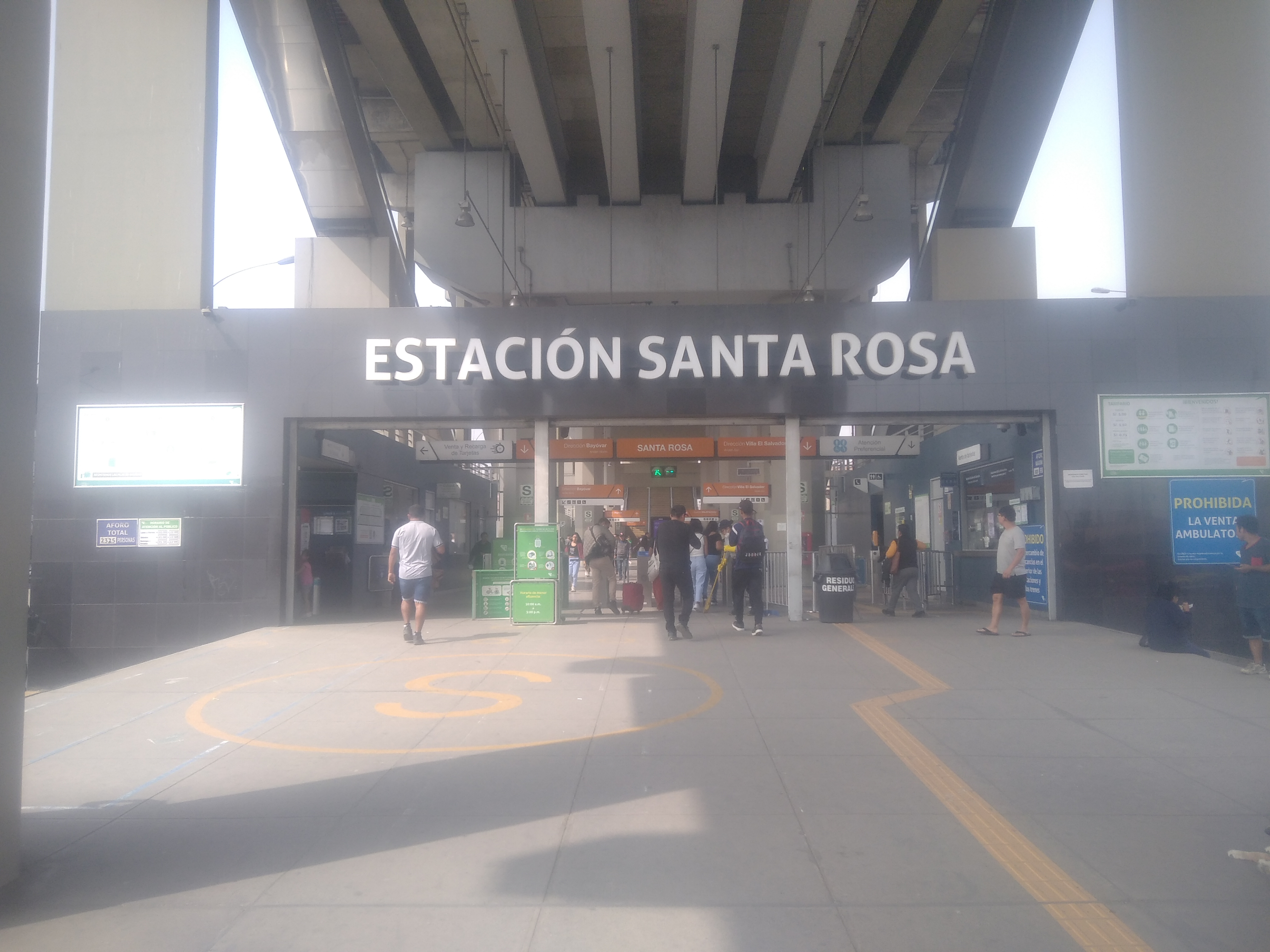

General information
- Location: Av. Fernando Wiesse; San Juan de Lurigancho, Lima; Peru
- Coordinates: 11°58′05.6″S 76°59′36.3″W
- System: Lima and Callao Metro station
- Line: Line 1

History
- Opened: 3 January 2012

Services
Preceding station	Lima and Callao Metro	Following station
San Martín toward Villa El Salvador	Line 1	Bayóvar Terminus
Location

Santa Rosa is a Lima and Callao Metro station on Line 1. The station is located between San Martín and Bayóvar. It was opened on 3 January 2012 as part of the extension of the line from Miguel Grau to Bayóvar.
