= Transport in Lima =

Public transport in Lima consists of buses, minibuses (known as micros), taxis, and mototaxis (tuk-tuk). Micros are the most common means of public transportation in Lima and many other cities in Peru. There are also more than 100 kilometres (62 mi) of cycle paths in the city.

The word micro is commonly used in Peruvian Spanish as an abbreviation for microbús (minibus). While bigger vehicles are known as micros, smaller vehicles are known as either combis or micros. These are privately owned vehicles that are considered to be both economical and convenient, but also risky.

Micros drive from one street corner to another along all the major arterial city roads. Stickers saying, for example, "Todo Angamos" or "Todo Benavides", can be seen on their windscreens, which indicates that the micro runs the whole length of Avenida Angamos or Avenida Alfredo Benavides. These microbuses travel dangerously fast, frequently crashing and speeding off before their passengers have safely entered the vehicle. As there are few bus stops, passengers are picked up and dropped off anywhere along their route by the micros and combis, despite this being prohibited. Tickets became compulsory in the late 1980s. As no transfer tickets are issued, double fares are often used by people when a micro does not travel to their desired destination, although as the routes are not controlled, many micros will travel to most destinations within the city limits. The only places where micros are no longer allowed to circulate is in the crosstown streets within downtown Lima, which means anyone travelling from the west to east must walk or take a taxi, with micros travelling north to south only through either the west or east sides' main arteries, Tacna Avenue and Abancay Avenue, respectively.

The new Metropolitano bus rapid transit system and the first line of the Lima Metro have attempted to modernise transport in Lima.

== Lima Metro ==
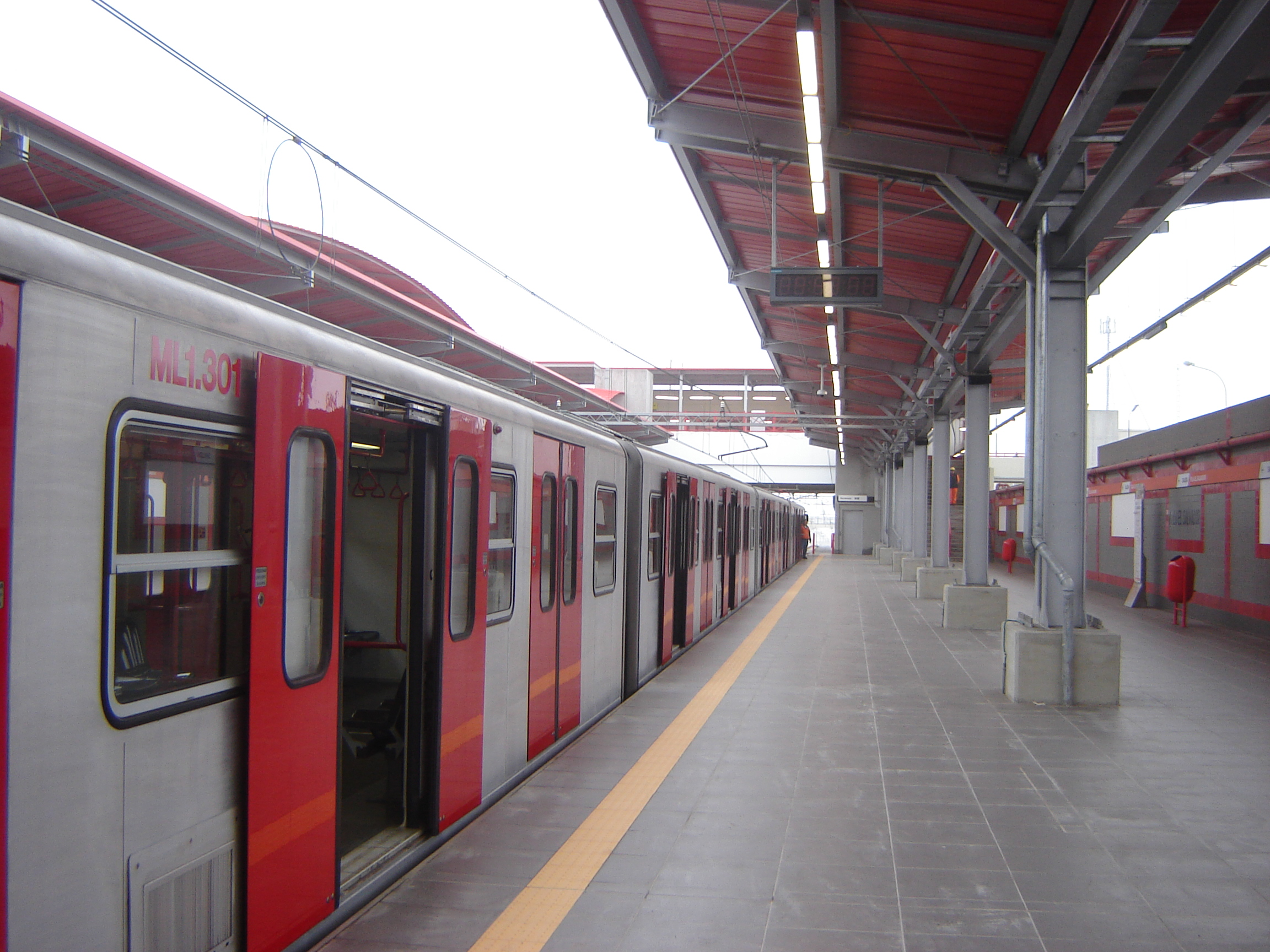
AnsaldoBreda Train in Villa el Salvador station

The Lima Metro is the electric mass transit system of the Lima Metropolitan Area in Peru. It currently consists of one line of 35 kilometres (22 mi) and 26 stations, joining the southern area of the metropolis with the centre and the north east of the city. Five additional lines are planned.

In 2010, the government of Alan García resumed construction of the Lima Metro starting with Line 1. This saw the construction and implementation of 11.7 kilometres (7.3 mi), combined with a total of 22.5 kilometres (14.0 mi) of viaduct, from the Atocongo Bridge to downtown Lima. The Lima Metro Line 1 was built by a consortium made up by two engineering and construction companies and began commercial operations in early 2012. There have been 19 new Alstom trains since November 2012, adding to the current fleet of five AnsaldoBreda trains, which is major impulse of the service. Since July 2014, the line was extended by 12.4 kilometres (7.7 mi) to run to the northern district of San Juan de Lurigancho.

Line 2 is an east to west underground metro line currently under construction with plans to link this line to the Jorge Chavez International Airport, which will begin the first stage of the future Line 4. Line 2 was initially expected to begin partial operation in 2016, and full operation for both lines in 2019. However, due to various delays, Line 2 only became operational on 21 December 2023 as part of a three-month trial run and is predicted to be fully operational through all 27 stations by 2028.

== El Metropolitano ==
The Metropolitano is a bus rapid transit (BRT) system that integrates the main bus corridor, known by the Spanish acronym COSAC 1 (Corredor Segregado de Alta Capacidad, which means "segregated high capacity bus corridor" in English). This system links the principal points of the Lima Metropolitan Area with 33 kilometres (21 mi) of long line from Independencia in the north of the city to Chorrillos in the south of the city. It has 38 stations along 33 kilometres (21 mi) of busway. This system is similar to the TransMilenio of Bogotá, and inspired by the National Urban Transport Company (in Spanish: Empresa Nacional de Transporte Urbano, ENATRU) which was the first urban transport system in Peru that also inspired other companies, such as the Rede Integrada de Transporte, which started the era of BRT.

== Sistema Integrado de Transporte ==
The Sistema Integrado de Transporte (SIT) ("Integrated Transport System" in English) is a bus system developed by the local government to reorganise the current route system. SIT aims to reduce the number of urban routes, renew the bus fleet currently operating by many private companies and to reduce (and eventually replace) most combis from the city.

As of July 2020, SIT currently operates 16 routes: SAN MARTIN DE PORRES – SURCO (107) ATE – SAN MIGUEL (201, 202, 204, 206 and 209), RIMAC – SURCO (301, 302, 303 and 306), San Juan de Lurigancho – MAGDALENA (404, 405, 409, 412), and DOWNTOWN LIMA – SAN MIGUEL (508)

== Buses ==
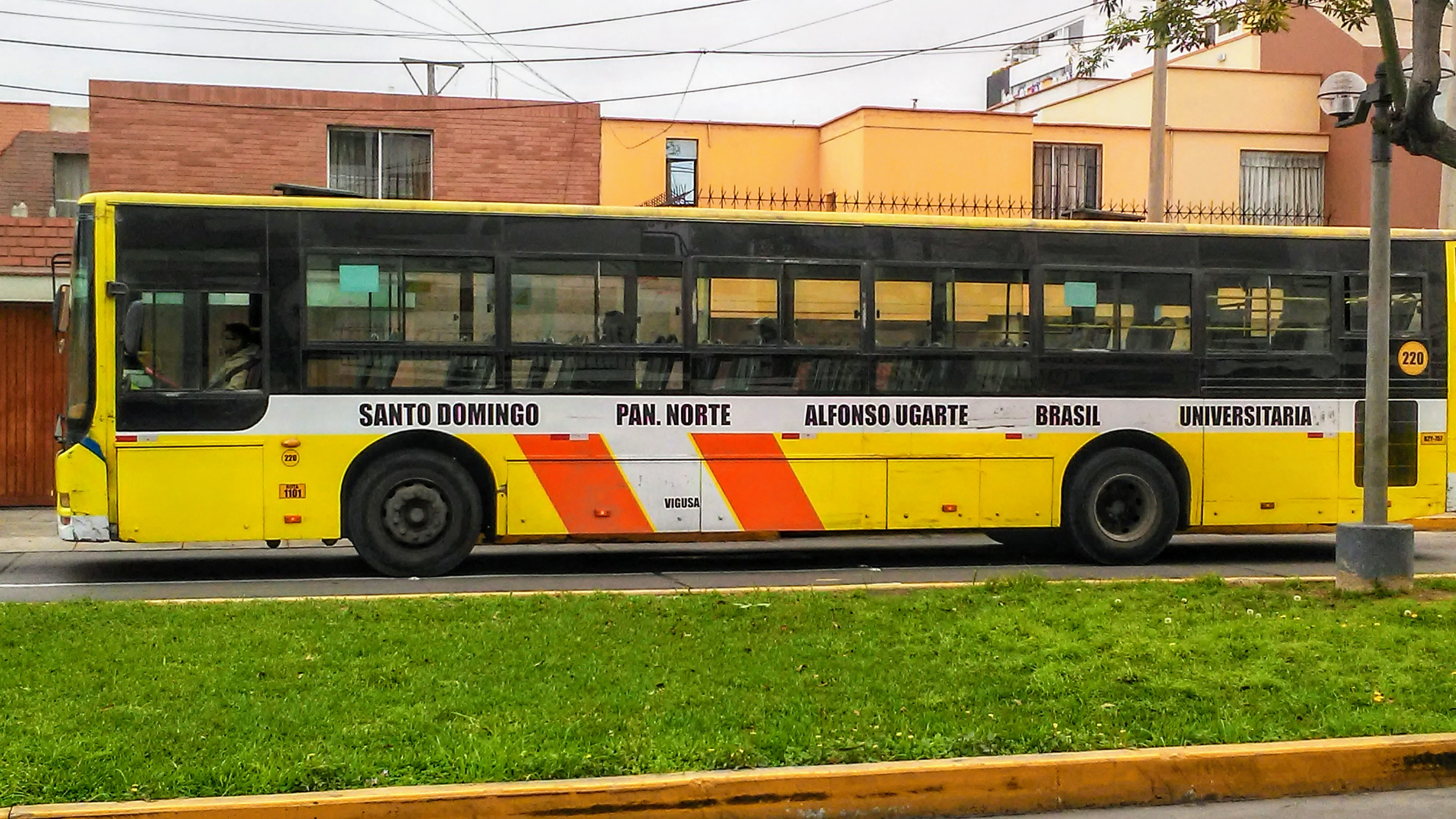
Bus in Lima

In the 1990s, during the government of president Alberto Fujimori, there was an insufficient number of buses to transport people around the city, so the use of secondhand vehicles (mostly combis) from others countries was permitted.

Since the end of the 2000s, many combis were replaced by buses between 9 metres (30 ft) and 18 metres (59 ft) in length.

=== Vehicles ===
The most popular vehicle types used by the buses in Lima are Volvo, the Brazilian CAIO, Marcopolo, Comil, and also bus brands like MODASA, METALBUS, Yutong, KING LONG, and GOLDEN DRAGON.

=== Routes ===
Each transport company has its own routes, which usually pass through many districts. Some of the routes in the Lima and Callao Metropolitan Area are:

- Ate – Callao (Routes 4901, 4902, 4904, 4905, 4908, 4911, 9401, 9404 and 9405)
- Carabayllo – Miraflores (Routes 1702, 1705 and 1706)
- Carabayllo – Pachacámac (Routes 1803, 8102, 8104, 8105, 8106, 8107 and 8108)
- Villa el Salvador – Ventanilla (Routes 9801 and 9802)
- San Martin de Porres – Pachacámac (Routes 2803, 2804, 2805, 8201, 8203, 8205, 8209, 8211, 8212, 8213 and 8214)
- San Bartolo – San Miguel (Routes 8510 and 8511)
- Santiago de Surco – Ancón (Routes 1702 and 1804)
- Villa el Salvador – San Juan de Lurigancho (Routes 8306 and 3807)

Some older routes were defined by their old numbering until the early 1990s. The old route number is usually prominently displayed on the passenger side of the front window, as a backward reference. Many modern routes, however, do not have this number. As of 2007, old route numbers that are still well known are numbers 2 (route 9504), 8 (route 3810), 9 (route 8403), 23 (routes 8519, 8520 and 3806), 31 (route 3707), 48 (route 3612), 71 (route 4908), 91 (routes 4405 and 4703) and 94 (route 3906).

If one company has many routes and generally overlaps with other routes, these different routes may be differentiated by letters: 104A, 104B, 104C, and so on. For instance: 104A (this route is not available) goes from Penal section of San Juan de Lurigancho to San Miguel via downtown on the east side; 104B (route 3509) goes from Mangomarca section of SJL (the original terminus) to San Miguel via the east side; and 104C (this route is not available) goes from Mangomarca to Miraflores, via the west side.

== Taxis ==
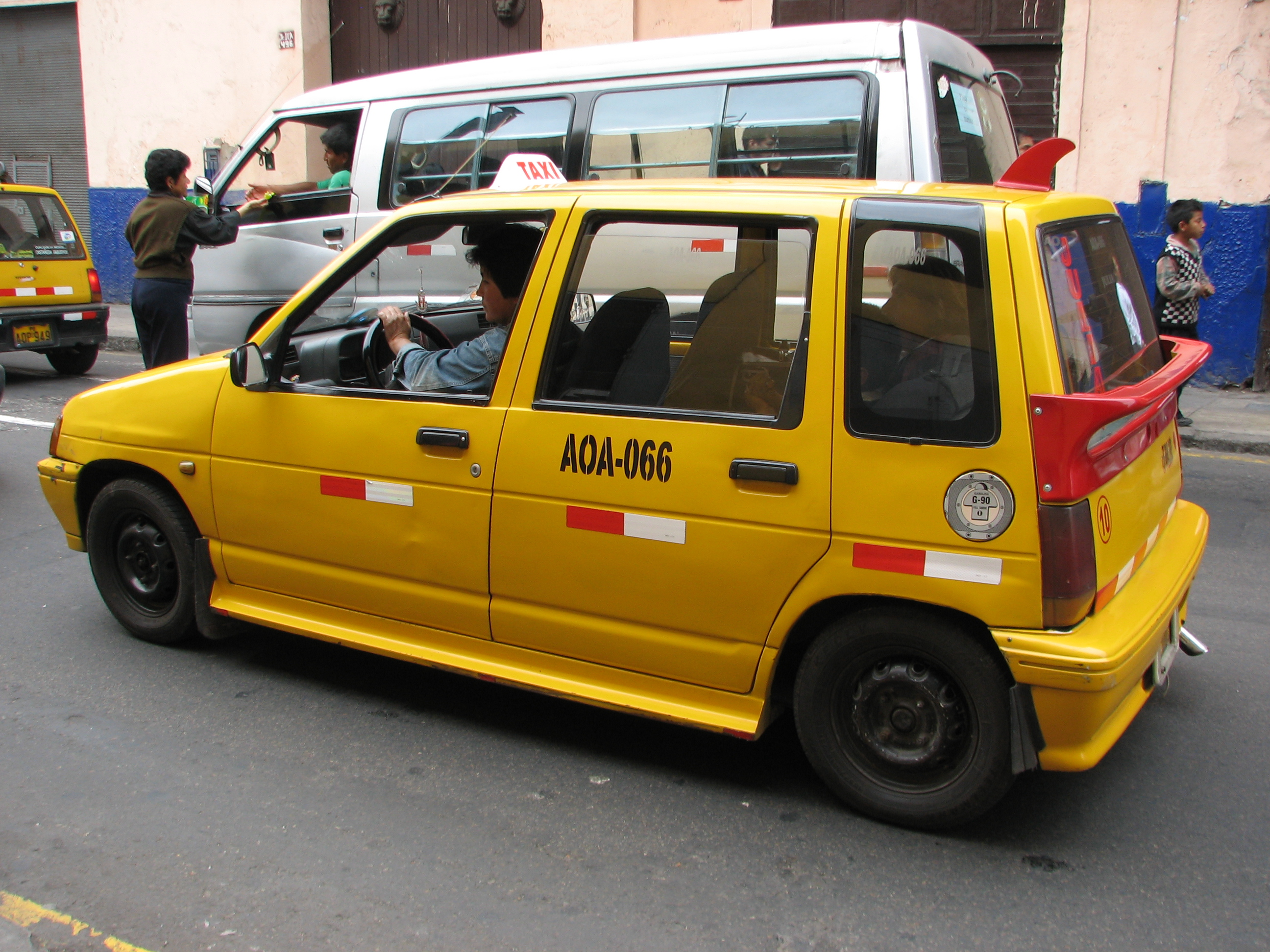
Daewoo Tico taxi in downtown Lima

Taxis in the city are considered to be an economical mode of transport. As there are no meters, a price must be agreed with the driver prior to commencing the journey. However, many taxi drivers may overcharge inexperienced foreigners with high cab fares.

They vary in sizes from small four door compacts (generally Korean Daewoo Ticos) to large vans. They are ubiquitous, accounting for a large part of the car stock. Often they can be any car with a taxi sticker on the windscreen. As in other major cities the way to flag them down is to wave your hand up high. There are many different taxi companies in Lima, one of which is Taxi Seguro, which can be contacted directly and collect passengers in company cars. The most common cars used as taxis in Lima are Kia Rio, Chevrolet Sail, Toyota Yaris and some Toyota and Nissan station wagon models.

In recent years, vehicle for hire mobile apps have become more popular, since they usually provide a more comfortable experience than regular taxis, which are often considered not as safe. Some of the most used taxi apps in Lima are Beat and Uber, and to a lesser extent Cabify and DiDi.

The taxis will travel to a multitude of different locations. Citizens of Lima commonly joke that they have the most educated taxi drivers in the world. The joke is based on the fact that taxi-running is a major source of income for unemployed or under-employed people, including professionals with a university degrees who either rent or own the cars they drive. A whole economy spreads from investments in vehicle acquisition to be later rented as taxi cabs.

Taxis are the most efficient and fastest way of transportation in Lima, although they are also considered somewhat risky during rush-hour traffic as criminals have been known to disguise themselves as taxi drivers to later steal from passengers at gunpoint. An indication of the security of the Taxi is to check if it has the label of the Setame on the windshield, which stands for Servicio de Taxi Metropolitano, the administrative authority that regulates taxi cabs. Setame taxis are in most cases painted in a distinctive yellow colour. Taxis without the Setame label are considered to be informal and risky. However, in recent times, the Setame label is no longer synonymous with safety, with people choosing modern IOS/ Android taxi services to solicit a safe option of transport.

Mototaxis and pedicabs are used in peripheral districts such as Puente Piedra and Lurín where there is no heavy traffic, although with the spread of urbanization and routes, they are losing ground to regular micros.

== Public transport statistics ==
The average amount of time people spend commuting on public transport in Lima during the week is 95 minutes, with 35% of commuters travelling for more than 2 hours every day. The average amount of time people wait at a bus stop or station is 14 minutes, while 19% of commuters wait for over 20 minutes on average every day. The average distance people usually travel in a single journey on public transport is 8.1 kilometres (5.0 mi), while 17% travel for over 12 kilometres (7.5 mi) in a single direction.

== Private cars ==
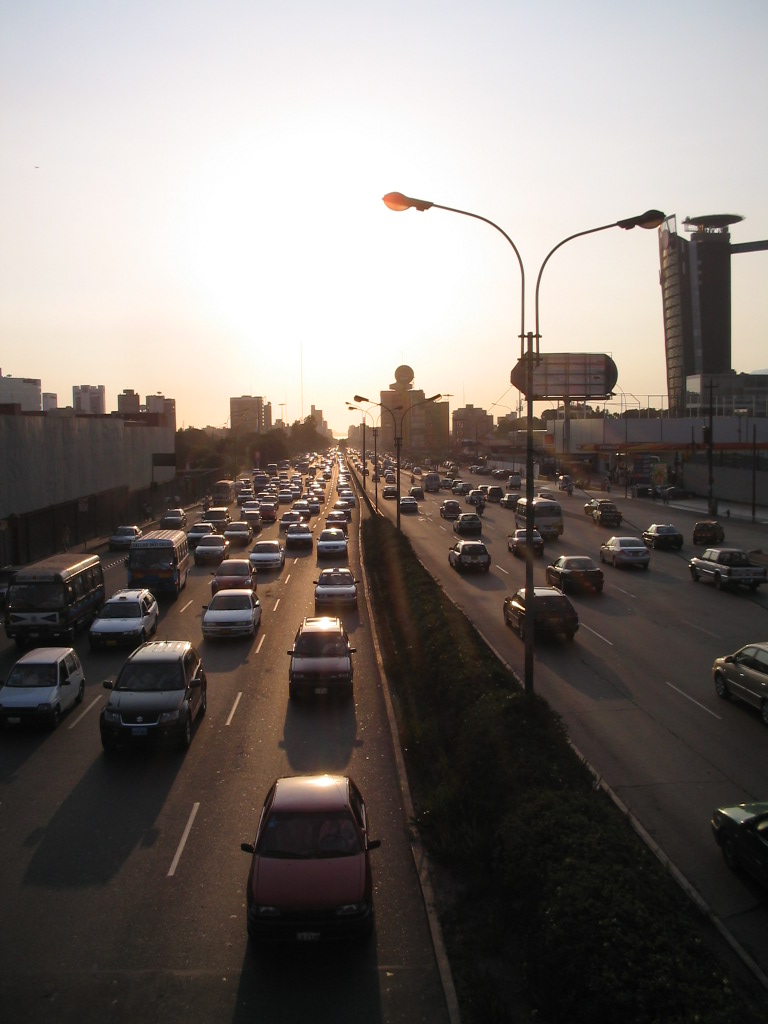
Normal transit on the Javier Prado avenue.

In the last two decades, car sales have been growing annually. Now Lima has approximately 1.4 million cars, with industry plans to sell around of 200,000 new vehicles in the coming years. This method of commuting is one of the most common, which is a result of a growing economy and a better rate of income among the citizens of Lima.

== Air transport ==
Lima is served by the Jorge Chavez International Airport, located in Callao. It is the largest airport of the country with the largest amount of domestic and international air traffic. It also serves as a major hub in the Latin American air network.

Lima also has other airports in San Bartolo and the Las Palmas Air Force Base.

== Pollution ==
Few richer transportation companies use modern bodies made in Brazil or Argentina. Smaller companies use smaller vehicles such as minibuses and minivans.

Since almost all of these vehicles are poorly maintained, they produce a great amount of pollution. Statistics show that in July 2001, the amount of nitrogen dioxide (NO_{2}) was of 236.66 mg/m^{3}, the maximum allowable quantity being 100 mg/m^{3}. The presence of small particles of different materials (dust, lead and other metals), was also high during this month: 294.12 mg/m^{3}, while the allowed limit is 150 mg/m^{3}.

== See also ==
- Lima Metro
- El Metropolitano
- List of metro systems
- List of bus rapid transit systems
