= Alfredo Benavides Avenue =

Avenue in Lima, Peru

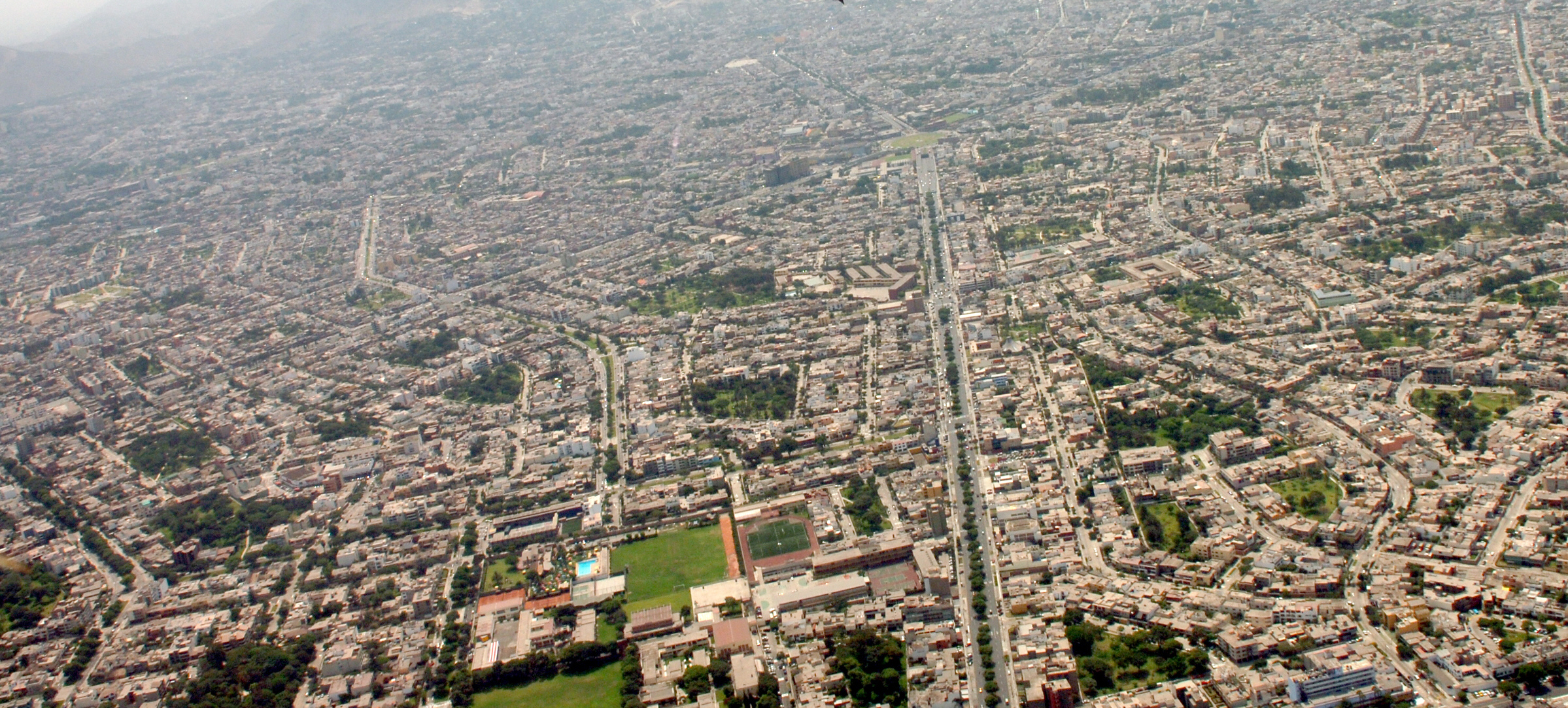
- Interactive map of Alfredo Benavides Avenue
- Namesake: Alfredo Benavides
- From: Bajada Balta
- Major junctions: Paseo de la República, República de Panamá, Velasco Astete, Caminos del Inca avenues
- To: Pan-American Highway

Alfredo Benavides Avenue (Spanish: Avenida Alfredo Benavides) is one of the busiest avenues in the city of Lima, Peru. It runs for 55 blocks through the districts of Miraflores and Santiago de Surco, starting at the Bajada Balta and concluding at the eponymous bridge that crosses over the Pan-American Highway.

== History ==
The avenue is named after Juan Alfredo Benavides Fernández Cornejo (Islay; 1857 — Lima; 1907), founder of the Banco Internacional del Perú and veteran of the War of the Pacific. Originally a resident of the Jirón de la Unión, he traded his property for an estate in Miraflores, then in the outer limits of the city. The avenue runs through a former portion of his land, ceded by him to the district's municipality.

It is among the busiest avenues in the city due to it housing major institutions, such as Ricardo Palma University, several financial institutions and a number of stations of the city's electric train and Metropolitano, as well as the access to the Pan-American Highway. It also houses an 11-storey building that is incomplete since its construction in the 1980s.

== See also ==
- Transport in Lima
