= Blanca Alva Guerrero =

Peruvian historian

Blanca Alva Guerrero is a Peruvian historian. She was the Director General of Defense of Cultural Heritage for Peru.

== Biography ==
Alva Guerrero graduated from Pontifical Catholic University of Peru and the Ricardo Palma University with postgraduate studies in Museology. She has been deaf since childhood.

She was the General Director of Defense of Cultural Heritage at the Ministry of Culture from 2006 to 2017. She works to protect archaeological works and other cultural heritage items for the country, confiscating illegal handicrafts. As part of her work with Peru's Ministry of Culture, she ensured people do not sell land where cultural items are and that people do not move into those areas.

In 2010, she was awarded the Peru Ministry of Labor "Recognition of the Work and Entrepreneurship" Award.
