= Ricardo Palma University =

Private university in Lima, Peru

- Universidad Ricardo Palma
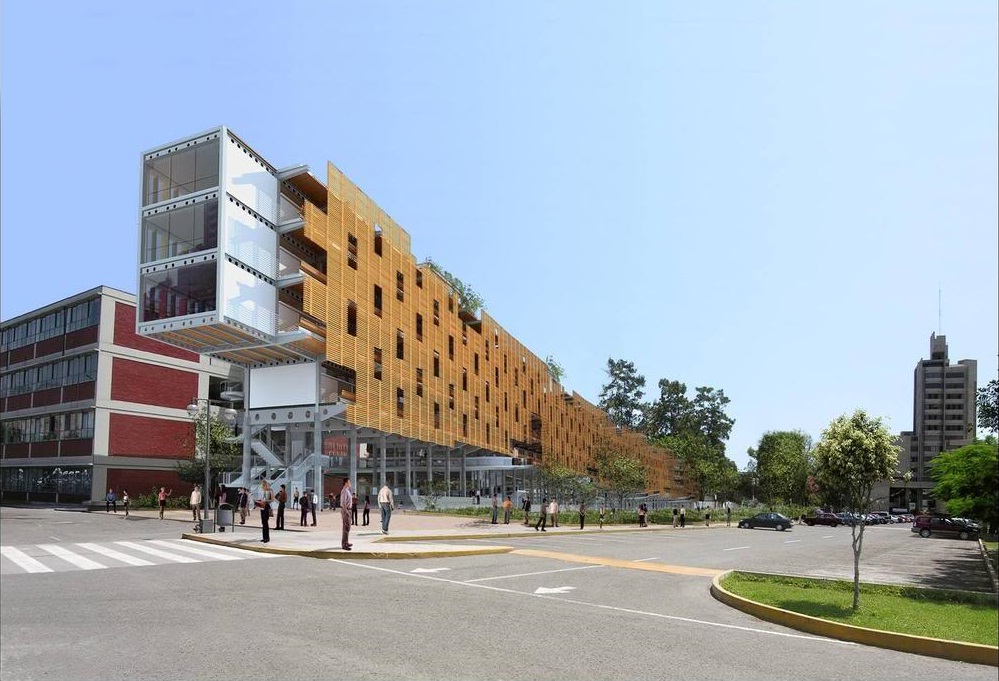
- Main campus in Surco
- Motto: Formamos Seres Humanos para una Cultura de Paz
- Motto in English: We form human beings for a culture of peace
- Type: Private university
- Established: July 1, 1969
- Founder: Antonio San Cristóbal
- Rector: Félix Romero Revilla
- Location: Av. Benavides, cdra. 54, Lima, Peru
- Language: Spanish
- Colours: Green
- Website: www.urp.edu.pe

Ricardo Palma University (Spanish: Universidad Ricardo Palma; URP) is a private university located in Lima, Peru. Located in the district of Santiago de Surco, it was founded on July 1, 1969. It is named after Peruvian writer Ricardo Palma.

== History ==
The process to create the university was started on April 12, 1969, and organised by a group headed by Antonio San Cristóbal. By Decree Law No. 17723, dated July 1, 1969, the university was created as a member entity of the Peruvian University System, with the legal personality of private law emerging from the act of its constitution, which would have as its headquarters the city of Lima, being recognized by paragraph 30 of article 97 of law no. 23733, formerly the "university law."

In 2016, the institutional license was granted to the university, by virtue of the powers granted by Law No. 30220 (the "New University Law"), to offer the university higher educational service with the RCD N.º 040-2016-SUNEDU/CD, to provide this service at its headquarters located at Avenida Alfredo Benavides No. 5440, with a validity of 6 years as determined by the Board of Directors of the National Superintendency of University Higher Education (SUNEDU).

The university's rector, Iván Rodríguez Chávez, died on December 30, 2023.

== See also ==
- Friendship Park (Lima), located next to the university.
