= Miguel Grau metro station =

Lima metro station

Miguel Grau
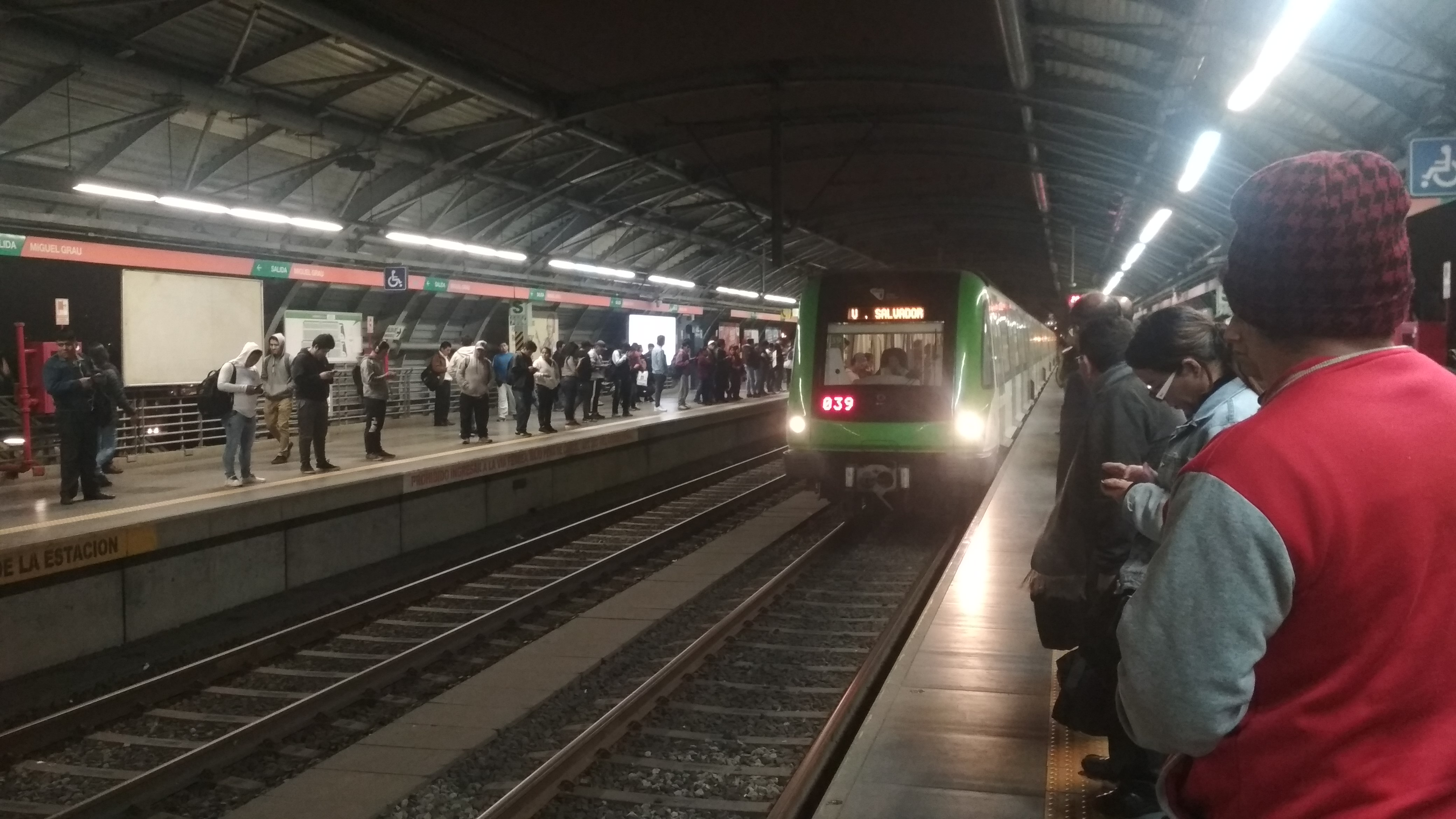
- Miguel Grau station in 2019

General information
- Location: Lima; Peru
- Coordinates: 12°03′17″S 77°00′47.8″W
- System: Lima and Callao Metro station
- Line: Line 1

History
- Opened: 11 July 2011

Services
Preceding station	Lima and Callao Metro	Following station
Gamarra toward Villa El Salvador	Line 1	El Ángel toward Bayóvar
Location

Miguel Grau is a Lima and Callao Metro station on Line 1. The station is located between Gamarra and El Ángel. It was opened on 11 July 2011 as part of the extension of the line from Atocongo to Miguel Grau. The full revenue service started on 3 January 2012. On 25 July 2014 the line was extended to Bayóvar.
