= Bayóvar metro station =

Lima metro station

Bayóvar
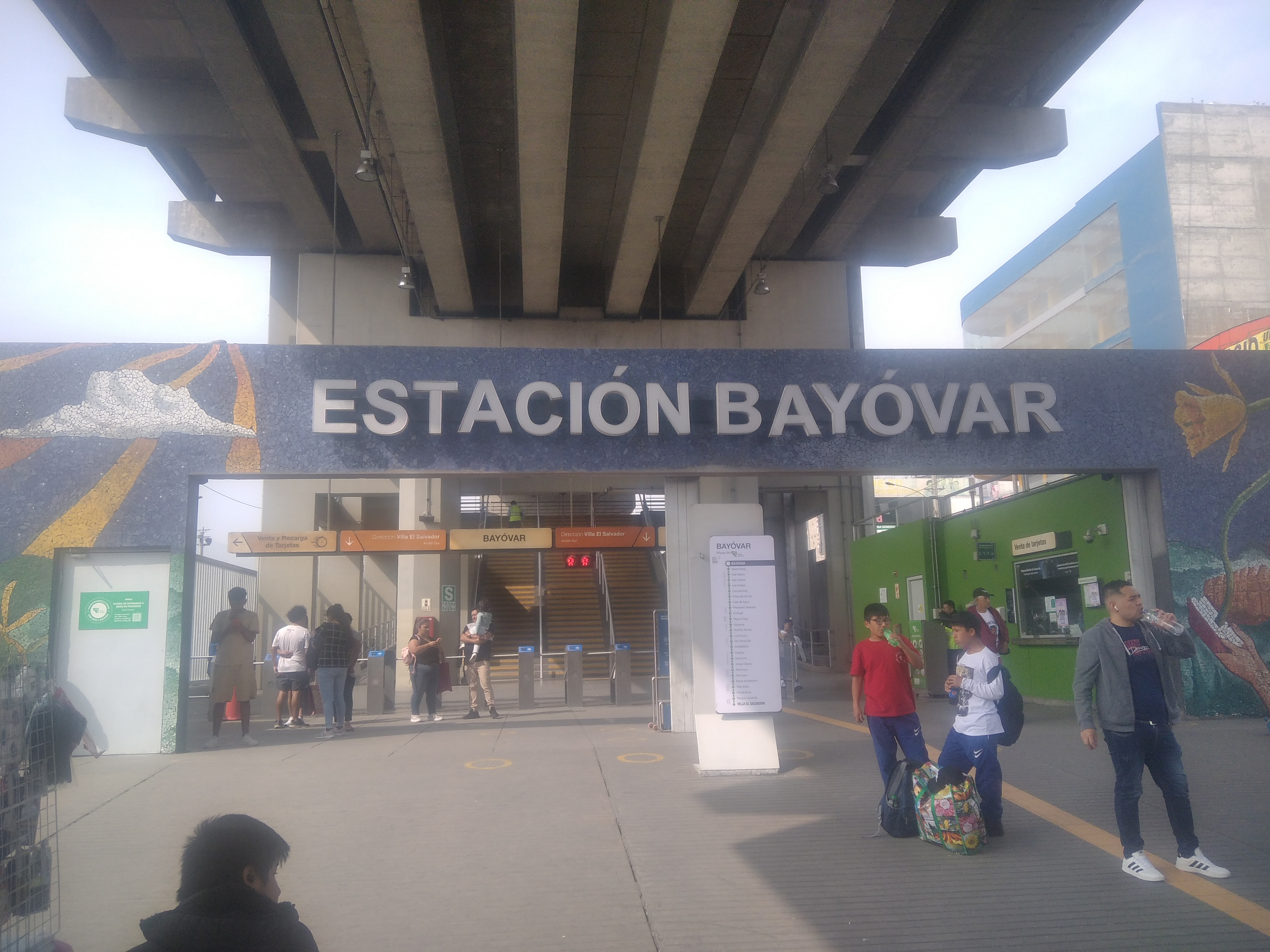

General information
- Location: Av. Fernando Wiesse; San Juan de Lurigancho, Lima; Peru
- Coordinates: 11°57′35.4″S 76°59′13.3″W
- System: Lima and Callao Metro station
- Line: Line 1

History
- Opened: 3 January 2012

Services
Preceding station	Lima and Callao Metro	Following station
Santa Rosa toward Villa El Salvador	Line 1	Terminus
Location

Bayóvar is a Lima and Callao Metro station on Line 1. It is the northern terminus of the line, and the adjacent station is Santa Rosa. The station was opened on 3 January 2012 as part of the extension of the line from Miguel Grau.
