= Lima and Callao Metro =

Rapid transit system in Lima, Peru

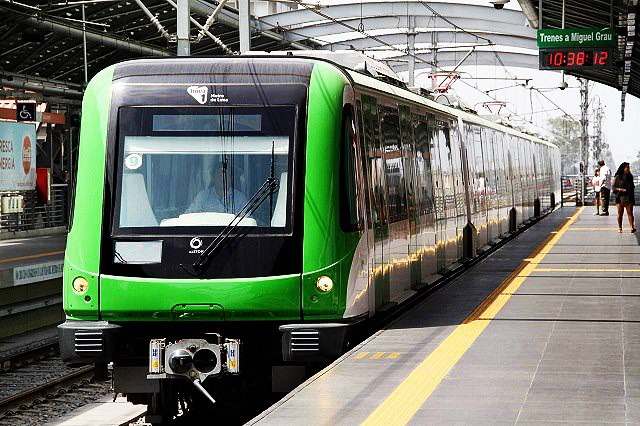
- Train Alstom Metropolis 9000 of Line 1

Overview
- Native name: Metro de Lima y Callao
- Owner: Authority for Urban Transport in Lima and Callao (ATU)
- Locale: Lima, Peru
- Transit type: Rapid transit
- Number of lines: 2
- Number of stations: 31 (29 under construction)
- Daily ridership: 692,000 per day
- Annual ridership: 124,134,820

Operation
- Began operation: April 28, 1990 (completion); April 11, 2011; 15 years ago (revenue service)
- Operator: Ferrovías (Grupo Emepa)
- Number of vehicles: 5 × AnsaldoBreda MB-300; 39 × Alstom Metropolis 9000

Technical
- System length: 39.6 km (24.6 mi)
- Track gauge: 1,435 mm (4 ft 8 1/2 in) standard gauge
- Electrification: 1,500 V DC overhead catenary
- Top speed: 80 km/h (50 mph)
System map

The Lima and Callao Metro (Spanish: Metro de Lima y Callao) is a rapid transit system that serves the cities of Lima and Callao, which make up the Lima metropolitan area. Metro lines 1 and 2 currently link the district of Villa El Salvador in the south of Lima with San Juan de Lurigancho in the northeast of the city, as well as a 5 km (3.1 mi) segment in the east of the metro area. Furthermore, there are four additional lines planned for the network.

Line 1 started full operations on July 28, 2014, after decades of delays. Construction of the line began during the first presidency of Alan García (1985–1990) with an initial seven stations, but the segment did not have the distance or demand required to make it commercially viable. Thus, the project stalled and became mired in accusations of bribery involving an investment of 226 million dollars co-financed by the Italian government.

During the second presidency of Alan García (2006–2011) the government resumed construction of Line 1, which opened for full revenue service in 2014. The completed line now totals 34.6 kilometers (21.5 mi) of elevated viaduct with 26 stations and crosses several districts: Villa El Salvador, Villa María del Triunfo, San Juan de Miraflores, Santiago de Surco, Surquillo, San Borja, San Luis, La Victoria, Lima District and San Juan de Lurigancho. The elevated viaduct of the Metro railway is the longest in Latin America, and was the longest in the world until it was surpassed by Wuhan Metro Line 1 in 2017.

Line 2 started operations on December 21, 2023 with the opening of its first 5 stations within Santa Anita district in the east of the city.

== History ==
=== 1970s: First Designs ===
Recreation of the original plan of the Lima and Callao metro network

Between 1972 and 1973, the "Metrolima" consortium elaborated the technical-economical feasibility studies and the pre-project of the "Mass Rapid Transit System for Passengers in the Metropolitan Area of Lima and Callao", approved by the Government of Peru in 1974. However, the political crisis generated by the sudden illness of President Juan Velasco Alvarado and the problem of his succession, added to the complexity of the Limean soil located in a highly seismic zone, as well as the international economic crisis of the time, made it impossible to get the necessary financing of US$317,000,000. This way, the "Metrolima" project, contemplating a total of 5 lines of underground train, was unable to be realized.

=== 1980s: Initial construction ===
In 1986, the first presidency of Alan García created the "Autonomous Authority for the Mass Transit Electrical Transport System Special Project" with the Supreme Decree N° 001-86 MIPRE, with degree of Law N° 24565. This entity called for a public contest for the implementation of this system, won by the Italian-capital "Consorcio Tralima" consortium. It started promptly the infrastructure work for an elevated viaduct metro.

Construction started by placing the first stone on October 18, 1986, making its construction the main promise made in 1987 by the newly elected Mayor of Lima and member of the government party Jorge del Castillo.

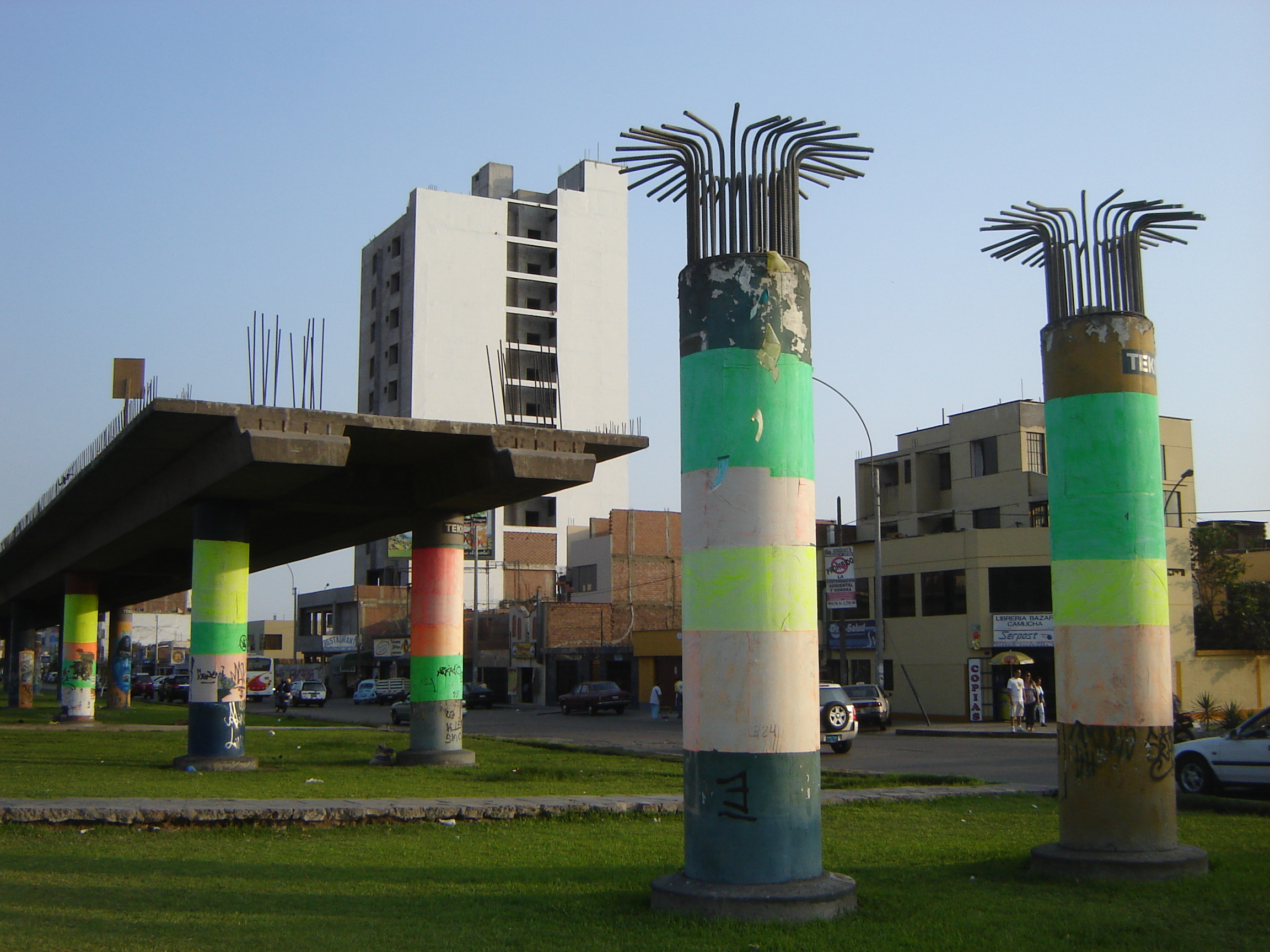
The construction of Line 1 of the Lima Metro remained paralyzed for over 20 years until it was resumed in 2010.

The work began with a maintenance facility in the district of Villa El Salvador, south of the city, where the trains were meant to be stored and receive preventive maintenance. Construction advanced at a relatively fast pace, but when Line 1 reached the Atocongo Station, the country became immersed in a deep economic and social crisis, in addition to corruption scandals involving President Garcia, which halted construction. It was meant to continue through Av. Aviación up to the Dos de Mayo Hospital in the city center, but the assigned budget had been already spent.

On April 28, 1990, three months before ending the first government by APRA. Alan García celebrated the opening of the line, despite the fact that the line was incomplete and did not reach areas of higher demand and density. The metro remained nearly useless in practice, given that the required investments for its operation and maintenance were unjustifiable for its ridership. In spite of that, the subsequent governments tried to revive the project because of the significant investment put into the trains and infrastructure. On several occasions, candidates in both presidential and municipal elections used it politically with the promise of finishing the project, although it never materialized.

The municipalities crossed by the metro started to cover the unfinished segments in an attempt to diminish the negative impact on the urban landscape. This way, the centre median of Av. Aviación had pillars with grass in order to avoid the invasion of ambulatory commerce (which represented a large problem in Lima at the time). Vegetation was planted in order to cover the uncovered pieces of steel and concrete of the unfinished project. Some districts also painted the columns and walls with images of Peruvian landscapes and nature, deeming the project as definitively cancelled.

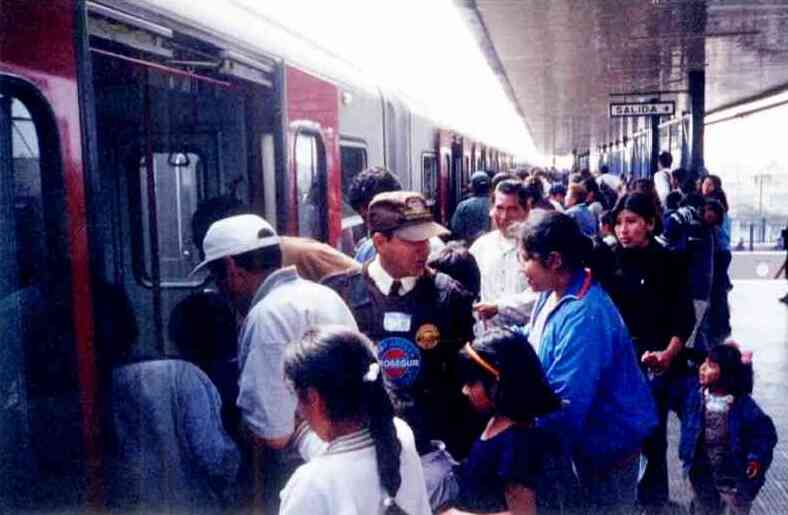
The Lima Metro at its beginnings

On August 5, 2001, the AATE (Electrical Train Autonomous Authority) was passed on to the Metropolitan Municipality of Lima through the Urgency Decree N° 058–2001. Subsequently, the Lima Metro only made trips to give preventive maintenance to the trains.

The columns and rights-of-way of the train remained, for more than two decades, as a living example of the bad management of the first APRA government between 1985 and 1990. Several artistic and musical groups took advantage of the situation to satirize the project. The "El Tren Eléctrico" song by Juan Luis Dammert and the imaginary launch campaign denominated "Lima 2427" (calculated finishing year given the progress rate the project had thus far), launched by artist Camila Bustamante. This campaign placed stickers in the supposed future stations and gave out informative flyers on the streets, allowing the general public to find out that the project didn't have just one line but seven interconnected lines servicing the whole city.

=== 2010s: Completion of the first line ===
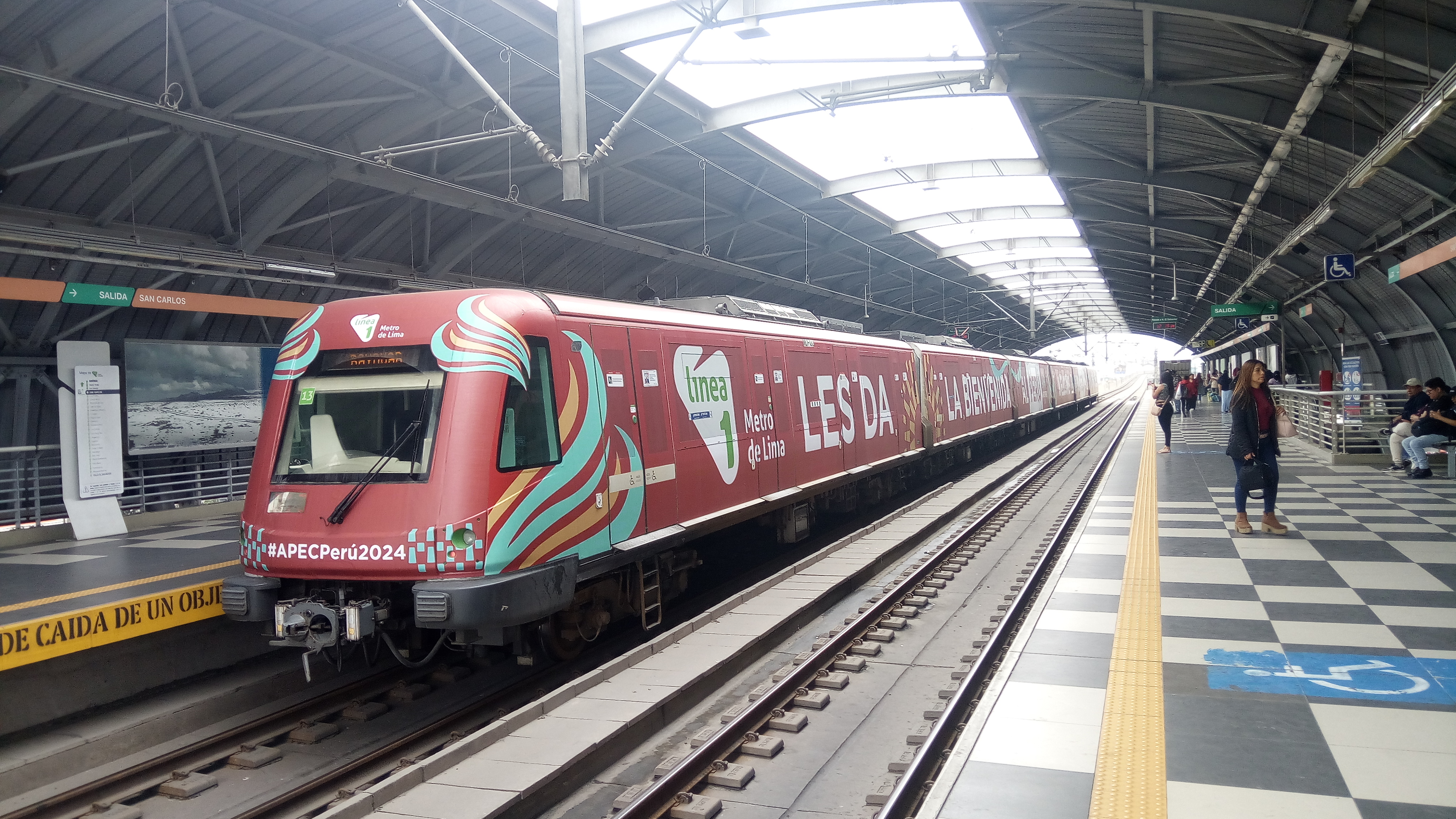
Train at the San Carlos Station

In 2009, the government decided that the Ministry of Transport and Communications (MTC) would retake the administration of the AATE (Electrical Train Autonomous Authority). It also put an entity called "Provias Nacional" in charge of organizing a public bid to select the consortium that would build the remaining sections of the project. Financing would come from a foreign debt operation with the Development Bank of Latin America and the Caribbean (CAF) for US$300 million. This credit was approved on August 18, 2009.

On December 2, 2009, the government approved for the "Consorcio Tren Eléctrico Lima" consortium, (formed by Brazilian company Odebrecht and Peruvian company Graña y Montero) to build the line from the unfinished first segment until Grau station in Downtown Lima. Construction started on March 2, 2010, and the second segment opened on July 11, 2011. The third segment of the line that connects Downtown Lima to the northeastern district of San Juan de Lurigancho opened for public service on July 25, 2014.

On December 23, 2010, president Alan Garcia established through supreme decree 059-2010-MTC the Basic Metro Network of Lima and Callao, signaling the implementation of a network consisting of 5 lines of metro for Lima, contemplating the construction of ground, elevated and underground segments.

=== 2020s: Construction of second line ===
The consortium "Nuevo Metro de Lima", consisting of the companies COSAPI (Peru), Impregilo, Ansaldo Breda & Ansaldo STS (Italy), Iridium, and Vialia (Spain) won the bid for the construction of Line 2 of the Lima Metro, and a segment of Line 4 that will connect it to the airport. The contract was signed on April 28, 2014.

Though initially scheduled for completion in 2021, only the first segment of the project, spanning 5 kilometers and 5 stations, has been completed as of January 2024. This segment opened for operations in December 2023.

== Line 1 ==
The Lima Metro first phase has sixteen passenger stations, located at an average distance of 1.2 km (0.7 mi). It starts its path in the Industrial Park of Villa El Salvador, south of the city, continuing on to Av. Pachacútec in Villa María del Triunfo and then to Av. Los Héroes in San Juan de Miraflores. Afterwards, it continues through Av. Tomás Marsano in Surco to reach Ov. Los Cabitos and then on to Av. Aviación to finish in Av. Grau in the city center.

Currently, Line 1 has a fleet of trains from the 1980s by AnsaldoBreda, put in service through the 16 stations. This fleet includes an additional 42 trains in order to be able to service with the adequate frequencies, contemplating 26 stations in total, the integral remodeling of the current stations and the revamping of wagons, including the installation of air conditioning among other facilities and 19 new Alstom trains similar to the 9000 Series on the Barcelona Metro. Left-hand running is used on this line, unlike the most metro systems in South America.

Prior to July 2014, Line 1 was 21.48 kilometers (13.3 mi) long, operating from Villa El Salvador (where the maintenance depot is located) to the Miguel Grau station in Downtown Lima.

The third phase of Line 1 was completed on July 25, 2014, with the opening of the 12.4-kilometer (7.7 mi), ten-station extension of Line 1. With the extension now open, Line 1 is 34.6 kilometers (21.5 mi) in total serving 26 stations.

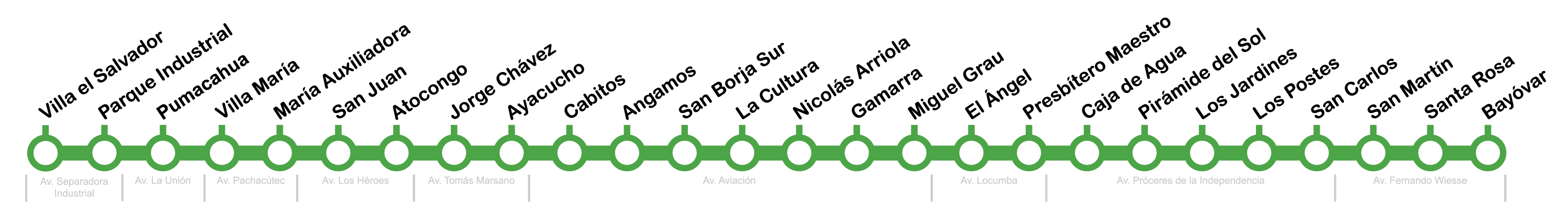
Lima Metro Line 1 extension.

== Line 2 ==
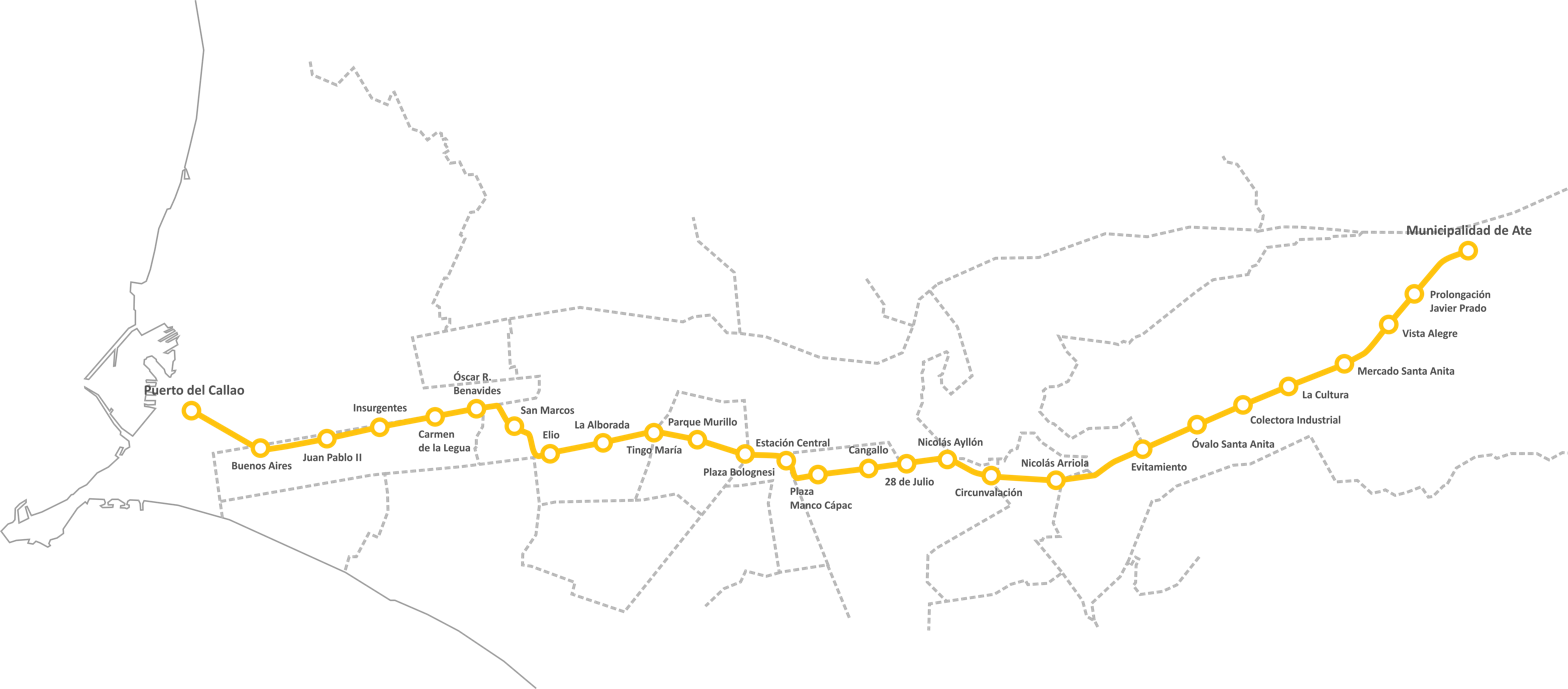
Map of the entire projected length of Line 2, including all stations.

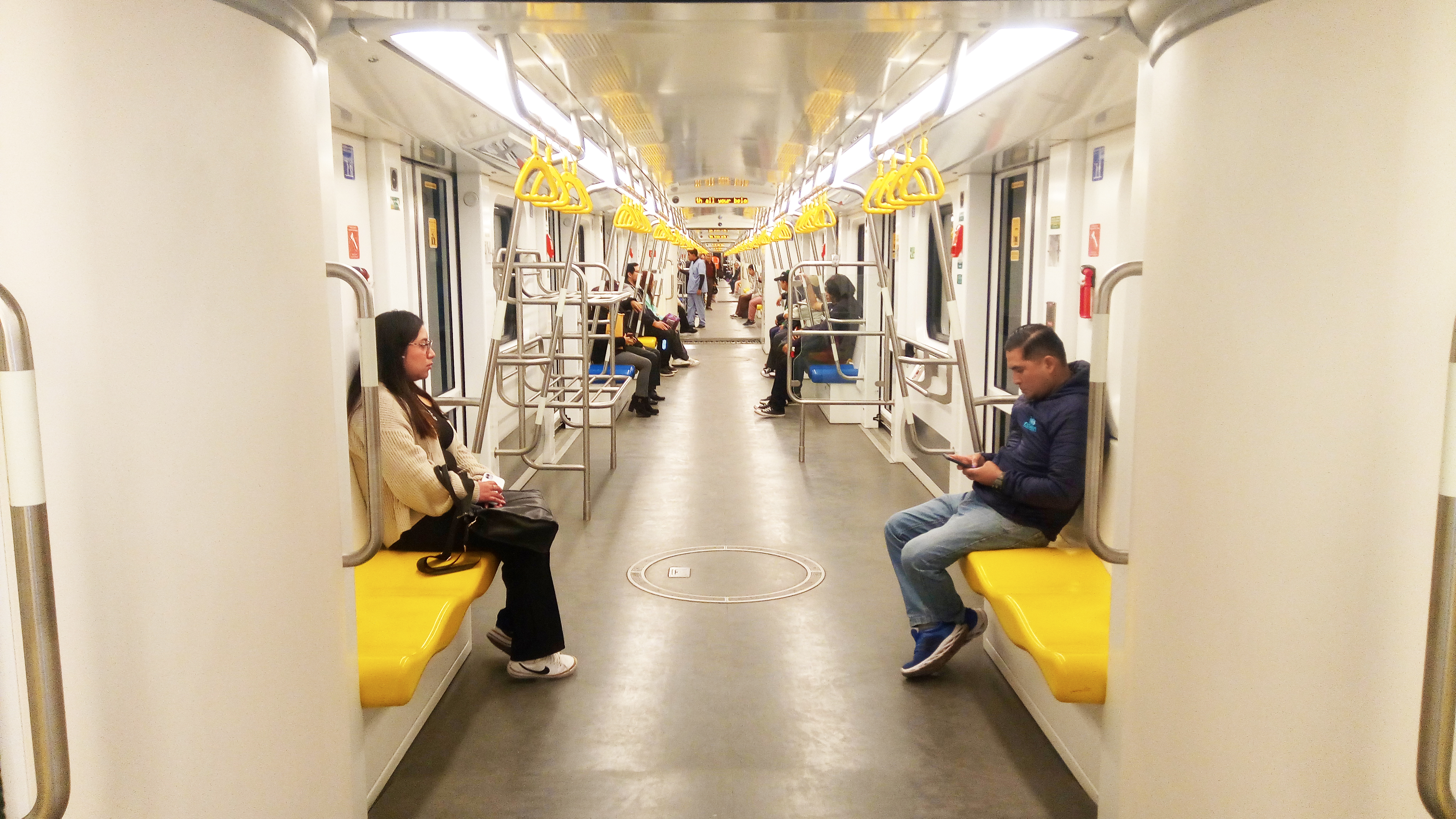
Line 2

On February 15, 2012, at the conclusion of discussions between the Central Government and the Municipalities of Lima and Callao, President Ollanta Humala announced the upcoming construction of the Lima Metro Line 2. It is to be a west-east line, entirely underground, with a length of 27 km. The line will link the port of Callao in the west with the Historic Center of Lima, along with the eastern districts of Santa Anita and Ate. Furthermore, the line will be completely automated and will include accessibility features for people with physical disabilities.

The line will interconnect with the current BRT Central Station in Lima's historic center (which is also underground). Concurrently, the project also includes the construction of the first stage of line 4 (8 km), which will connect the system at Carmen de la Legua station to the International Airport.

An international consortium won the bidding for this project; and construction started in September 2014.

=== Stage 1a ===
The first stage of Line 2 (1a) opened on 21 December 2023. It includes a five-station stretch spanning 5 kilometers from Evitamiento station to Mercado Santa Anita station. The five operational stations are not yet connected to Line 1 of the system, but it is projected the connection will be made during subsequent stages of the project. The rest of the line is currently under construction, and projected to be completed by 2028.

== New lines ==
=== Line 3 ===
On March 21, 2012, Lima's mayor Susana Villaran presented a feasibility study of an underground metro line that follows in large parts the route of Line 3 as originally planned by the central government. The study was done in 2009 for the municipality of Lima, with support from the French government.

According to the mayor's statements, these studies will be under consideration by the Ministry of Transport and Communication, and construction of this line will take only four years. The line will be underground from north to south, serving a section of the city with high ridership potential. This line is described as a "high speed" line, based on the distances between stations.

On May 13, 2013, the Ministry of Transport and Communications (MTC) said that the government had also awarded concessions for the construction of lines 3 and 4 by July 2016, out of the five lines that constitute the system.

=== Line 4 ===
On May 9, 2012, the director of the Private Investment Promotion Agency (Proinversión), Hector Rene Rodriguez, announced that the MTC (Ministry of Transport and Communication) would construct Lines 2 and 4 simultaneously. Line 4 will follow an east–west route connecting the district of La Molina with Jorge Chavez International Airport.

The first stage of the line will consist of a branch linking Line 2 with Jorge Chávez International Airport and will feature eight stations. Construction for this section of the line began alongside construction of Line 2 in 2024, and is expected to last four years.

=== Line 5 ===
Metro Line 5 will connect the districts in the south of the city, like Miraflores, Barranco and Chorrillos; with a final station next to the south Panamerican highway Villa toll. By now it is planned but there is no studies of design nor construction yet.

=== Line 6 ===
Metro Line 6 has been presented in 2014 as a private initiative and is under evaluation. These studies will determine technical aspects regarding whether Line 6 will be underground, aerial or both. The line has a length of 32 km extending, from the Naranjal Station of BRT system Metropolitano through Av. Tupac Amaru, Los Alisos Avenue, Universitaria Avenue, Bertolotto Avenue, Perez Aranibar Avenue and Angamos-Primavera Avenue.

== System ==
=== List ===
Line	Termini	Length	Stations	Opening Date	Type
	Bayóvar – Villa El Salvador	34.6 km	26	11 July 2011	Viaduct
	El Agustino – Santa Anita	5 km	5 (as of 2026)	21 December 2023	Underground

== See also ==
- Transport in Lima
- El Metropolitano
- List of metro systems
- List of rapid transit systems
- List of Latin American rail transit systems
