= Surquillo =

District in Lima, Peru

- District
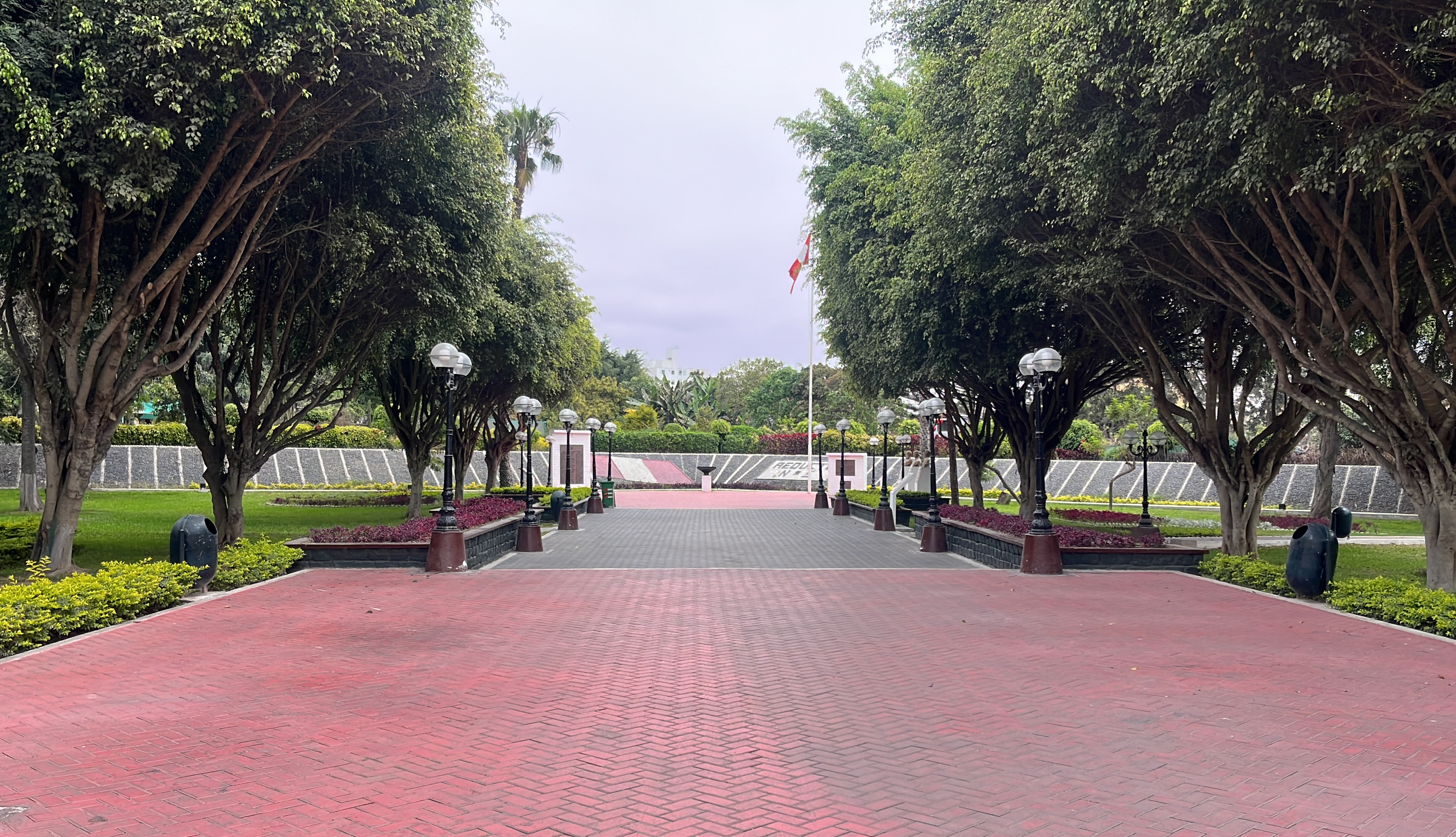
- General view of Redoubt Park

- Coat of arms

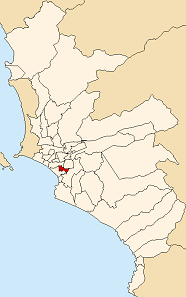
- Location of Surquillo District in Lima Province
- Coordinates: 12°7′2″S 77°1′14″W
- Country: Peru
- Department: Lima
- Province: Lima
- Founded: July 15, 1949

Government
  - Mayor: Cintia Loayza

Area
  - Total: 3.46 km^{2} (1.34 sq mi)
- Elevation: 105 m (344 ft)

Population (2023)
  - Total: 104,832
  - Density: 30,300/km^{2} (78,500/sq mi)
- Time zone: UTC-5 (PET)
- Postal code: 15038
- UBIGEO: 150141
- Website: munisurquillo.gob.pe

Surquillo is a district of Lima, Peru. The district is bordered by the districts of San Isidro and San Borja on the north; by Miraflores on the south and west; and by Santiago de Surco on the east.

== Name ==
In times past, this part of Lima was already known as the "Chacras de Surquillo". At present, the exact origin of this name has not yet been found, although it is believed that the name "Surquillo" is a diminutive of Surco. After the founding of Lima in 1535, Francisco Pizarro found, apart from the curacazgo of Lima, other lordships and chiefdoms in the area, such as Rimactampu, Maranga, Carabayllo, Lurigancho, Linche, Surquillo and Surco. According to the researcher and historian of the Pontifical Catholic University of Peru, Juan Luis Orrego Penagos, the origin of the name Surquillo comes from the viceregal era, when a community of indigenous people emerged in this place that bore similarities to the town of Santiago de Surco. As a result of this, the authorities began to refer to the new settlement as Surquillo.

== History ==
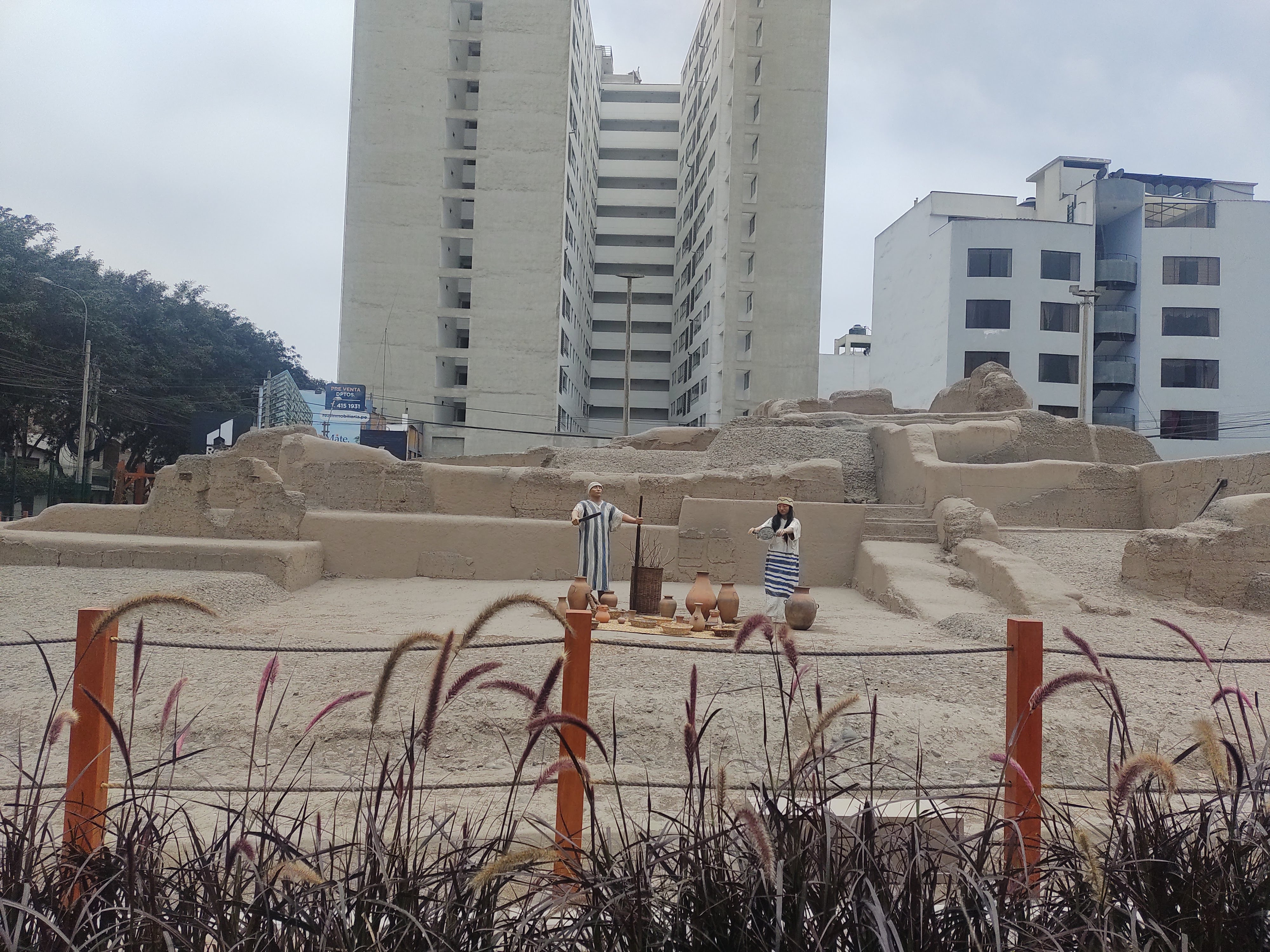
Panoramic view of Huaca La Merced.

Surquillo was first inhabited by people from different cultures during the Pre-Incan Era. This is evidenced by the discovery of small pre-Inca ruins such as the Huaca La Merced (belonging to the Ichma culture), which dates back to approximately the Late Intermediate period.

During the Conquest of Peru, the inhabitants of the area surrounding the La Merced huaca were possibly moved to the Surco reduction due to its proximity. In this period, the conqueror Francisco Pizarro, using a royal decree, on May 22, 1534, transferred the land of a part of the current Surquillo (at that time known as "Las Chacras de Surquillo") to the Convent of Our Lady of La Merced to use it as farmland. Eventually, Surquillo (also known as 'Surco Chico') evolved as a marginalized neighborhood, populated mainly by people of limited resources, located on the route that connected Lima with San Miguel de Miraflores. Later, the hacienda of the same name arose, belonging to the Mercedarians. On February 16, 1849, the Convent of La Merced transferred the land of the estate to General Martínez de Aparacio, who would transfer the land to another owner some time later.

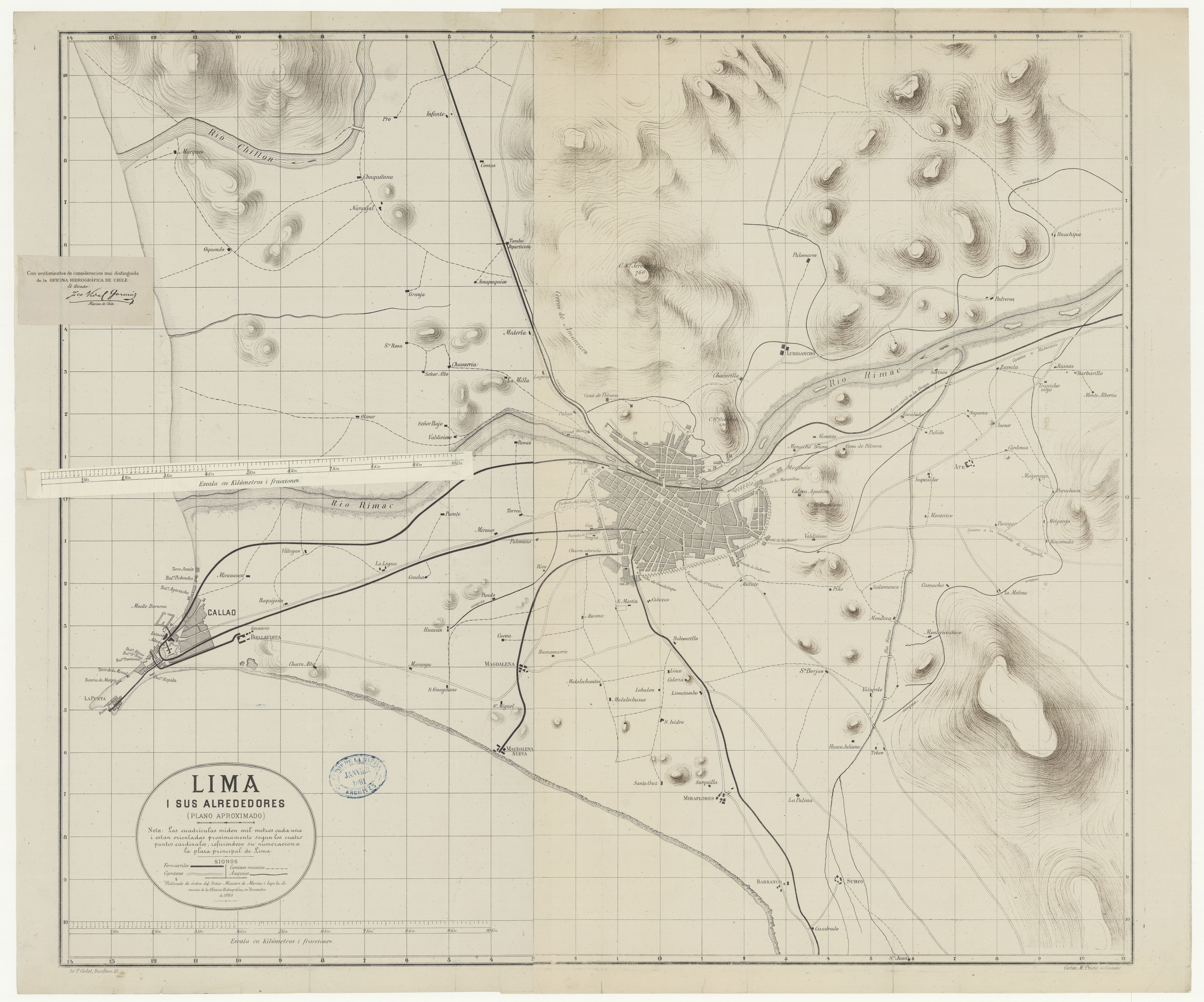
Map of Lima and surroundings in 1880.

During the War of the Pacific, President Nicolás de Piérola ordered the construction of a defense line made up of fortifications called 'redoubts' to defend the city of Lima from invading Chilean troops. Among them, one was built in Surquillo called "Reducto N°5", which is currently located in the park of the same name, on Angamos Avenue, near the border with the San Borja district. In this fortification, the Battalion No. 8 of the Reserve, composed of 300 men, fought, which were able to initially repel and stop the attack of the Chilean troops commanded by the Chilean general Patricio Lynch. However, the defenders were forced to evacuate their positions, due to the Chilean troops that outnumbered and outgunned them. Eventually, a Peruvian soldier by the name of Manuel Castañeda blew up the redoubt, preventing Chilean troops from capturing the arsenal.

=== 20th century ===
At the beginning of the 20th century, Tomás Marsano would begin to urbanize part of Miraflores and Surquillo, the latter with the founding of the urbanization known as "Surquillo" (currently called Surquillo Viejo), through the Compañía Urbanizadora Surquillo, which owned land in this part of the capital, including the La Calera de La Merced and Primavera haciendas.

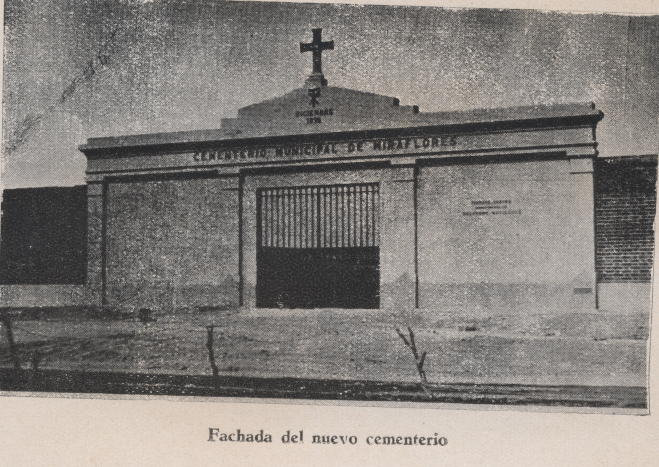
Old façade of the entrance to the Miraflores Municipal Cemetery (current Surquillo Municipal Cemetery).

However, Surquillo was urbanized differently than that used in Miraflores. Surquillo was designed with blocks of the same size as those from Miraflores, but with long, narrow and more economical lots. Likewise, no park was laid out unlike what happened in Miraflores. These lands were sold mainly to low-income migrants from the south of the country. Furthermore, the urban authorization for which the inhabitants of Surquillo paid was not delivered. According to the former mayor of Miraflores, Eduardo Villena Rey, Tomás Marsano promised to implement the area with water, drainage, paving and sidewalks, but he failed to fulfill said contract. Miraflores proposed providing basic services to the Surquillo neighborhood, but the residents refused because they believed it would exempt Tomás Marsano from his obligations as an urban developer. Eventually, Miraflores reached an agreement with Tomás Marsano, where he gave up a 10,000 m^{2} land on the La Calera de la Merced farm for the construction of the new Miraflores Municipal Cemetery (current Surquillo Municipal Cemetery).

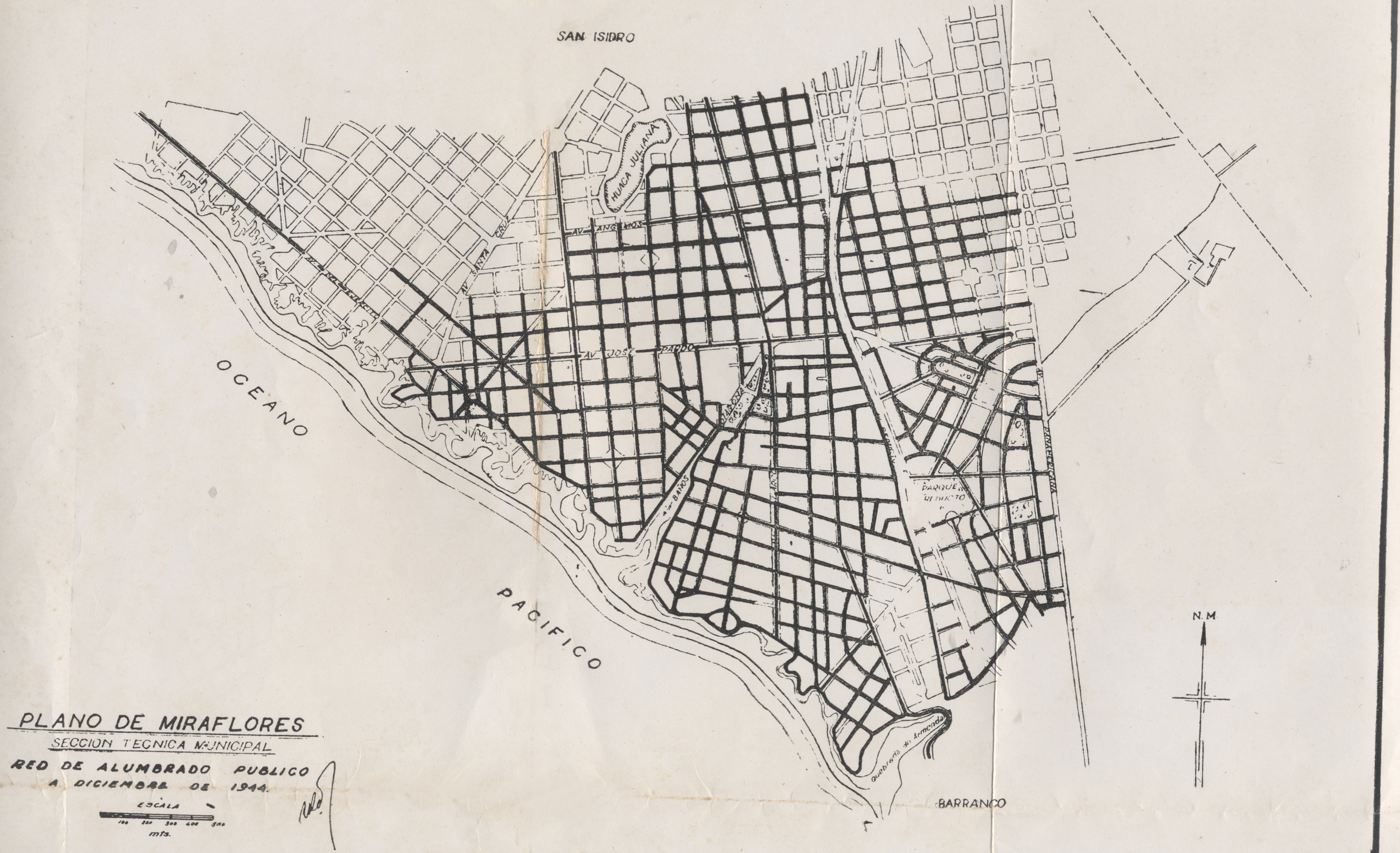
1944 map of Miraflores, including Surquillo Viejo (upper right).

In the first years since its urbanization, the proliferation of narrow alleys and small country houses was generated, due to the typology of large lots for people with limited resources. Subsequently, the population of Surquillo grew rapidly, going from 7,000 inhabitants in 1935 to 40,000 in 1949. Prior to its urbanization, according to the Gazetteer of Peru, Surquillo had a population of 120 inhabitants in 1922. In the 1930s, large industrial factories appeared, due to the fact that it had a working-class neighborhood with large, low-cost land and the lack of zoning in the area.

Before 1949, Surquillo belonged to the Miraflores district as the "Fundo de Surquillo", from which it would be separated on July 15 of that same year at the request of a group of owners, during the presidency of Manuel Odría, by means of the Decree Law No. 11058 for being a district that is too large to take care of the needs of its increasingly growing population, as well as for not providing basic services to Surquillo. The limits established for the district were the following:

To the north with the San Isidro District, starting from the intersection of Paseo de la República with Panama Street, continue along the extension of this street, passing through the center of the Limatambo roundabout, continues with the axis of the extension of said street, bordering the Limatambo airport, to the south, to the east and continues until it meets the extension of Javier Prado Avenue, along which it will turn towards the East following said extension until its intersection with the line of the Railway from Lima to Lurín to the Surco River, along whose bank Right continues until its intersection with the highway to Atocongo. To the south and west with a broken line that begins with the intersection of Panama Street with the axis of Paseo de la República and continues to the south the axis of said Paseo until its intersection with Avenida Andrés Avelino Cáceres until its intersection with Av. Panamericana (Roosevelt) continuing along the extension of Av. Cáceres until its intersection with the Atocongo highway, following the axis of said highway to the south until its intersection with the Surco River.

— Brigade Manager Manuel A. Odría, President of the Military Government Junta

In the 1950s, the informal occupation of Casas Huertas occurred, which were originally agricultural fields that, eventually, the new owners converted into tenements for rent. Some time later, this part would be consolidated with a layout of large blocks and narrow alleys. The sale of small plots of land and the alley-type urbanization without any property title led to the consolidation of the neighborhood as a "barriada." Likewise, in the 60s the invasion of Villa Victoria would be consolidated. On the other hand, given the concentration of the population and the appearance of the so-called "barriadas", in turn the appearance of the phenomenon of urban violence where the nickname "Chicago Chico" (Small Chicago) appears, a term that increased the bad reputation of Surquillo and will place it as an ineligible district for residence.

Several years later, the La Calera estate began to be urbanized in 1968 through small developments by business groups. New urbanizations would be founded such as Jorge Chávez (1970), Los Sauces (1974), El Pedregal, La Calera de la Merced, VIPEP, Los Jardines de Higuereta, Las Orquídeas, among others.

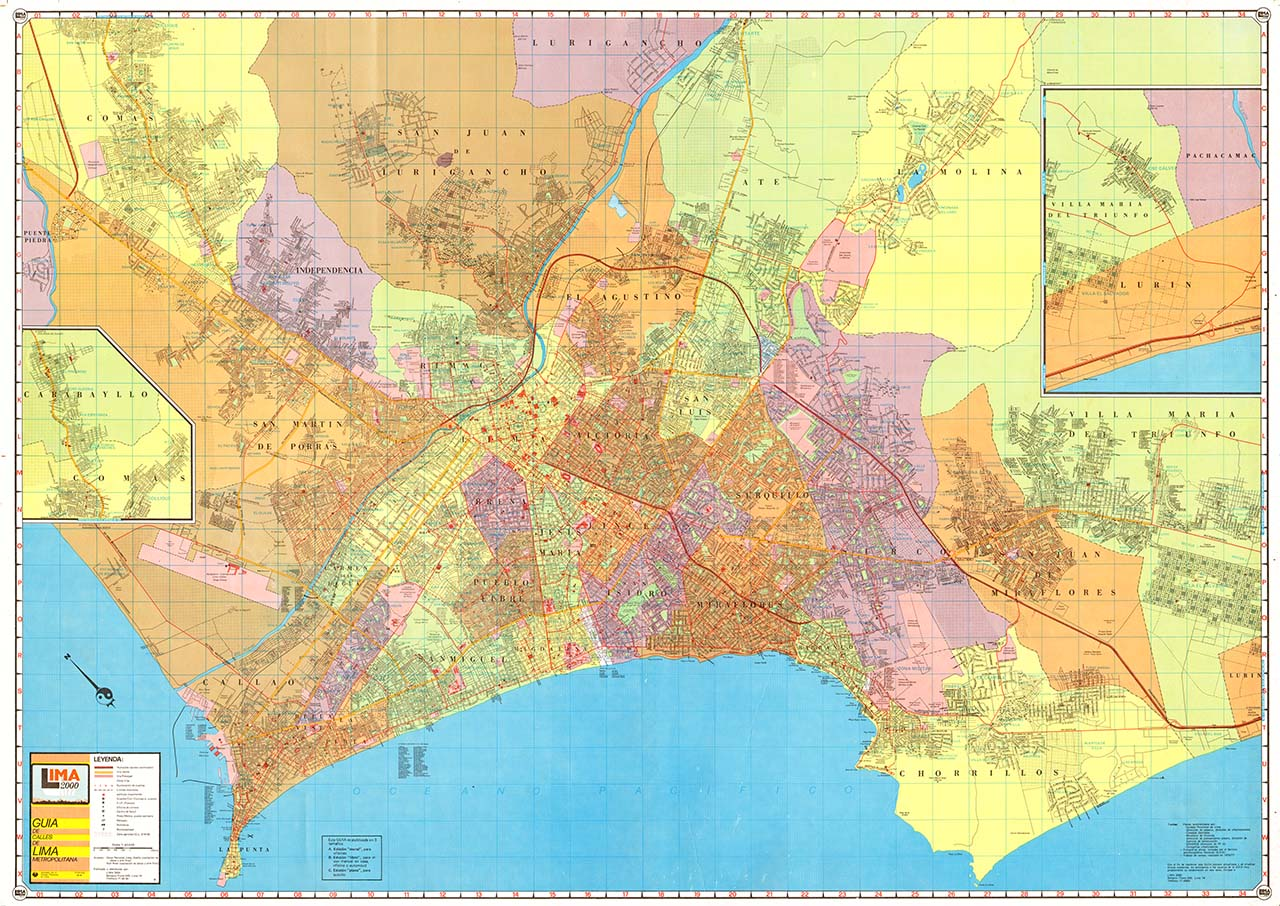
1977 MML map of Lima.

On June 1, 1983, during the second government of Fernando Belaúnde, Surquillo would lose more than half of its territory, due to the creation of the San Borja district, through Law No. 23604. San Borja established its limits between the avenues Canada, Circunvalación, the Panamericana Sur highway, and Primavera - Angamos, Miguel Iglesias, José Gálvez Barrenechea and Guardia Civil avenues. The new district is segregated from the district of Surquillo, and at the same time, absorbs territories from the districts of Santiago de Surco and San Luis.

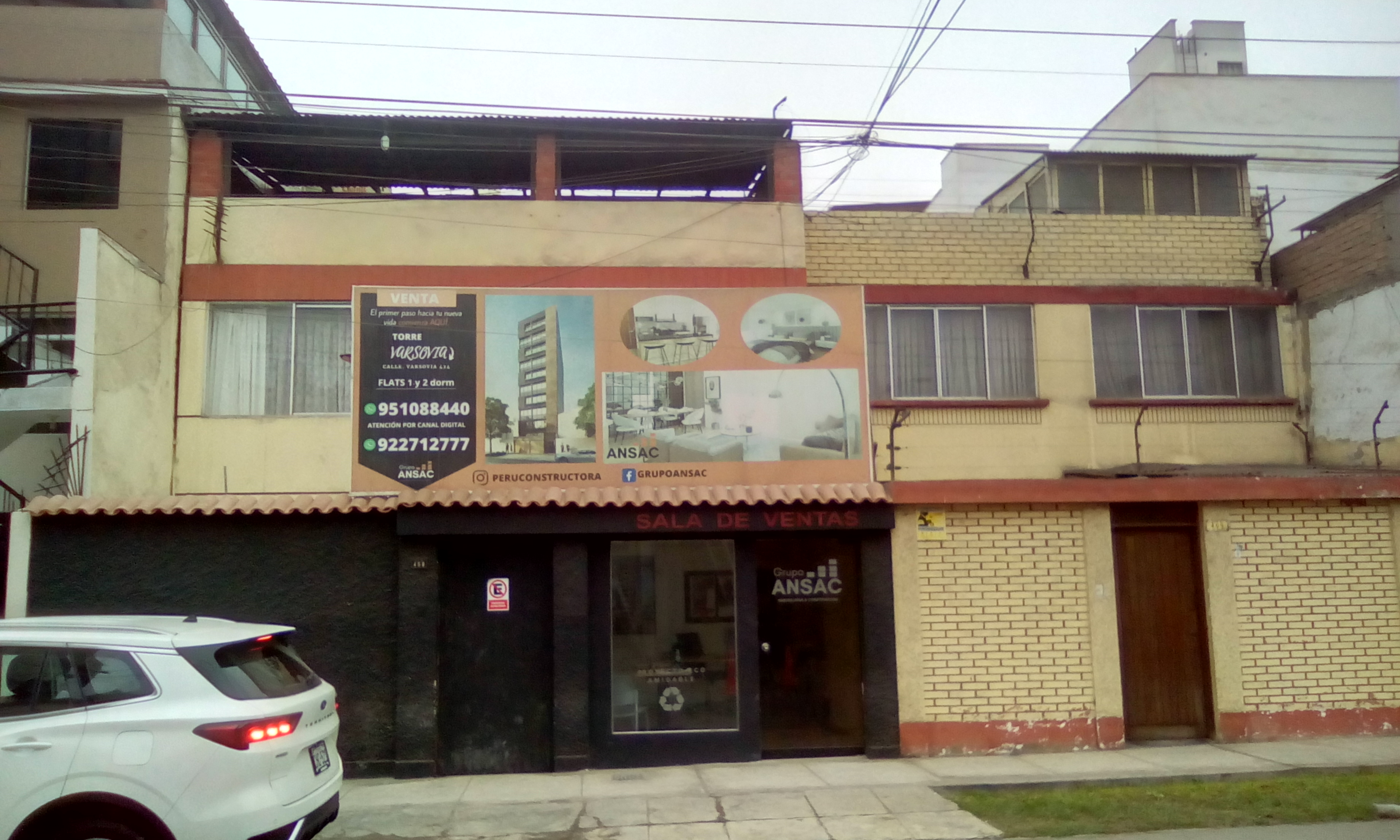
Facade of the house (left) where Abimael Guzmán was captured.

In June 1992, during the Internal conflict in Peru, Operation Huascaura took place, in which members of the GEIN captured Luis Alberto Arana Franco, known as "Sotil". During his interrogation, Arana Franco revealed the location of Abimael Guzmán.

«The car was driven by a pituca miraflorina (in reference to Maritza Garrido-Lecca), they blindfolded me. "President Gonzalo" asked me to rent a house in the Urbanization Los Sauces, Surquillo. And the next day I went there. Suddenly I saw the same couple who had taken me to meet Abimael get out of a car and I left.

In July, GEIN agents had set up shop in front of the house which was Abimael Guzmán's refuge. This house belonged to a colonel of the Peruvian Investigative Police. After two months of surveillance and monitoring, on September 12 at 5:30 p.m., GEIN agents broke into the building, thus capturing Abimael Guzmán, leader and founder of Sendero Luminoso, and other members of the terrorist organization.

=== Recent history ===
During the 90s the district began to migrate from factories and large industries to a greater number of services. This process was completed in the 2000s, when the majority of factories were relocated to the peripheries. Currently the district is focused on the gastronomic sector with the consolidation of restaurants. Likewise, the commercial sector has increased within the district, highlighting the inauguration of the Open Plaza Angamos shopping center in 2010.

== Politics ==
Surquillo is under the jurisdiction of its own district municipality, as well as that of the Metropolitan Municipality of Lima.

=== List of mayors ===
Since 2023, the incumbent mayor is Cintia Loayza.

№	Mayor	Party	Term	
№	Mayor	Party	Begin	End
1	Luis Faura Bedoya	—N/a	1949	1951
2	Juan Ventura Rossi	—N/a	1951	1954
3	Alfonso Barrantes López	—N/a	1954	1956
4	Luis Samanamud Maldonado	—N/a	1956	1957
5	Juan Palacios Pintado	—N/a	1957	1957
6	Oscar Dyer Contreras	—N/a	1957	1960
7	Armando Coronado Huamán	—N/a	1960	1961
8	Joaquín Planas Gamero	—N/a	1961	1962
9	Jorge Quiroz Rivas	—N/a	1962	1963
10	Eduardo Salas Neri	—N/a	1963	1964
11	Humberto Toledo Rosas	AP-DC	1964	1967
12	Humberto Toledo Rosas	AP-DC	1967	1970
13	Eduardo Niezen Menaut	—N/a	1970	1971
14	Alfredo Batisttini More	—N/a	1971	1971
15	Augusto Díaz Farro	—N/a	1971	1972
16	Amado Vásquez Castillo	—N/a	1972	1973
17	Otto Espinoza Carmen	—N/a	1973	1974
18	Bernardo Paredes Grieve	—N/a	1974	1977
19	Félix Yamamoto Hong	—N/a	1977	1978
20	Luis Beteta Graziani	—N/a	1978	1979
21	Germán Zegarra Farfán	—N/a	1979	1979
22	Jaime Ortiz Tarrillo	—N/a	1979	1980
23	Pablo Castro Colina	—N/a	1980	1980
24	Adolfo Merino Martigena	—N/a	1980	1981
25	Juan Alvarado Vela	AP	1981	1984
26	Wilfredo Álvarez Valer	IU	1984	1987
27	Hugo Sánchez Medina	APRA	1987	1989
28	Julio Zegarra Farfán	APRA	1989	1990
29	Guido Casassa Bacigalupo	FREDEMO	1990	1993
30	Guido Casassa Bacigalupo	PPC	1993	1996
31	Edwin Laguerre Gallardo	SP	1996	1996
32	Carlos Iparraguirre Gallo	PDSP	1996	1999
33	Guido Casassa Bacigalupo	MIVV	1999	2002
34	Gustavo Sierra Ortiz	MIVV	2002	2003
35	Gustavo Sierra Ortiz	UN	2003	2007
36	Gustavo Sierra Ortiz	UN	2007	2011
37	José Luis Huamaní González	PPC	2011	2015
38	José Luis Huamaní González	PPC	2015	2019
39	Giancarlo Casassa Sánchez	PPC	2019	2023
40	Cintia Loayza Álvarez	RP	2023	Incumbent

=== Twin cities ===
Surquillo is twinned with the following municipalities:

- San Isidro District, Lima
- Santiago de Surco District, Lima
- Municipality of Itagüí

== Geography ==
The district of Surquillo is located west of the city of Lima, forming part of the subregion called Lima Centro. It has an area of 4.49 km², which makes it one of the smallest districts in the province of Lima. Meanwhile, its average height is 105 meters above sea level. It is part of Lima's Cono Centro, an unofficial subregion of the city.

=== Boundaries ===
It limits to the north with the district of San Isidro, through streets 3 Sur and 32. Then, it also limits to the north, with the district of San Borja, through avenues José Gálvez Barrenechea, Miguel Iglesias and Angamos Este. Subsequently, it limits to the east and southeast with the district of Santiago de Surco, through El Sauce Avenue, Intihuatana Avenue and Gerona Street, following the path of the Surco River. Afterwards, it borders to the south, with the Miraflores district through Tomás Marsano Avenue, and Alejandro Deustua and Juan José Calle streets. Next, the limit continues through Manuel Arce de Oliva Avenue, Manuel Almenara Street, and Roca and Boloña, República de Panamá, Andrés Avelino Cáceres and Ricardo Palma avenues. Subsequently, the limit continues to the west, through Paseo de la República avenue. And finally, it limits to the northwest, also with the district of San Isidro, through Andrés Aramburú Avenue.

=== Climate ===
Climate data for Lima
Month	Jan	Feb	Mar	Apr	May	Jun	Jul	Aug	Sep	Oct	Nov	Dec	Year
Record high °F	79	79	79	75	72	68	66	64	66	68	72	75	72
Record high °C	26	26	26	24	22	20	19	18	19	20	22	24	22
Average precipitation days	1	1	0	0	1	2	3	3	3	2	2	0	16
Average rainy days	4	2	3	2	5	11	12	15	13	7	5	3	82
Average relative humidity (%)	85	80	80	85	85	85	85	85	85	85	85	85	84.2
Mean monthly sunshine hours	179.1	169	139.2	184	116.4	50.6	28.6	32.3	37.3	65.3	89	139.2	1,284
Source: Weatherbase (Temperature, precipitation and humidity). and Universidad Complutense de Madrid (Sunlight)

== Demographics ==
In 2023, Surquillo had an approximate population of 104,832 inhabitants and a population density of 29,863.3 inhabitants per km^{2}, making it the most densely populated district in Metropolitan Lima and Peru. It is inhabited by 50.2% of families from a high socioeconomic stratum, with incomes greater than 2,400 soles. While, the remaining percentage corresponds to families of medium-high and medium socioeconomic level. In 2019, its human development index was 0.8171, making it the tenth district of Lima with the highest HDI.

demographic vertical bar chart of Surquillo between 1993 and 2023
Sources: 1993, 2007, 2017 and 2023 population.

== Culture ==
=== Landmarks ===
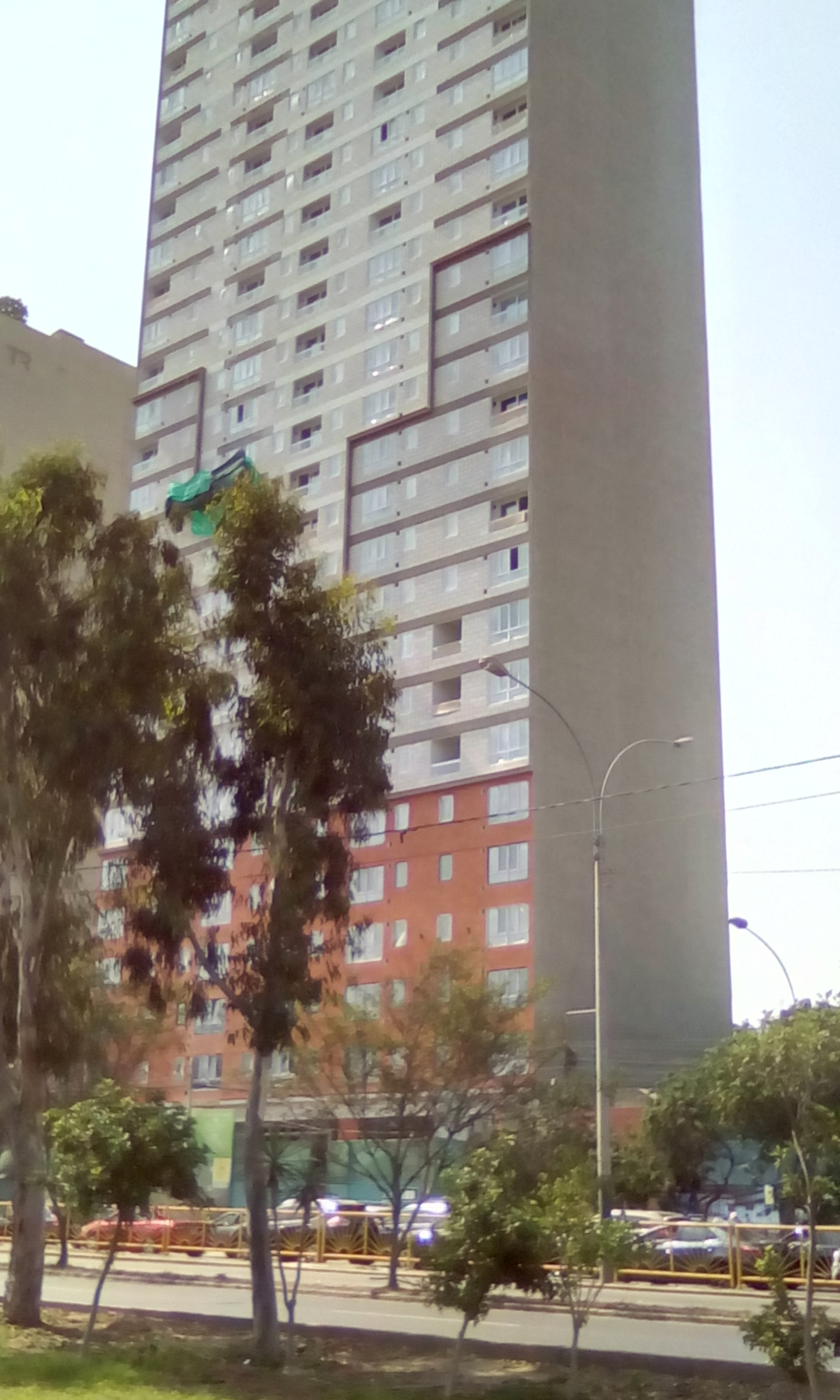
Morar Tower under construction.

Surquillo is a district that borders upper and upper middle class districts. This is why many real estate agencies have put their interest in the district for the construction of multi-family homes.

The trapezoidal area that would be the northern and best-known part of the district is the most populated part of Surquillo; There the old area of Surquillo coexists with popular urbanizations such as Villa Victoria or Casas Huertas; However, it is the most commercially active and increasingly developed part. This area is also characterized by the lack of green areas, as well as the high rates of crimes committed in this part of the district, which causes Surquillo to be seen as a very dangerous district. On the other hand, in 2023, the Municipality of Surquillo won a project to prioritize pedestrian and bicycle mobility through the implementation of superblocks, promoted by the Municipality of Lima and the World Bank, which would intervene in the quadrant between shreds Santa Rosa, El Carmen, José Manuel Iturregui and República de Panamá and Andrés Avelino Cáceres avenues, with the aim of recovering public spaces and promoting sustainable mobility.

The areas of Barrio Médico (adjacent to the district of Miraflores) and Limatambo (adjacent to the districts of San Isidro and Miraflores), consist of parks, spacious houses and modern buildings inhabited by people of high socioeconomic level, with a better economic situation than the neighbors from other areas of the district. This point being the most modern part of the district. Likewise, their housing complexes were generally designed for single people or newly married couples, for the minimum amount of square meters. In the Limatambo urbanization, for almost 20 years, the homes located in said place have begun to sink due to the unstable terrain. This happens because the buildings were built on the land of an old quarry, which was filled with sanitary and construction waste, the latter when the Vía Expresa Paseo de la República was built. The land was sold to former employees of the Banco de la Vivienda (Housing Bank), who built in the area without carrying out any study on the soil in the area.

Likewise, there is the triangular area adjacent to the districts of San Borja, Santiago de Surco and Miraflores, which is also a residential area of high socioeconomic level, where its distribution somewhat resembles its bordering districts. This area has as its main arteries Angamos Este, Tomás Marsano, Aviación, Principal and Manuel Villarán avenues, its main urbanizations being La Calera de la Merced, El Pedregal, Los Sauces and Vipep, occupying the southern part of the district. In addition, there are businesses located along Manuel Villarán, Angamos and Aviación avenues, being located in commercial areas.

==== Main buildings ====
Surquillo has 3 model markets (of which Market N° 1 stands out for its gastronomic variety), a cemetery, a youth building, 35 parks and a municipal stadium. Its main Catholic temples are San Vicente de Paul, Jesús Obrero, Nuestra Señora de la Evangelización and Santa María de Nazareth.

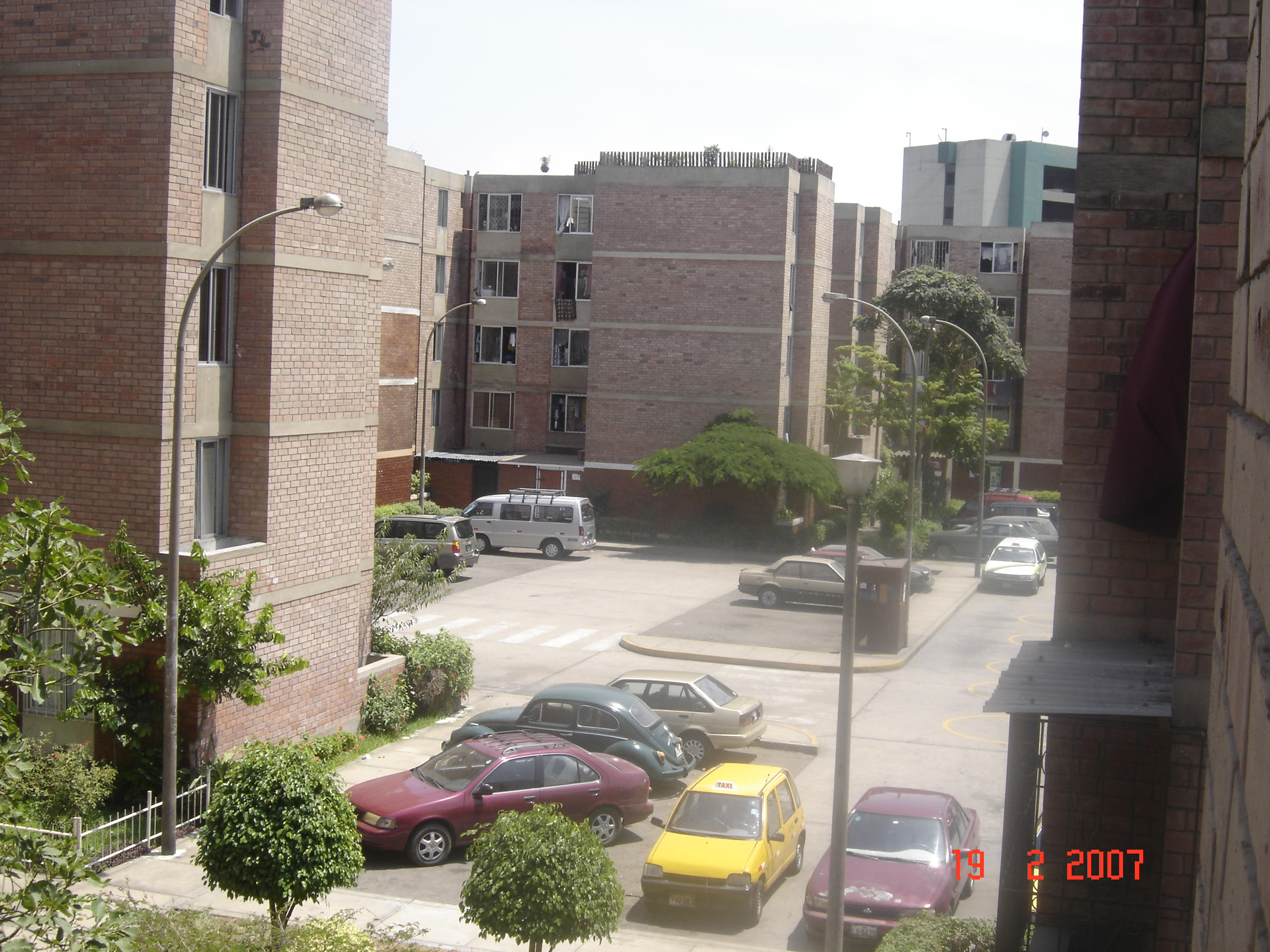
Alfredo Dammert Muelle residential complex, built during the second government of President Fernando Belaúnde Terry.

In 1984, the Alfredo Dammert Muelle housing complex was built by ENACE (National Building Company) and promoted by the government of Fernando Belaúnde Terry, where the depot of the Lima tram network was located until its disappearance in 1965. and from which part of the old Convent of La Merced was built.

==== Main facilities ====
The district is home to the main headquarters of Mibanco, a Telefónica headquarters, the National Geographic Institute of Peru (IGN), the headquarters of OSITRAN, the National Institute of Neoplastic Diseases and the Faculty of Communication Sciences, Tourism and Psychology of the University of San Martín de Porres, as well as the new campus under construction of the Scientific University of the South.

Likewise, in the 20th century, there have been plants and factories for soft drinks, textiles, etc. Today, there are hardware stores, supermarkets and extensive shopping centers.

==== Places of interest ====
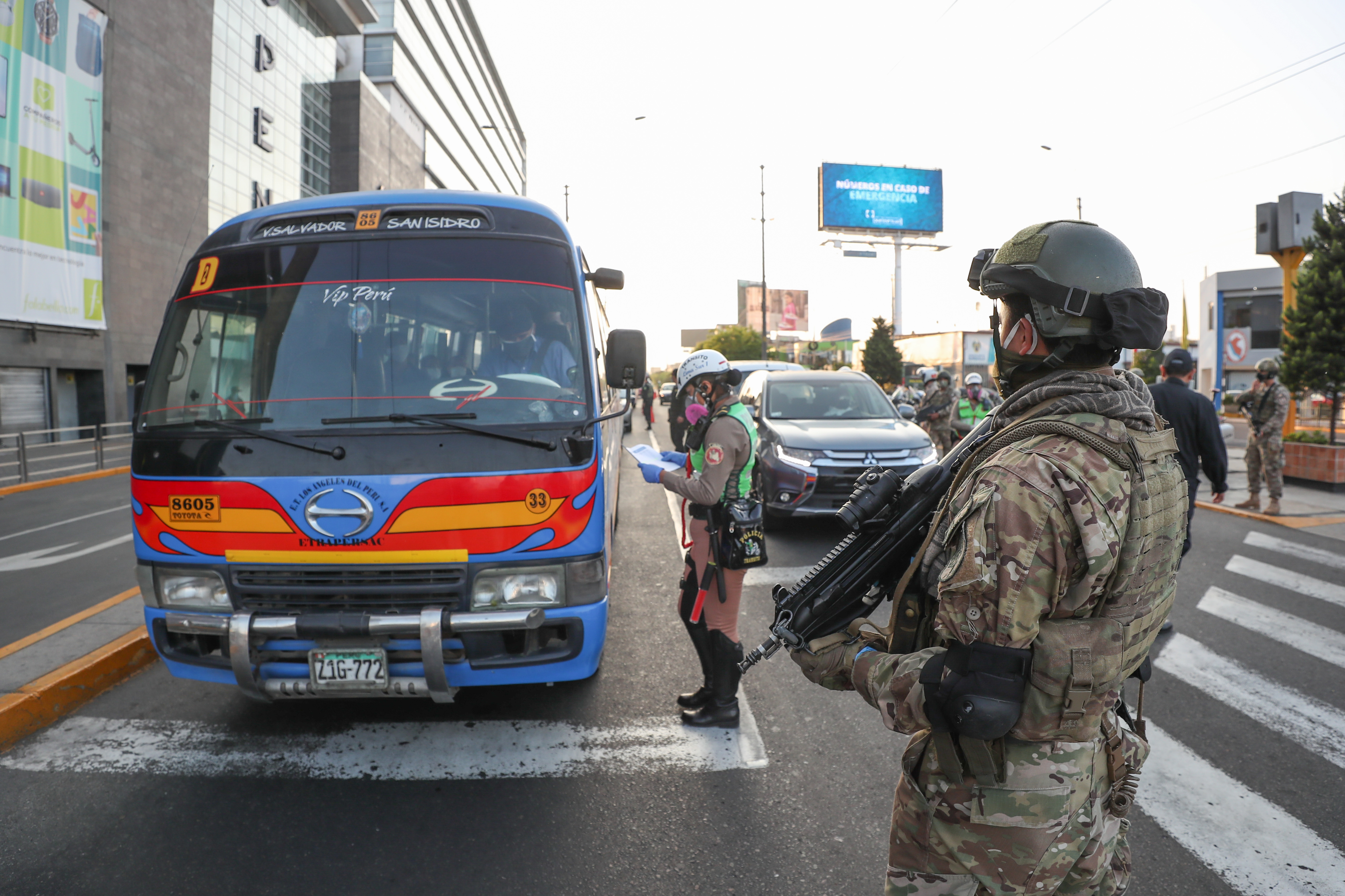
Open Plaza Angamos on the left side.

In Surquillo there are several places of interest, of which the following stand out:

- Parque Reducto No. 5
- Héroes de la Paz Park
- Open Plaza Angamos [es]
- Mercado N° 1 de Surquillo
- Huaca La Merced [es]

==== Real estate boom ====
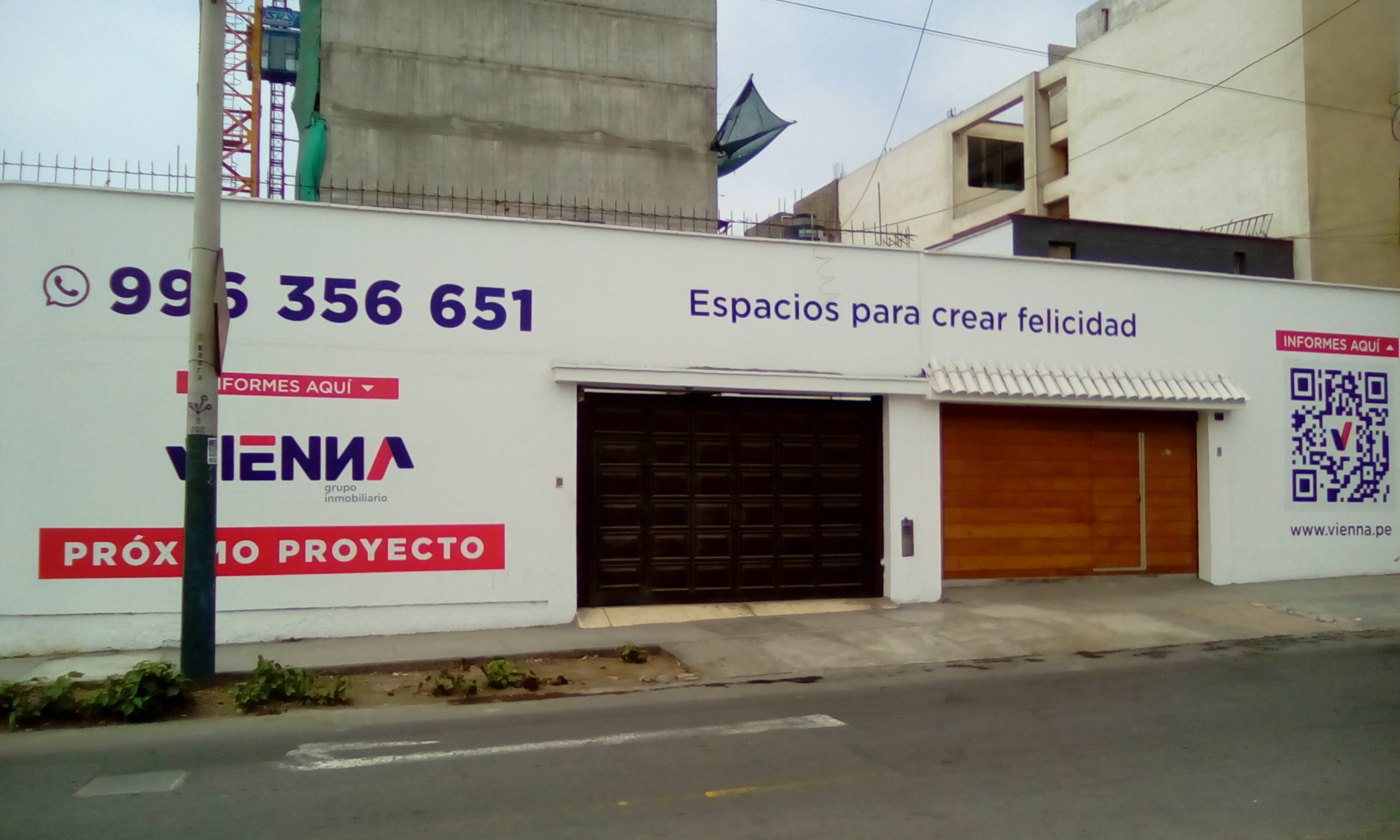
Real estate project on Tomás Marsano Avenue on late-2023.

Since the beginning of the 2000s and the beginning of the 2010s, and to a greater extent today, there has been a considerable real estate boom within Surquillo, in which many residential real estate companies have invested in new residential building projects in several points of the district due to the modification of the urban and building parameters in the district. For this reason, many high-altitude residential buildings have been built in different points such as the areas adjacent to Principal and Andrés Aramburú avenues, as well as parts of urbanizations such as La Calera, Barrio Médico, Los Sauces, and recently along the route of Tomás Marsano Avenue on the border with the Miraflores district and sections of Angamos Avenue. This also brought about the appreciation of house prices in various parts of the district.

== See also ==
- Administrative divisions of Peru
- Lima metropolitan area
