= Angamos Avenue =

Streets in Lima, Peru

Avenida Angamos Avenida Primavera
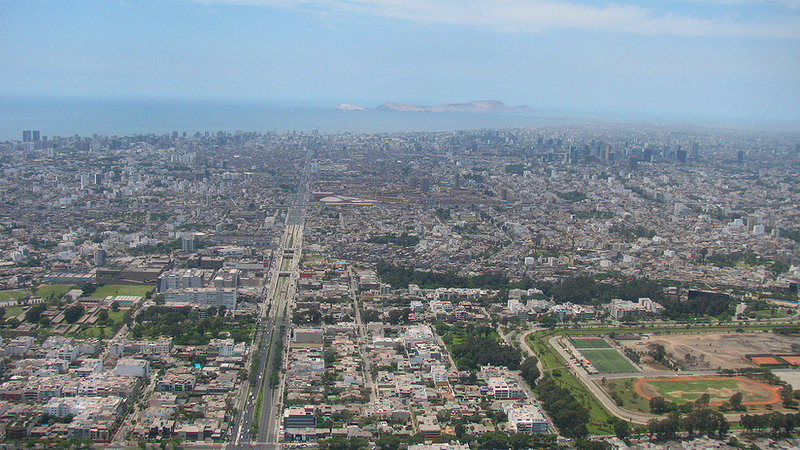
- Aerial view
- Namesake: Battle of Angamos
- From: Parque Mora (Angamos); Avenida San Luis (Primavera)
- Major junctions: Angamos: Avenida Santa Cruz; Avenida Comandante Espinar; Avenida Arequipa; Avenida Petit Thouars; Paseo de la República; Avenida República de Panamá; Avenida Tomás Marsano; Avenida José Gálvez Barrenechea; Avenida Principal; Avenida Aviación; Primavera: Avenida Intihuatana; Avenida San Luis; Avenida Caminos del Inca; Avenida de la Floresta; Avenida Alejandro Velasco Astete; Avenida Buena Vista; Avenida de los Precursores; Puente Primavera; Avenida La Encalada
- To: Avenida San Luis (Angamos); Club Árabe Palestino (Primavera)

Construction
- Completion: 20th century

Angamos Avenue (Spanish: Avenida Angamos) (Note: Angamos is divided into two parts by Arequipa Avenue: Angamos Oeste and Angamos Este. The latter was formerly part of Avenida Primavera.) is a major avenue of Lima, Peru. It changes its name to Primavera Avenue (Spanish: Avenida Primavera) after it crosses San Luis Avenue.

Angamos Avenue extends from west to east in the districts of San Isidro, Miraflores, Surquillo and San Borja along 45 blocks, starting at Mora Park until it reaches San Luis Avenue. (Note: Angamos Este is numbered at 27 blocks in total, while Angamos Oeste is numbered at 18.) Primavera Avenue passes through San Borja and Santiago de Surco's Chacarilla del Estanque neighbourhood, and continues into Monterrico.

== Name ==
Angamos Avenue is named after the Battle of Angamos, which took place during the War of the Pacific. The name changes to Primavera when it crosses San Luis Avenue.

== History ==
The avenue was built during the 20th century over an area consisting mostly of agricultural land. Construction of a section during the mid-20th century partially destroyed one of the fortified constructions built during the War of the Pacific.

== Route ==
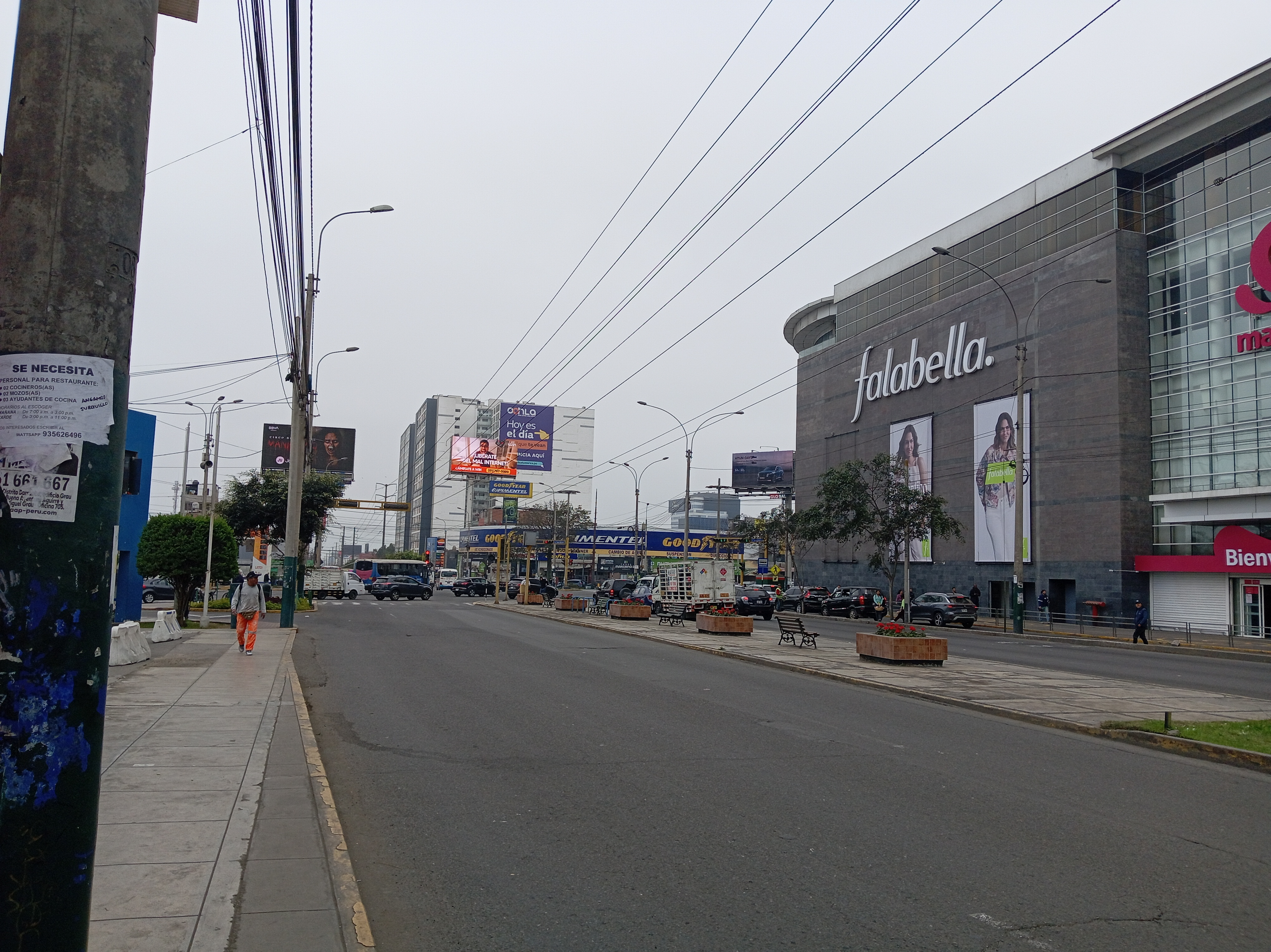
View of the avenue in Surquillo.

=== Angamos Avenue ===
Angamos Oeste begins at Arequipa Avenue, where two cultural heritage monuments are located. The first is the Casa Talleri-Barúa, designed and built in 1938 by Eduardo Elejalde Chopitea, who was commissioned by Graciela Barúa Ganoza. The house was acquired by the Peruvian North American Cultural Institute (ICPNA) in 1963, which was followed by minor modifications and the incorporation of the historic building into a newer construction. To its south is the Casa Isola-Cambana, finished in April 1936 by Jimeno Hermanos & Compañía, a commission by married couple Armando Castañeda and Pauline Rachitoff. The house was later acquired by married couple Eugenio Isola Petitjean and María Estela Cambana, who had previously resided in Azángaro Street. Further to the west are the Belgian embassy, which resides in a 20th-century palace; and the Clínica Delgado, a clinic dating back to 1928 and rebuilt completely in 2014. Near its intersection with Santa Cruz Avenue are the Colegio Inmaculado Corazón, a Catholic school built in the 1940s, and an association of the former Civil Guard. The avenue ends at Contralmirante Ernesto de Mora Park.

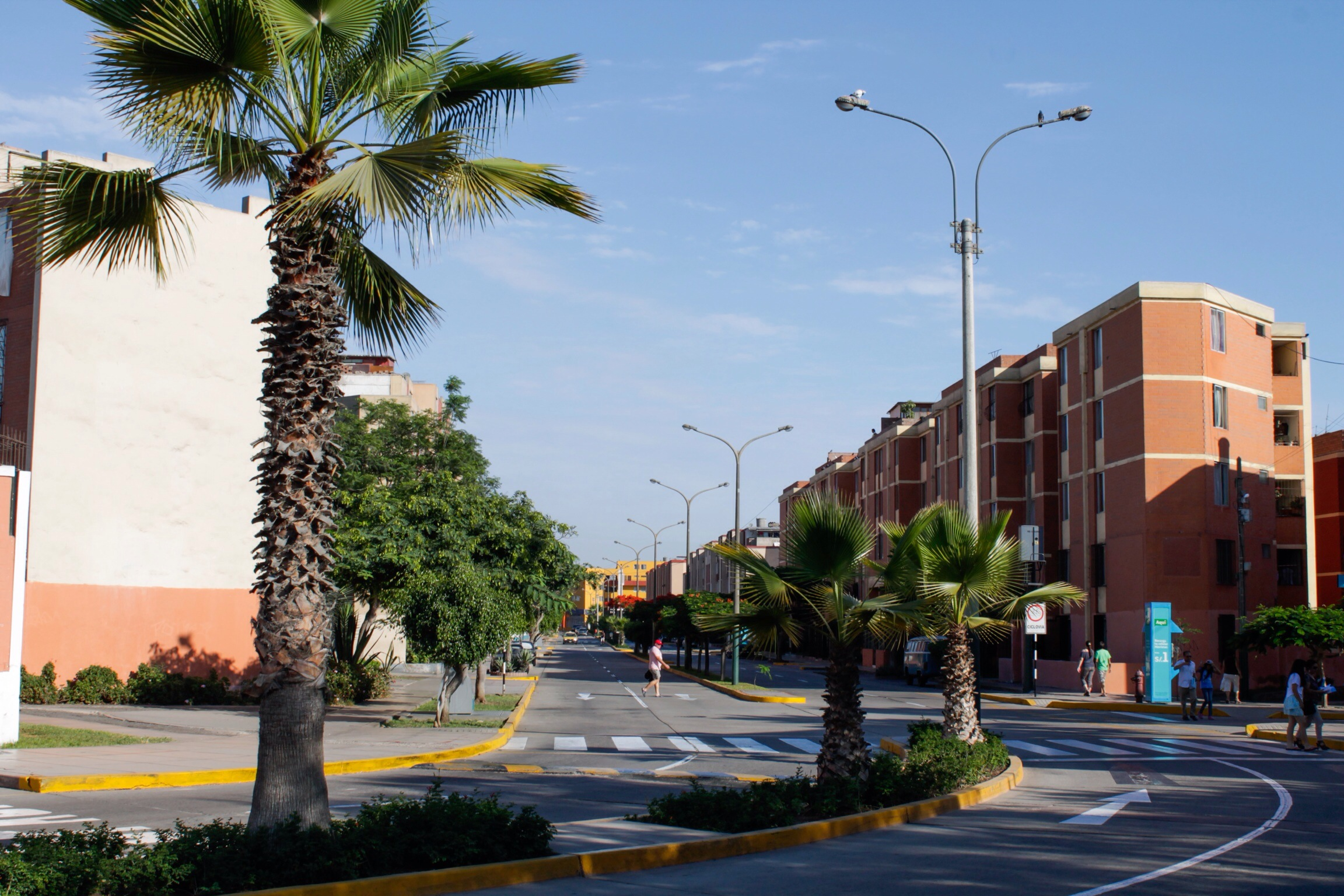
Street in Torres de Limatambo.

Angamos Este (formerly Primavera and Tomás Marsano) also begins at Arequipa Avenue. Its third and fourth blocks are separated by Paseo de la República Avenue, which also separates Miraflores and Surquillo. Further to the east is Parque Reducto No. 5, a redoubt built to unsuccessfully defend the city from the Chilean Army during the War of the Pacific which was partially destroyed when the avenue was first built during the mid-20th century. To its north is a neighbourhood known as the Torres de Limatambo, originally a housing project promoted by architect Fernando Belaúnde during his second presidency. The Real Plaza Primavera (formerly Primavera Park Plaza) and Coliseo Eduardo Dibós are part of this neighbourhood. The avenue changes its name to Primavera shortly after passing through Juan XXIII neighbourhood, the National Institute of Neoplastic Diseases and a Luz del Sur power station. Its northwest corner was the site of Toyota Hearne, a defunct Toyota car dealership owned by Argentine racing driver Thomas Eduardo Hearne, whose terrain was eventually replaced by the Torre Tale Primavera skyscraper.

=== Primavera Avenue ===
The avenue begins at San Luis Avenue. Its first blocks pass through Chacarilla del Estanque, an upper-class neighbourhood shared by San Borja and Surco districts. This part of the avenue hosts a number of residences, businesses and restaurants. It passes under Primavera Bridge and continues into Monterrico, where a campus of the Peruvian University of Applied Sciences is located. The avenue is cut off by José Nicolás Rodrigo Street, where the Club Árabe Palestino is located, as is a park of the same name.

== Transport ==
The street is divided into four to nine lanes, depending on its location. Angamos is one of city's avenues with the most vehicular traffic.

=== Bus service ===
The Metropolitano, the city's bus service, operates a station (Estación Angamos) at the avenue's intersection with Paseo de la República Avenue.

=== Metro service ===
The Lima and Callao Metro operates a station (Estación Angamos) of its Line 1 at the avenue's intersection with Avenida Aviación. It was opened on 11 July 2011 as part of the extension of the line from Atocongo to Miguel Grau. The full revenue service started on 3 January 2012.

== See also ==
- Avenida Arequipa
