= Pan American-Grace Airways =

American airline in South America (1928–1967)

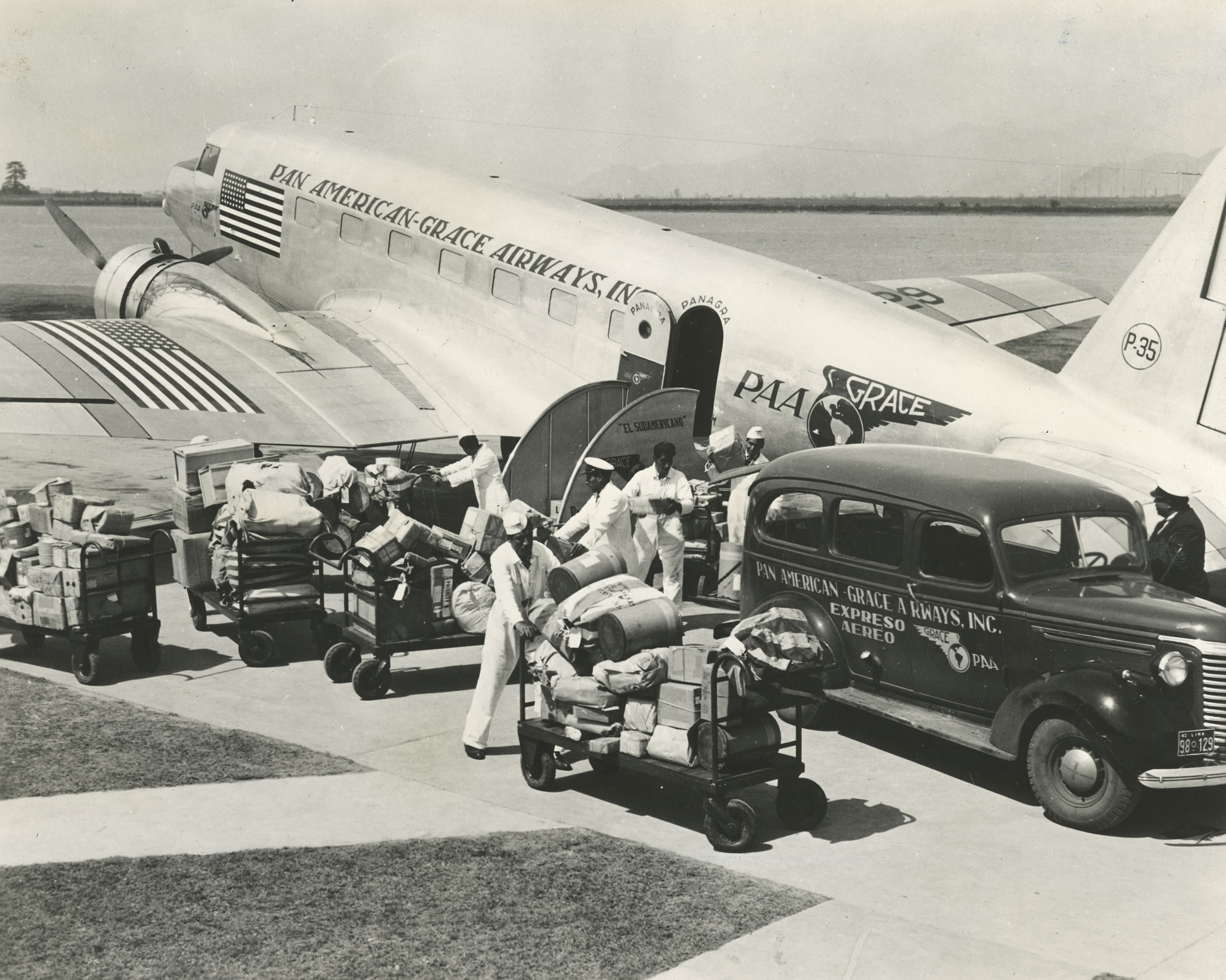
- Pan American-Grace Airways Douglas DC-2
IATA	ICAO	Call sign
PG^{(1)}	PG^{(1)}	Panagra
- Founded: September 1928
- Commenced operations: September 12, 1928
- Ceased operations: February 1, 1967 (merged with Braniff International Airways)
- Hubs: Panama City–Tocumen; Lima–Limatambo (before 1960); Lima–Callao (1960–1967)
- Secondary hubs: Buenos Aires–Ezeiza; Miami; New York–JFK; Rio de Janeiro–Galeão; Viracopos
- Fleet size: See Fleet below
- Destinations: See Destinations below
- Parent company: Pan American World Airways; W. R. Grace and Company
- Headquarters: New York City, New York, United States
- Key people: Harold J. Roig; Andrew B. Shea; Richard B. Cass

Notes
- (1) IATA, ICAO codes were the same until the 1980s

Pan American-Grace Airways, also known as Panagra, and dubbed "The World's Friendliest Airline" was an airline formed as a joint venture between Pan American World Airways and Grace Shipping Company. On September 13, 1928, a small single-engine Fairchild airliner flew from Lima, Peru, to Talara, Peru, which marked not only the beginning of Pan American Grace Airways but also the inauguration of scheduled air transportation along the West Coast of South America. From this short flight in 1928 to nonstop flights from New York to South America with Douglas DC-8 Intercontinental Jets in 1966, Panagra became the standard-bearer for transportation between the US Mainland East Coast and the West Coast of South America for 39 years. The company merged with Braniff International Airways in 1967, and the combined carrier became the largest US airline serving South America.

== Formation of Pan American Grace Airways ==
In June 1928, Pan American Airways Corporation, originally known as Aviation Corporation of the Americas, was formed to obtain the necessary capital to enable its operating subsidiary, Pan American, to bid for various foreign airmail contracts to Latin America. These contracts were soon to be announced by the US Postmaster General pursuant to the Foreign Air Mail Act of 1928 and Pan American believed that it would be ultimately conducting operations under any contracts that might be awarded.

Pan American was correct and during May and July 1928, the new company had three foreign airmail contracts bestowed for service to Latin America. Specifically, Pan American was awarded the contract for Foreign Air Mail Route (FAM) No. 5 for service between Miami and Panama in the Canal Zone. Interestingly, Pan American had already strategically decided that if it received FAM 5 then it would ask for extension services beyond the Canal Zone to and along the western coast of South America. The New York-based airline had also promulgated operating rights into Colombia, Panama, Ecuador and Peru, and had also purchase sufficient aircraft to operate the route system.

Aviation Corporation of America's operating subsidiary, Pan American World Airways, operated only twelve aircraft with 100 employees, while AVCO's entire capitalization was only US$3,775,000, at the end of 1928. The developments of 1928 introduced the auspices for the formation of a new company formed under the laws of Delaware. Pan American entered into an agreement with W. R. Grace and Company to operate airline operations into Peru, which was outlined in two letters of intent dated August 31, 1928, and September 7, 1928. Under this agreement, both companies subscribed to US$25000 of new capital stock in the new Panagra company, which would jointly study the possibility of operating air carrier and mail services between the Canal Zone and Valparaiso, Chile. If AVCO were to determine that it would be beneficial to bid on a mail contract for this type of service then W. R. Grace's initial contribution would be treated as stock in the new company giving W. R. Grace the option to obtain an interest in the new venture not to exceed 50 percent of its capitalization.

Also, the agreement stated that Pan American would have full responsibility for the operation of the air carrier services, while W. R. Grace operations in cities along the proposed new route would act as agents for the new company, which was incorporated as Peruvian Airways Corporation. In September 1928, both companies contributed US$25,000 in capital to Peruvian Airways, forming a 50/50 partnership. On January 31, 1929, the US Postmaster General issued need for a contract for Foreign Air Mail Route No. 9, which would extend from Panama extending down the west coast of South America to Santiago, Chile, with an option for the Postmaster General to offer extension services from Santiago across the lower belt of the Andes Mountains to Buenos Aires, Argentina, and beyond to Montevideo, Uruguay.

On February 21, 1929, Pan American World Airways and W. R. Grace and Company, the parent company to Grace Shipping at that time, announced the formation of Pan American Grace Airways, Inc., to bid on the new airmail contract. The new company bid on the contract and both partners subscribed US$500,000 each to the capitalization of the new Pan American Grace company, which also included the original amounts subscribed to the original operating entity, Peruvian Airways Corporation.

== First scheduled services ==
Pan American and W. R. Grace's new operating entity, Peruvian Airways Corporation, purchased its first aircraft on August 1, 1928. The new airliner, a Fairchild P-1 monoplane, featured a cabin for four passengers and was powered by a Wright Whirlwind engine with an output of 220 horsepower (164 kilowatts). Five weeks later on September 13, 1928, the new Fairchild P-1 inaugurated the first scheduled commercial flight along the West Coast of South America, with a nonstop flight from Lima, Peru, to Talara, Peru, carrying both passengers and mail.

The little Fairchild carried just a few letters and a full load of four passengers on the inaugural flight, which departed from a racetrack in Lima. Upon arrival in Talara, the legend-making airliner landed at an "airport" in Talara that was a soccer field. In spite of these drawbacks, Pan American Grace Airways first flight had been successfully completed without incident.

== Award of first Foreign Air Mail contract ==
Armed with a new Foreign Air Mail Act of March 2, 1929, which modified the 1928 Act by allowing the US Postmaster General to pay air carriers for transportation from foreign countries to the United States in addition to the outbound direction and the Postmaster-General could further amend Foreign Air Mail contracts issued via the Act of 1928 with the same new provisions. On the same date, the Postmaster General awarded Pan American Grace with Foreign Air Mail Contract No. 9.

Several other carriers had also bid on the new Route 9 and several had bid lower than Panagra. However, the Postmaster General noted that it was his discretion as to which carrier was ultimately selected. The Postmaster General stated that Pan American's experience in the region put it well ahead of the other bidders and was therefore the lowest "responsible bidder" that could satisfactorily serve the needs of the government. It was found by the Postmaster-General that Pan American had spent two years in preparing for the new route down the west coast of South America and the company's successful operation of service in the Caribbean as well as the significance of the infrastructure already in place along the proposed routes along the West Coast that were in operation and in place by W. R. Grace and finally the financial abilities of Pan American and W. R. Grace played an additional significant role in the award.

== Inauguration of FAM Route 9 ==
On July 12, 1929, Pan American Grace inaugurated its first service over FAM Route 9. However, until the end of 1929, Pan American operated the route as far south as Guayaquil, Ecuador, which included the use of PAA aircraft and personnel.

== First across the Andes ==
On October 12, 1929, only 13 months after its first history-making first flight, Panagra inaugurated successful commercial flight across the Andes Mountains. Pan American Grace's Ford Trimotor airliner departed Buenos Aires, Argentina, and headed toward Chile. The venerable Ford flew over the flat pampas and then landed at Mendoza, Argentina, where it refueled and prepared for the next leg of the trip.

Back in the air, the Trimotor crossed the Cordillera of the Andes and then through Uspallata Pass where it crossed at an unheard of altitude of 18,000 feet (5,490 meters). Having left the Argentine capital city eight and one-half hours earlier, the aircraft landed at Santiago's Los Cerrillos Airport.

== The Magna Carta of Aviation ==
Route network at the time the Civil Aeronautics Board certificated Pan American-Grace Airways in July 1940

Braniff Airways Cofounder and President Thomas Elmer Braniff called the Civil Aeronautics Act of 1938, the "Magna Carta of Aviation" because it revolutionized the entire industry into a cohesive whole that gave prominence to the air carriers in the United States. The Act, signed into law on June 23, 1938, transferred the responsibility of non-military aviation from the Bureau of Air Commerce to the newly formed Civil Aeronautics Agency to oversee the operation of all of the nation's airlines including for economic reasons as well as safety needs and requirements. Airlines were now required to be issued a Certificate of Public Convenience and Necessity to prove that their service was viable to the nation's air travel needs.

Upon enactment of the Act, it was immediately recommended that Pan American and Pan American Grace Airways be issued this certificate. Both carriers now operated a "circle" of service all the way around South America and their viability was more crucial than ever before. Pan American noted that the two carrier's services were meant to be complementary rather than competitive and in nearly every instance they were. Specifically, a large percentage of Pan American's traffic carried from the Canal Zone to the United States Mainland was as a result of flow-thru traffic from Pan American Grace destinations along the West Coast of South America to the Canal Zone and the same for Pan American Grace from Pan American's southbound operations to the Canal Zone. Pan American-Grace received its certificate on 22 July 1940, backdated to 22 August 1938.

== Flying from the United States to Buenos Aires in 1939 ==
Panagra's network stretched from Panama and the U.S.-controlled Panama Canal Zone to Santiago in Chile and Buenos Aires. It was founded in 1929 to compete with SCADTA, a German-owned company, and held a quasi-monopoly over air travel in parts of Colombia and South America during the 1940s and 1950s.

In 1939, a passenger traveling from the United States to Buenos Aires would board a Pan Am Sikorsky S-42 flying boat at Miami and fly to Colon in the Canal Zone, stay overnight, and then board a Panagra Douglas DC-2 or DC-3 and fly to Buenos Aires, with overnight stops in Guayaquil, Arica, and Santiago. This route was a full day faster than the Pan Am service operated via the coast of Brazil. The one-way fare from Miami to Buenos Aires was US$550 (equivalent to $13,772 in 2025). After World War II, airliners could operate at night over South America, and in 1947 Panagra Douglas DC-6s made scheduled flights from Miami to Buenos Aires in 20 hours and 25 minutes.

Pan Am crewed the DC-6s south across the Caribbean to Albrook Field near Balboa in the Canal Zone, where Panagra flight crews took over. In 1949, Panagra flights serving Panama shifted to Tocumen Airport. In 1955, Panagra Douglas DC-6Bs and DC-7Bs began serving Washington, D.C., and New York City, with these flights operated by National Airlines crews north of Miami. In 1957, the Panagra DC-7B service via Lima was several hours faster from New York Idlewild Airport (later renamed John F. Kennedy International Airport) to Buenos Aires than the Pan Am DC-7B service operated via Rio de Janeiro.

== Creating the Pan American-Grace juggernaut ==
Invariably, the admitted complementary services of Pan American and Pan American-Grace would begin to create situations that were on the verge of triggering anti-trust violations. It was the late 1940s, and a series of agreements between Pan American and Panagra set in motion a battle that would not end until Pan American-Grace merged with Braniff Airways in February 1967. In 1946, Pan American proposed to the Civil Aeronautics Board (formed in 1940 to take over airline economic and route cases) that certain Pan American-Grace aircraft would be chartered to Pan American Airways and operated by Pan American Airways over certain routes north of the Panama Canal Zone, and more specifically between there and the Miami, Florida, gateway. What this created was a convenient through-plane service for passengers traveling between Pan American and Panagra routes.

This agreement, known as the Through-Flight Agreement was approved by the CAB in 1947. Another key part of this agreement also provided for the eventual extension of this agreement beyond Miami to New York City should Pan American ever be approved to operate this particular route segment. Accordingly, in 1949, Pan American and Panagra entered into an agreement with Miami-based National Airlines, Inc., which enabled Pan American Grace Airways aircraft to be chartered to National for operation over its route between Miami and New York, thereby creating single-plane service from Buenos Aires to New York. National Airlines decided to leave the agreement in 1950 and PAA and Panagra then entered into a similar agreement with Miami-based Eastern Airlines over the same Miami-New York route. It was placed before the CAB in 1951 but ultimately, an interchange service agreement (see Transport hub) was awarded to Eastern and Braniff for through-flights between New York and South America.

== The Panagra road to Braniff Airways ==
Panagra had been Braniff's chief competitor along the South American West Coast since Braniff began serving the region in June 1948. Panagra's history dated back to 1928, the same year that Braniff was first founded. The Airline was formed by the merger of Peruvian Airways and Chilean Airways. The new company, Pan American Grace Airways, Inc., was jointly and equally owned by both Pan American World Airways, Inc., and W. R. Grace and Company, the largest shipping company in South America.

As early as 1953, the Civil Aeronautics Board had recommended that Pan Am divest itself of Panagra, because of Pan Am's decades-long control of air travel in the region and between US and Latin America. After years of failed negotiations between the two carriers, the mandate was finally fulfilled. Braniff President Charles Edmund Beard had negotiated an earlier agreement for Braniff to buy Panagra for US$22 million in 1964. Arrangements were made for Braniff to buy W. R. Grace's half of Panagra for US$11 million with negotiations to continue into early 1965, for the purchase of Pan Am's half of Panagra. A projected merger date was to have been late summer 1965 but Pan American's legendary Founder and President Juan Terry Trippe did not accept Braniff's offer. With the overhaul of Braniff's management team in April 1965, the merger was further delayed until additional evaluation could be completed by the new management group.

Pan Am had been under pressure from the Civil Aeronautics Board, which had requested that the Justice Department file charges against Pan Am, to remedy antitrust problems that the carrier had become involved in by limiting the northward expansion of Panagra. Panagra only operated as far north as Panama and extended south along the West Coast of South America to cities such as Cali, Colombia, Quito and Guayaquil, Ecuador, Lima, Peru, La Paz, Bolivia, Antofagasta and Santiago, Chile and Buenos Aires, Argentina. Pan Am operated scheduled passenger flights north from Panama to Miami.

A New York Federal Court ruled that Pan Am was in violation of the Sherman Antitrust Act by its actions in regard to limiting Panagra's Northern expansion. The New York Court found that Panagra was not in violation of the antitrust act but that Pan Am was in violation and should divest itself of Panagra stock and its ownership. In 1963, the case was sent to the Supreme Court who ruled that the case fell under the jurisdiction of the CAB.

In December 1965, Braniff International successfully negotiated the purchase of W. R. Grace and Company's 50-percent share in Panagra for US$15 million. Three months later on March 17, 1966, Braniff further completed an agreement to purchase Pan American World Airways's 50-percent share in Panagra for the same amount. The plan was forwarded to the Civil Aeronautics Board who approved the merger agreement in July 1966.

== Panagra merges with Braniff International ==
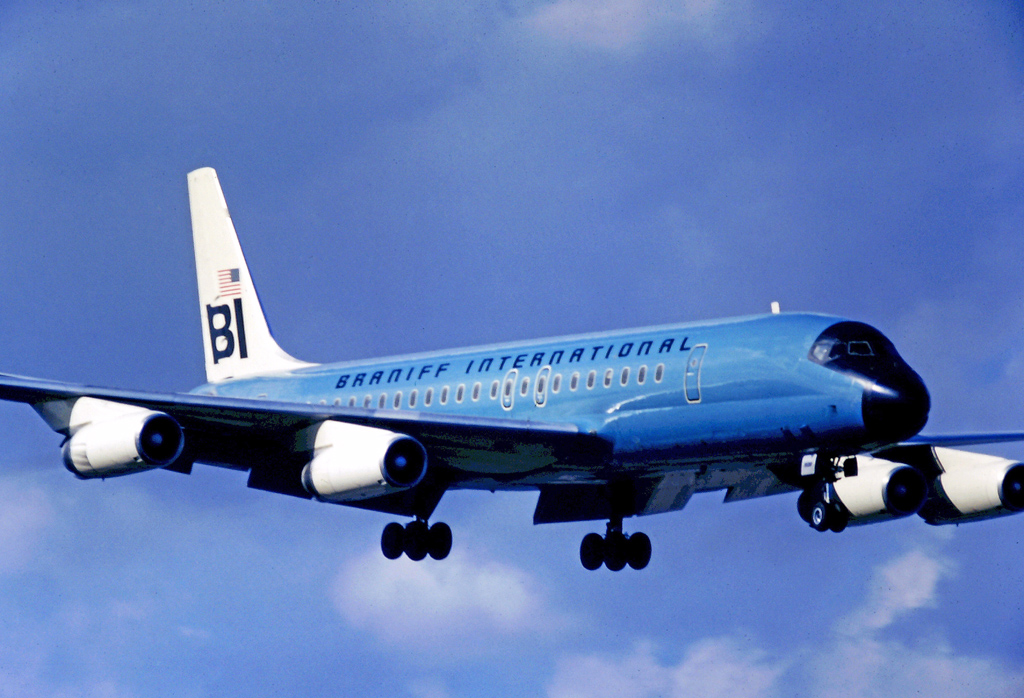
McDonnell Douglas DC-8-62 of Braniff International Airways landing in 1971

On February 1, 1967, Braniff International merged with Pan American Grace Airways, also known by the trade name Panagra. Braniff purchased the 39-year-old South American West Coast airline for US$30 million from its two owners, W. R. Grace and Company and Pan American World Airways, Inc.. Braniff Executive Vice President Charles Edward Acker presented a check for US$15 million to W. R. Grace and Company Assistant General Council Walter Morris a month earlier in January 1967, which signaled the historic finalization of the merger between the two carriers. Earlier, Braniff had presented a check for US$15 million to Pan American World Airways for their one-half share in Panagra. With the payments in place, the merger was allowed to commence.

Braniff paid a very nominal amount for Panagra, which included a fleet of DC-8-31 jets along with prepaid deposits of $27 million on five ordered DC-8-62s that were delivered to Braniff beginning in the summer of 1967. At the time of the 1964 merger negotiation, Panagra had not ordered the five Super 62 jetliners. The new negotiation figure of US$30 million did include the new jets and their handsome deposits, whereas the 1964 figure of US$22 million included the DC-8-31s and an aging fleet of propeller aircraft.

President Lyndon Baines Johnson approved the merger in October 1966, and on January 19, 1967, Braniff International completed the purchase agreement. The two carriers merged on February 1, 1967, and the combined airline operated 30 flights a week to South America. Braniff also acquired Panagra's interest in the Peruvian airline Faucett.

Braniff Chairman of the Board of Directors Harding L. Lawrence held a press conference in New York City to announce the purchase of Panagra. Lawrence stated:

This is perhaps the most significant development in air transportation between North and South America, since the advent of the jet aircraft.

He further stated, "On February 1, Braniff will merge the Latin American operations of Panagra with Braniff and begin the first combined service under the Braniff International name."

Lawrence emphasized that a quick integration of the two carriers would occur as well as a major reorganization for both companies. Months of intensive planning were completed and in place to begin a smooth transition that would emphasize leadership, the delegation of responsibilities, and effective utilization of the 9,918 combined employees as a result of the merger.

== Service highlights and aircraft from the merger ==
New service that resulted from combining the two carriers featured the first through-flights from San Francisco and Los Angeles to Lima and La Paz and Lima and Santiago that eliminated the need for a change of planes at Panama City. New nonstop service was also inaugurated between Santiago, Chile, and Miami, Florida, for the first time.

Prior to the merger, many of Braniff's and Panagra's flights departed at the same time. They were rescheduled to be equally spaced to provide more fluid and convenient schedules for Braniff passengers. Five US Gateways would also be used for the first time and included New York, Miami, Houston, Los Angeles, and San Francisco, which would allow service to be provided to South America from each major section of the US Mainland.

Braniff acquired seven used aircraft and five new aircraft orders as a result of the merger. The Panagra fleet included two Douglas DC-7Bs, one Douglas DC-8-55F Jet Trader (freighter), which had been leased from Douglas in 1966, four Douglas DC-8-31s, and orders for five Douglas DC-8-62 Intercontinental Jets. The Douglas DC-7Bs were quickly retired with only the four DC-8-31s and one Series 55F aircraft remaining in the Braniff system.

== Repainting the Panagra fleet ==
All five DC-8 aircraft were initially left in the green and yellow Panagra color scheme but black Alexander Girard 'Braniff International' titles were added down both sides of the fuselage replacing the Pan American Grace titles. The Panagra feather logo on the tail was replaced with a large Alexander Girard black BI logo.

After May 1967, four of the DC-8s were painted in the 1967 Alexander Girard/Harper and George 'Solid' color scheme. One was painted in Dark Panagra Green, N1801 in Orange, one was painted in New Dark Blue, and one passenger and the cargo aircraft were painted in Orange. The DC-8-31 aircraft were quickly retired from the Braniff fleet as the new DC-8-62 Intercontinental Jets were delivered in August-December 1967. The Series 62 aircraft were never painted in a proposed Panagra Concept color scheme but were instead delivered in the updated 1967 Harper and George color palette for the Girard Solid Color Scheme. Harper and George used the Panagra DC-8 Concept color scheme green and yellow colors as inspiration for the Panagra Green and Panagra Yellow Solid colors.

== First jet service in South America ==
Panagra entered the jet age in 1960 when it introduced new Douglas DC-8-31 jetliners.

According to the Panagra system timetable dated July 15, 1966, the airline was operating DC-8 "El Inter Americano" jet service between various destinations in Latin America and Los Angeles (Los Angeles International Airport), Miami (MIA), New York City (JFK) and San Francisco (San Francisco International Airport). Panagra was still cooperating with National Airlines and Pan American World Airways with regard to their service between the U.S. and Latin America at this time. This timetable listed the following destinations served by Panagra in Central and South America: Antofagasta, Chile; Buenos Aires, Argentina; Cali, Colombia; Guayaquil, Ecuador; La Paz, Bolivia; Lima, Peru; Panama City, Panama; Quito, Ecuador; and Santiago, Chile.

== Braniff's South America routes after 1983 ==
Braniff operated the former Panagra routes to South America until 1982 when Eastern Air Lines purchased Braniff's South American operations. Beginning in 1990, these routes were then operated by American Airlines which had acquired them from Eastern.

== New Panagra startup ==
The Panagra name was resurrected during the late 1990s when a new airline billed itself as Panagra Airways, operating Boeing 727-200 jetliners.

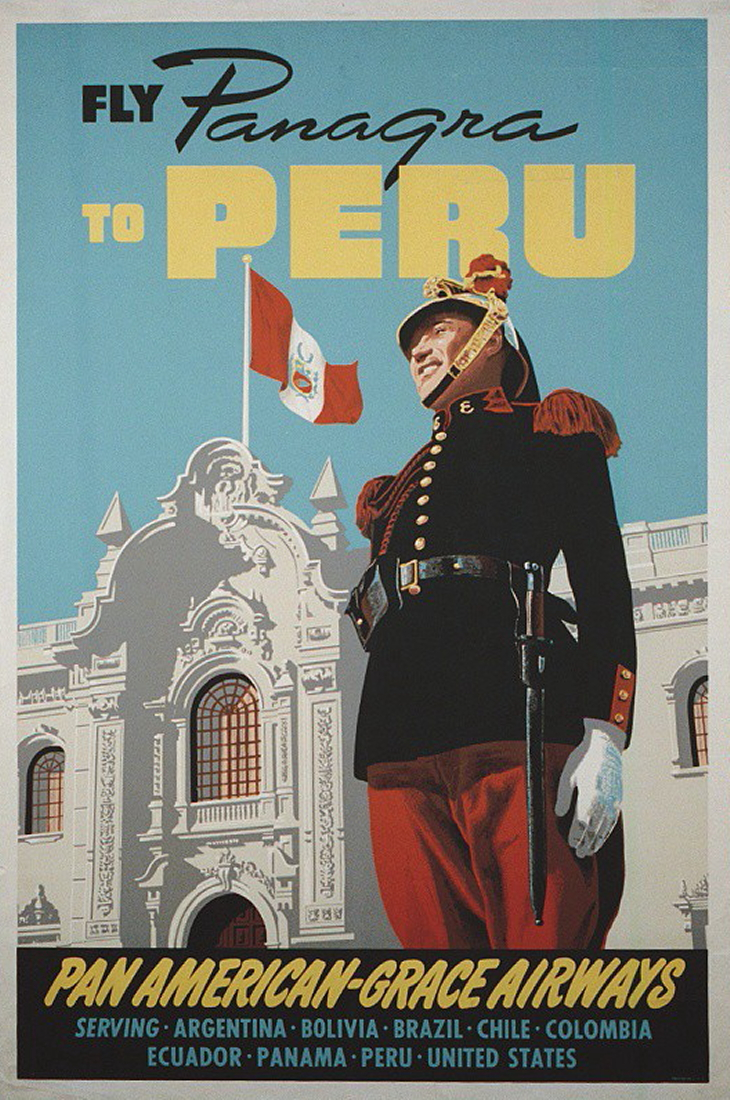
Panagra travel poster for service to Peru

== Pan American Grace Airways intellectual property ==
Pan American Grace Airways' and Panagra's intellectual property is currently owned by Braniff Airways, Inc., and is administered by Braniff Airways Foundation, in Dallas, Texas. All Pan American Grace Airways posters were created by J. W. Thompson Agency at the airline's Lima, Peru, offices. These posters, similar to Braniff's mid-century themed posters, which were also produced in South America, are not in the public domain but have undergone copyright restoration in the United States. The intellectual property rights to these posters are fully owned by Braniff Airways, Inc.

== Accidents ==
February 3, 1931 - Fairchild FC-2 NC8023 - Operating a revenue flight from Buenos Aires, Argentina - The airliner crashed off the coast of Buenos Aires under unknown circumstances and the fate of the crew and passengers is unknown.

February 3, 1931 - Fairchild FC-2W2 NC8026 - Operating a revenue mail flight between Arauca, Colombia and Antofagasta, Chile - The Fairchild crashed into the sea at Piedra de las Montijitas, about 11 km north of Caleta Buena under unknown circumstances. There was a crew of two pilots, Captain C. Thompson and Copilot Luis Morales, and eight mail bags on board. There were no injuries and six of the eight mail bags were recovered along with the aircraft, which was then parked on a nearby pier. However, the aircraft was written off as a total loss.

February 7, 1931 - Sikorsky S-38B NC306N - The flight was operating as a revenue flight to Cristobal, Panama Canal Zone - The Sikorsky amphibian crashed on landing into Bay of Limon at Colon, Panama in the Canal Zone. There were no injuries.

April 1, 1931 - Ford Trimotor NC8418 - Operating a revenue flight to Ovalle, Chile - The aircraft crashed on landing at Ovalle Airport but the circumstances are unknown. All seven persons on board survived but the aircraft was a total loss.

July 16, 1932 - Ford Trimotor NC403H "San Jose" - Flying a revenue flight from Santiago, Chile, to Buenos Aires, Argentina, with an en-route stop at Mendoza, Argentina - The Ford was operating over the Andes Mountains east of Santiago when it encountered a heavy snowstorm and crashed into mountainous terrain near El Plomo. There were no survivors. Initially, the search did not find the accident site and was called off after a few days. However, twenty months later, the aircraft was found by ramblers.

March 11, 1933 - Fairchild FC-2W2 NC9723 - Flying a revenue flight at Mendoza, Argentina - The aircraft crashed under unknown circumstances. There were no casualties.

March 22, 1934 - Ford Trimotor NC407H - Flying a revenue flight from Lima, Peru - The flight departed Lima, Peru, and crashed shortly after departure from the runway due to engine failure. The two pilots and one passenger were killed but the other twelve passengers survived.

June 11, 1934 - Ford Trimotor NC8417 "San Pedro" - Flying a revenue flight from Mar del Plata, Argentina to Buenos Aires, Argentina - Lost at Mar Chiquita Lagoon in Argentina, during a heavy rain storm. Six of the seven persons on board were killed including all three crew members.

May 8, 1935 - Lockheed L-5A Vega NC9424 - Crashed at Lima, Peru - Circumstances of the accident are unknown.

January 22, 1943 - Douglas DC-3A - Flight 9 flying regular schedule between Santiago, Chile and Lima, Peru - One hour after leaving Arequipa Airport and then after 3 PM the crew reported via radio that it was flying over Ocoña River, the DC-3 crashed on the slopes of Guayuri Grande Hill in the province of Caraveli, Department of Arequipa, Peru. Ten passengers and three crew members on board were killed but one passenger survived.

August 23, 1937 - Douglas DC-2-118A NC14298 "Santa Elena" - Operating a revenue flight from Mendoza, Argentina to Cordoba, Argentina - The DC-2 crashed and burned and was a total loss. The accident occurred 20 miles north of San Luis, Argentina. There were the three crew members on board and they were killed in the accident.

June 19, 1938 - Douglas DC-2-118A NC14272 "Santa Lucia" - Flying a revenue flight from Santiago, Chile to Arica, Chile - The aircraft crashed in the Andes Mountains with all four persons on board lost. The aircraft was not found until February 1941 by native Indians.

June 26, 1941 - Sikorsky S-43 NC16928 - Operating a training flight at Rio de Janeiro Santos Dumont Airport - While on a training mission, the flight crashed into Guanabara Bay after the aircraft contacted the water in a nose-down attitude and then overturned and sank. The aircraft was a total loss but all four crew on board survived.

Unknown Date 1942 - Douglas DC-2-118A NC14292 "Santa Silvia" - Operating as a revenue flight between Arequipa, Peru, and Lima, Peru - The DC-2 crashed while en route; all five persons on board survived.

January 22, 1943 - Douglas DC-3A-399 NC33645 - Flying a revenue flight from Santiago, Chile to Arequipa, Peru to Lima, Peru - Fifty minutes after departing Arequipa, the DC-3 crashed into a 13,000-foot mountain peak in the Andes Mountains. The cause was continued flight into instrument conditions, which was against company procedures. There were four crew members that all died in the accident and 14 of the 15 passengers were also lost.

July 31, 1944 - Douglas DC-2-118A NC14268 "Santa Ana" - The DC-2 crashed at Arajuna, Ecuador under unknown circumstances. The number of occupants is unknown or if any were lost in the accident.

January 4, 1945 - Douglas DC-3A NC19470 - Operating an illegal flight from Limatambo Airport, Peru - Two mechanics and two unknown persons boarded the aircraft and departed Lima. The flight crashed 5 miles south of Chorrillos, Peru. All four occupants were killed.

October 29, 1962 - Douglas DC-7B N51702 - Flying a revenue flight from La Paz, Bolivia to Miami, Florida - The DC-7B crashed on takeoff from La Paz El Alto Airport. All 6 crew members and 36 passengers survived the incident but the aircraft was a total loss.

== Destinations ==
=== Argentina ===
- Buenos Aires
- San Salvador de Jujuy
- Rufino
- Junin
- Salta
- Villa Mercedes
- Cordoba
- Mendoza
- Mar del Plata
- Morón

=== Bolivia ===
- La Paz
- Puerto Suarez
- Robore
- San Ignacio de Velasco
- Concepcion
- Santa Cruz
- San Jose de Chiquitos
- Cochabamba
- Villazon
- Uyuni
- Oruro

=== Brazil ===
- Santa Mariana
- Corumba
- Campo Grande
- Moquegua

=== Chile ===
- Santiago
- Arica
- San Gregorio
- Antofagasta
- Ovalle

=== Colombia ===
- Barranquilla
- Cali
- Ipiales
- Tumaco
- Buenaventura, Colombia
- Arauca

=== Ecuador ===
- Guayaquil
- Loja
- Salinas
- Cuenca
- Quito
- Esmeraldas
- Manta
- Cuenca

=== Panama Canal Zone ===
- Balboa
- Panama City
- Cristobal

=== Peru ===
- Lima
- Mollendo
- Talara
- Atico District
- Arequipa
- Chiclayo
- Pimentel
- Piura
- Camana
- Tacna
- Moquegua
- Juliaca
- Cusco
- Huancayo
- Ica

=== United States ===
- Washington, DC
- New York City
- Los Angeles
- Miami
- San Francisco

=== Uruguay ===
- Montevideo

== Fleet ==
=== Sikorsky Aircraft Company ===
- Sikorsky S-38B
- Sikorsky S-43

=== Fairchild Aircraft Company ===
- Fairchild FC-2
- Fairchild 71

=== Ford Motor Company ===
- Ford Tri-Motor 5-AT

=== Lockheed Corporation ===
- Lockheed Vega Model 5

=== Douglas Aircraft Company ===
- Douglas DC-2
- Douglas DC-3
- Douglas DC-4
- Douglas DC-6 and Douglas DC-6B
- Douglas DC-7B
- Douglas DC-8-31 Intercontinental Jet, the only jet aircraft type operated by Panagra

Five Douglas DC-8-62s were ordered by Panagra in 1966 but this order was taken up by Braniff in the summer of 1967

== Gallery ==
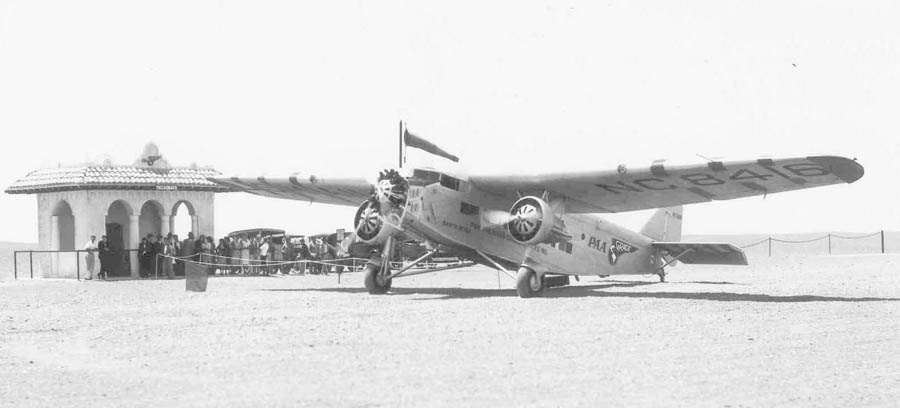
Ford Tri-Motor 5-AT

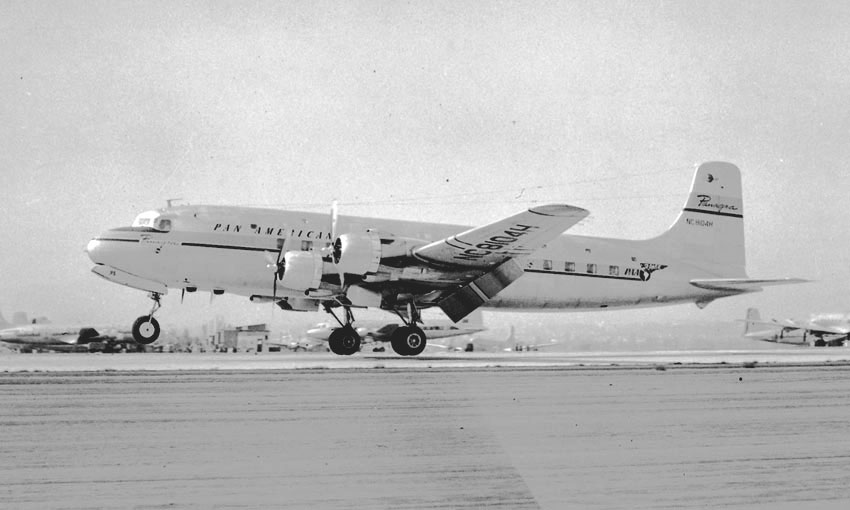
Panagra Douglas DC-6

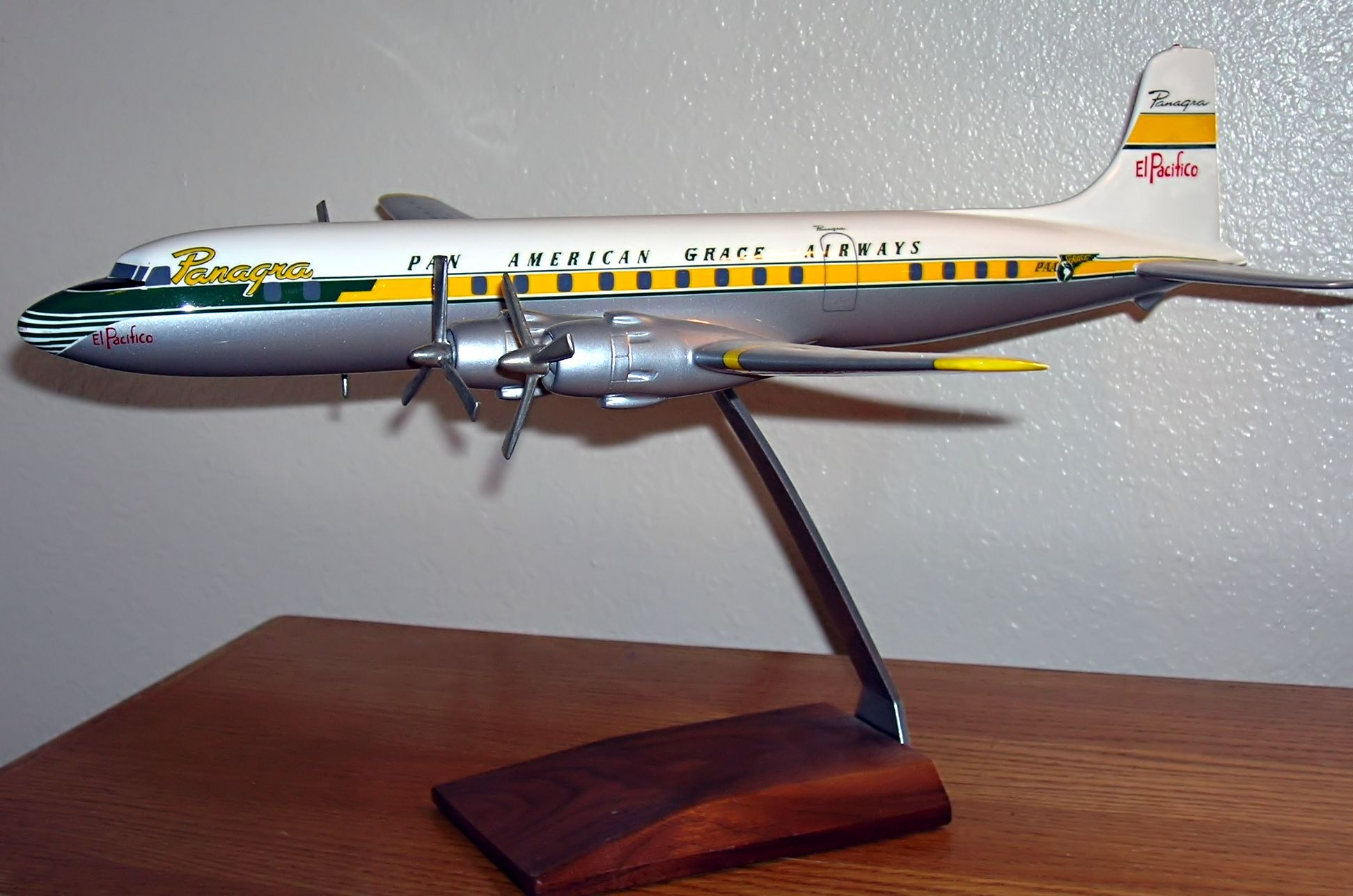
Model of a Douglas DC-6 in Panagra livery

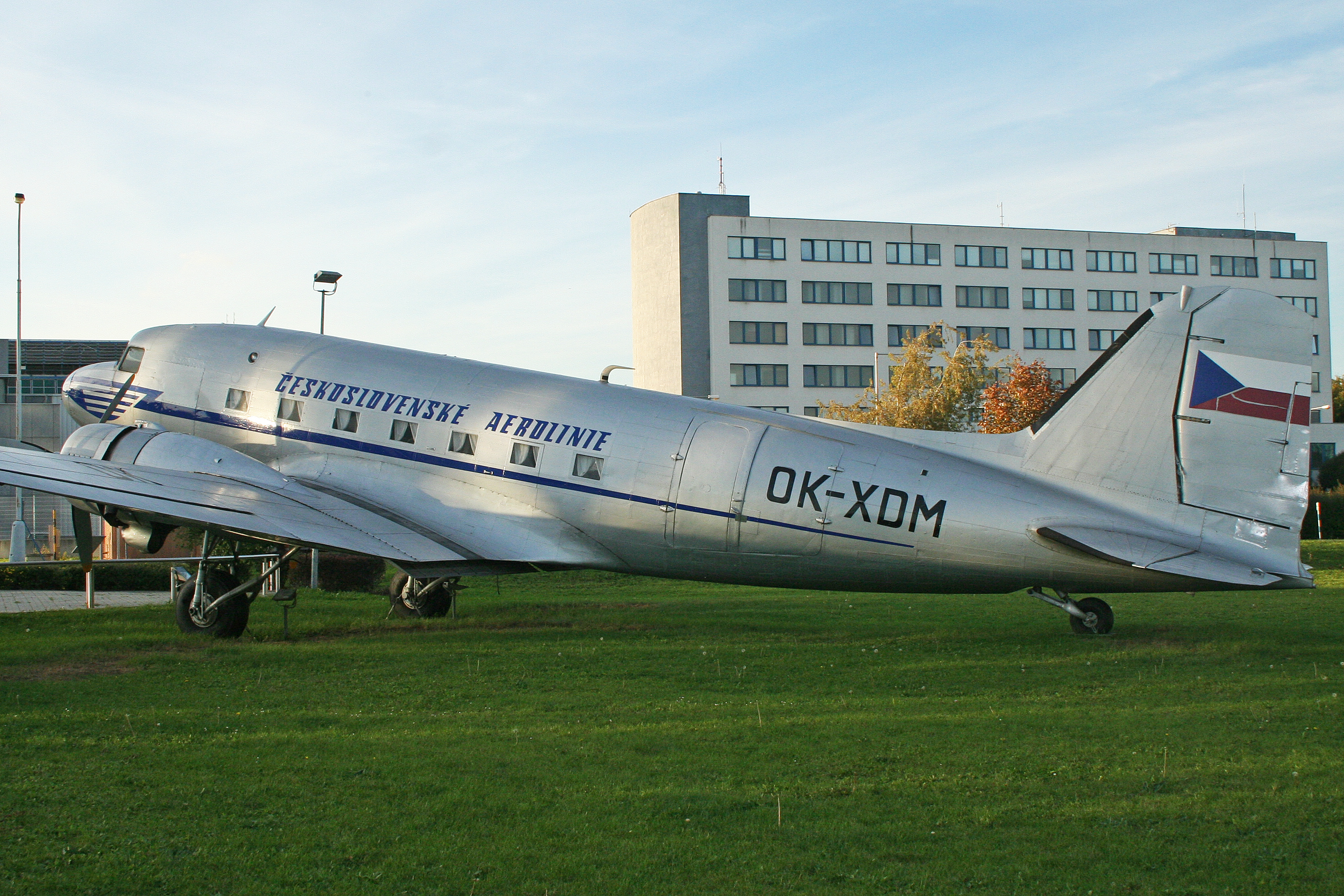
A former Panagra Douglas DC-3 is now at a museum in a period livery of Czech Airlines

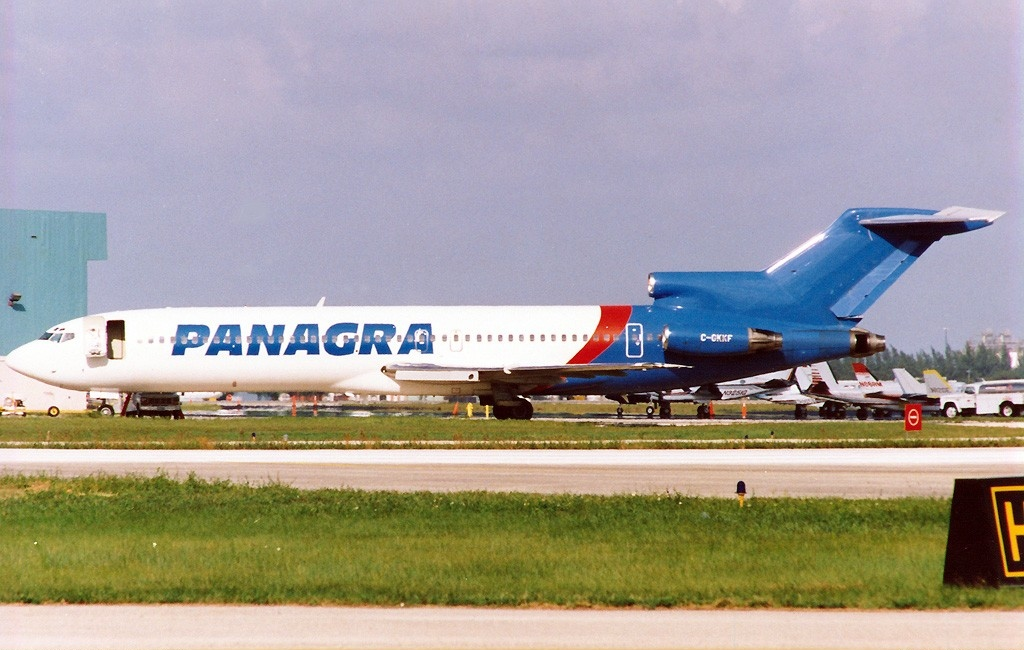
In the late 1990s, the name Panagra was revived as seen on this Panagra Airways Boeing 727-227Adv

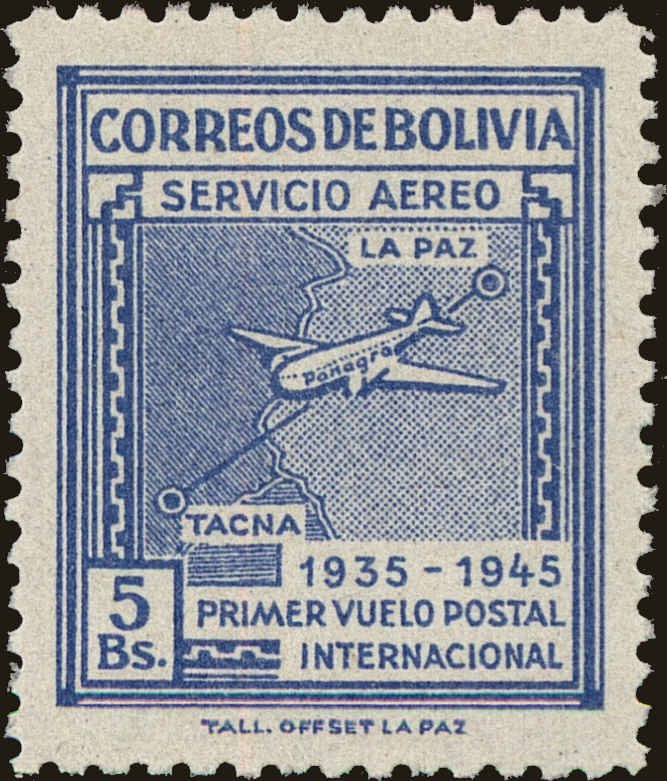
Bolivian postage stamp commemorating the 10th anniversary of the first flight of Panagra's air postal service in 1935.

Logo for Pan Am Airlines, which with W.R. Grace had created Panagra Airlines.

== See also ==
- List of defunct airlines of the United States
