= Parque Reducto No. 5 =

Park in Lima, Peru

Parque Reducto № 5
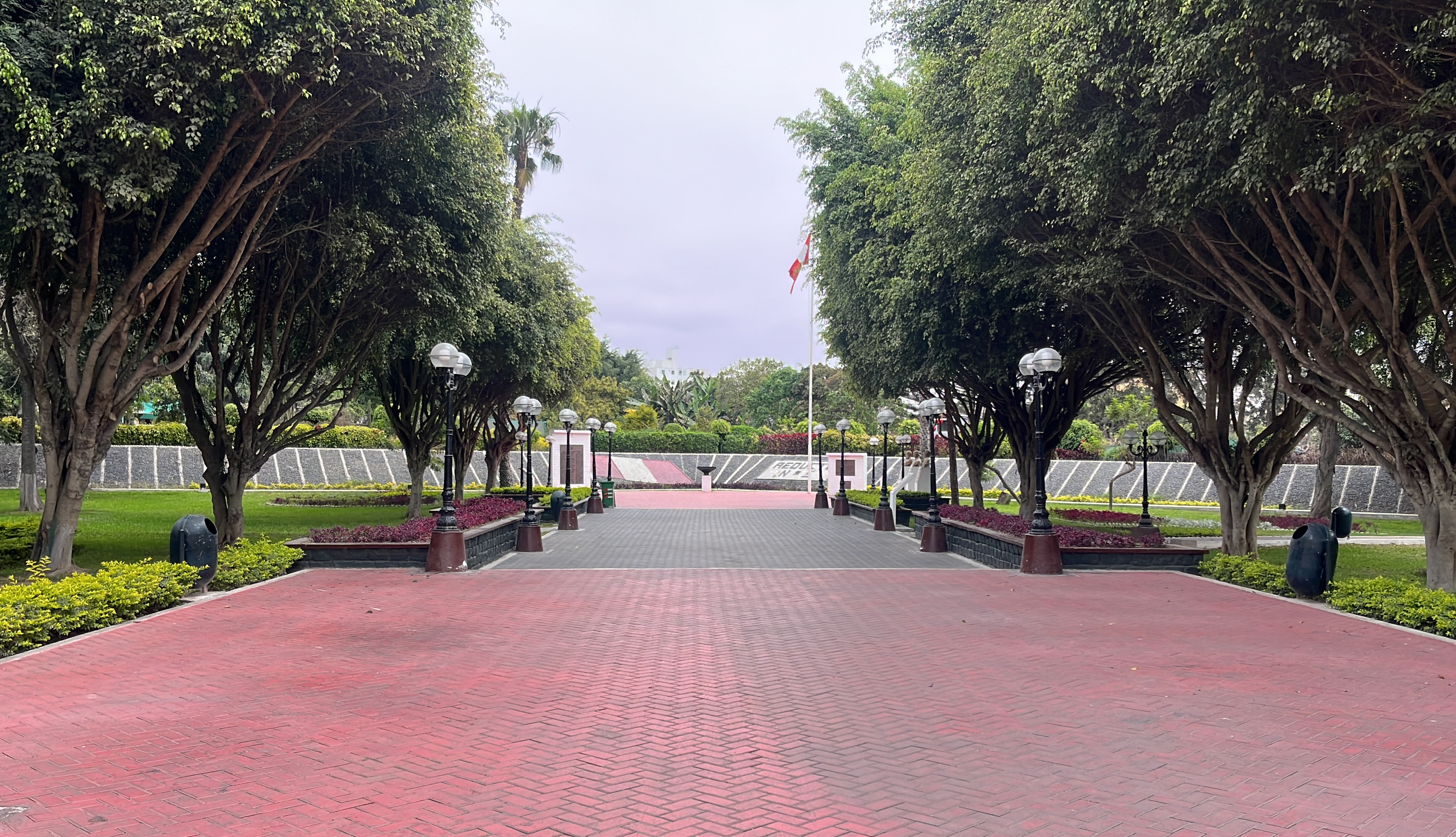
- Interactive map of Parque Reducto № 5
- Type: Public park
- Location: Surquillo, Lima
- Designation: Cultural heritage of Peru

Redoubt No. 5 Park (Spanish: Parque Reducto № 5) is a 1,210 m^{2} public park located in Angamos Avenue, in Surquillo, Lima, Peru. Located in a former redoubt built by the Peruvian Army during the War of the Pacific, it was declared a National Monument in 1944, and a Patriotic Sanctuary in 1965. It is part of the Cultural heritage of Peru.

It is currently used as a public park, where activities are coordinated by the local municipal authority. Besides Angamos Avenue, it is surrounded by Genaro Cobián, Manuel Bonilla (formerly Calle 10), José Neyra (formerly Calle 4) and Juan Fuentes streets.

== History ==
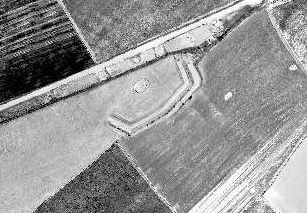
Aerial view in 1944.

The redoubts (reductos) were defenses built by the Peruvian Army in order to defend Lima from the Chilean Army during the War of the Pacific. In 1880, the Chileans had landed in Pisco and had successfully pushed north toward the city. There were ten in total. 5,500 men in total fought in the first four redobuts, since the rest were dissolved by Nicolás de Piérola and did not see action. The Chilean troops were numbered at 8,000 men—supported by the Chilean Navy—with 3,000 Peruvians and 2,214 Chileans being killed in action. Some of the unidentified bodies at the site were subsequently moved to the crypt at the city's main cemetery.

The park was affected by the city's growth from the mid-20th century onwards, having been partially destroyed due to the construction of Angamos Avenue around 1957. It was mistakenly identified as the "Reducto № 3" and restored in 1962 by the Army's Centre for Military Historical Studies (CEHMP) thanks to the initiative of its president, general Felipe de la Barra. The park was inaugurated on July 17, 1965.

It was declared a National Monument in 1963, a Patriotic Sanctuary in 1965 (prior to its inauguration), and ultimately protected as a monument in 1981, having been declared a Sanctuary of the Homeland on November 5, and protected from further destruction through the suspension of all construction works on November 19. In 1999, it was renamed as "Reducto № 5" due to investigations that started in 1995 and were further coordinated with the district's municipal government in 1998 by the Institute of Historical Studies of the Pacific (Spanish: Instituto de Estudios Históricos del Pacífico, INEHPA), a civil association dedicated to the studies of the War of the Pacific. It was declared a Historic Battle Site in 2017 by the Ministry of Culture through decree 495 of that year.

In 2021, an archaeological investigation was carried out by an INEHPA team, coinciding with the Bicentennial of the Independence of Peru.

== See also ==
- Morro Solar
- Parque Reducto No. 2
