= Limatambo International Airport =

Former airport of Lima, Peru; located in San Isidro (1935–1964)

Limatambo International Airport Aeropuerto Internacional de Limatambo
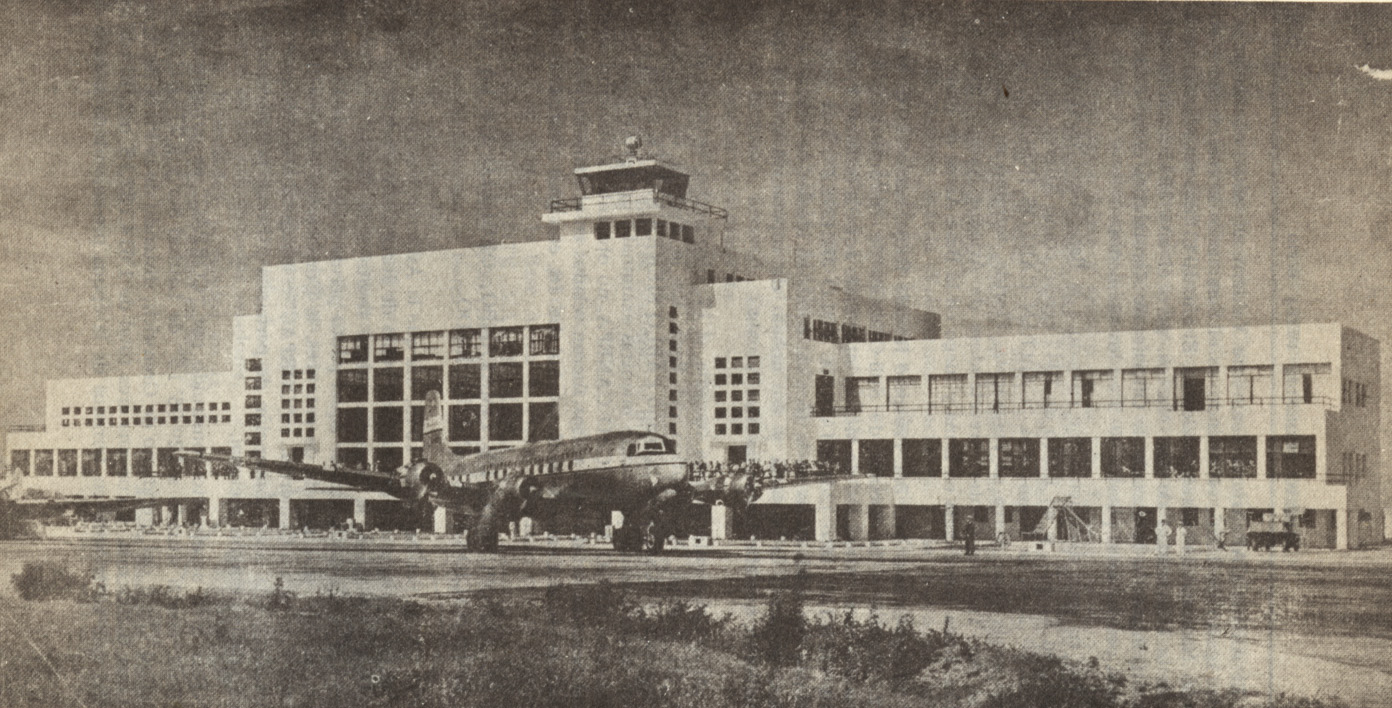
- The second terminal in 1960
- IATA: ~~LIM~~; ICAO: ~~SPIM~~

Summary
- Airport type: Defunct
- Owner: CORPAC
- Serves: Lima metropolitan area
- Location: San Isidro
- Opened: November 3, 1935
- Closed: January 31, 1964
- Hub for: Faucett Perú
- Coordinates: 12°05′53″S 77°00′55″W
- Interactive map of Limatambo International Airport

Runways
Direction	Length		Surface
Direction	ft	m	Surface
02/20	6,479	1,975	Asphalt
16/34	5,905	1,800	Asphalt

Limatambo International Airport ~~(IATA: LIM, ICAO: SPIM)~~ was an airport of Lima, Peru that operated from 3 November 1935 until 31 January 1964, when it was replaced by the Jorge Chávez International Airport in Callao. The terminal became the headquarters of the Ministry of the Interior of Peru, and the runways are incorporated within the city as the Guardia Civil and José Gálvez Barrenechea Avenues.

== History ==
Prior to the existence of the airport, the land had been occupied by the Indian town of Rimaj-Tampu, which venerated an oracle known as Rimaj.

The airport's first building was designed by Max Peña Prado, built by the construction company Roque Vargas Prada y Compañía, and inaugurated on November 3, 1935, by General Óscar R. Benavides, then president of Peru. The building was originally ivory-coloured, of an elongated plane and modernist architecture style, measuring 56 metres in length and 25 metres tall. It had an access ramp, occupied by the post office, a telephone exchange, an emergency lighting plant, warehouses, and offices.

The terminal was divided into a main hall and five additional floors, the former featuring (among several things) a golden map of South America made by Reynaldo Luza. The first floor featured airline offices, while the second housed offices of the Peruvian Corporation of Airports and Commercial Aviation (CORPAC). The third floor housed telecommunication centres, the fourth housed administrative and engineering offices, and the fifth a meteorological observatory. The control tower crowned the structure. The airport had two runways: one was 1,975 metres long and 100 metres wide, while the other's dimensions were 1,800 and 100 metres, and it also had a taxiway. The total paved area was 247,031 square metres.

Prior to its inauguration, the city of Lima was serviced by small air strips, such as those in Santa Beatriz (opened in 1924), Bellavista and Elmer Faucett (both located in neighbouring Callao, and the former interrupted by a huaca). The incomplete airport, named after the hacienda whose lands it occupied, was the first of its kind in the city, owned by CORPAC, after which the current neighbourhood is named. In addition to the terrain it had acquired, additional lads were expropriated from the Brescia family for its construction.

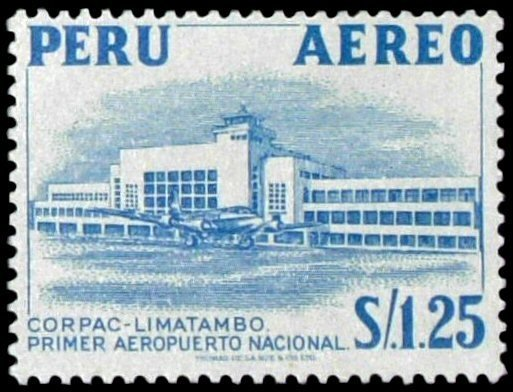
A Peruvian postage stamp with the image of the airport (1953)

The airport's modernisation was overseen by CORPAC, with construction finishing on September 23, 1948, under the government of José Luis Bustamante y Rivero, in honour of Jorge Chávez's fight across the Alps. A new terminal was built to replace the former building that was inaugurated in 1935, with Bustamante now being present at the re-inauguration ceremony. When construction works were finished, the airport had a total area of 1’614.132 m^{2}, and was surrounded by cornfields. In its heyday, it saw the arrival of international figures, such as John Wayne, Johnny Weissmüller, Mario Moreno, Obdulio Varela, Nat King Cole, Dolores del Río and Pedro Infante, among others. Due to this, a common sight at the airport was that of fans waiting for a celebrity to leave the terminal.

The airport's inability to host jet aircraft due to its runway's length combined with the city's growth eventually led to its closure on January 31, 1964. In order to replace the airport, Jorge Chávez International Airport, located in Callao, was inaugurated under the name "Lima-Callao Airport" in 1960, followed by a second inauguration under its current name in 1965.

== Former airlines and destinations ==
The airport had both national and international flights, and served as the hub for a number of airlines, including the Pan American-Grace Airways (whose building was located next to the original terminal) and Aerolíneas Peruanas from 1956 to 1960. The airport also serviced flights of civilian airline Faucett Perú and those of the Peruvian Air Force during the 1941 Ecuadorian–Peruvian War.

== Accidents and incidents ==
- September 9, 1941: A Mercury plane of the Aero Club del Perú crashed, killing the pilot.
- January 5, 1945: A Douglas DC-3A owned by the Pan American-Grace Airways, registration number NC- 19470, was stolen by two mechanics (Carlos Castro Martínez and Andrés Carpenter Van Roey) and two unknown persons, who boarded the aircraft and departed Lima. The flight crashed 5 miles south of Chorrillos. All four occupants were killed.
- 1950s: A commercial aircraft of the British Overseas Airways Corporation made a forced landing after the pilot noticed that the left side of the landing gear did not function. No injuries were reported.

== Legacy ==
=== Buildings ===
The airport's terminal continued to exist, eventually housing the Ministry of the Interior (with its main parking lot becoming the Plaza Treinta de Agosto), while the building used by Pan American-Grace Airways (located next to the first terminal) became the headquarters of the National Geographic Institute. The southeastern terrain adjacent to the airport was the site of the construction of a housing project known as the Torres de Limatambo, located on the corners of Aviación and Angamos avenues and promoted by architect Fernando Belaúnde during his second presidency.

=== Runways ===
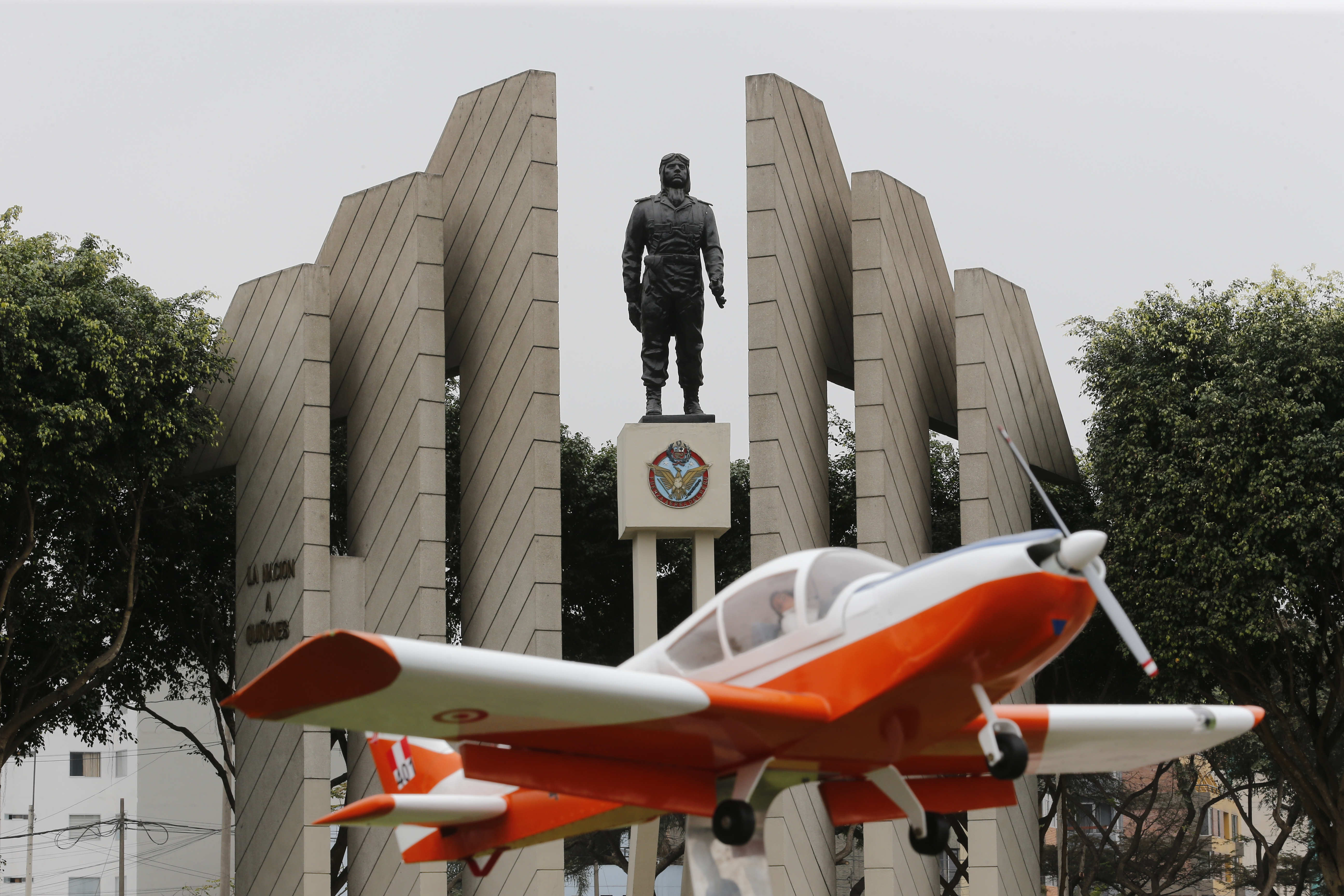
Quiñones Square in 2015.

Since the airport's disestablishment, its two runways have been incorporated into the city's road system in the form of two avenues: Civil Guard Avenue (Spanish: Avenida Guardia Civil) and Gálvez Barrenechea Avenue (Spanish: Avenida Gálvez Barrenechea, formerly Avenida Principal). The former is named after the Civil Guard, the main law enforcement agency in Peru during most of the 20th century (which also had its offices in the Interior Ministry), and the latter is named after politician José Gálvez Barrenechea, who served as President of the Senate twice (1945–1948 and 1956–1957).

The road that led to the terminal's main entrance, built during the mid 20th century as part of the airport's renovation works, became known as Corpac Avenue. It was connected to the former southern Pan-American Highway, now known as Republic of Panama Avenue.

== See also ==
- Jorge Chávez International Airport
- El Campo de Marte
