= Auna =

Healthcare provider

- Area served: Latin America
- Key people: Luis Felipe Pinillos (CEO); Jesus Zamora (Chairman)

Auna is an integrated healthcare provider with operations in Peru and Colombia. It has over 7,500 collaborators in its network.

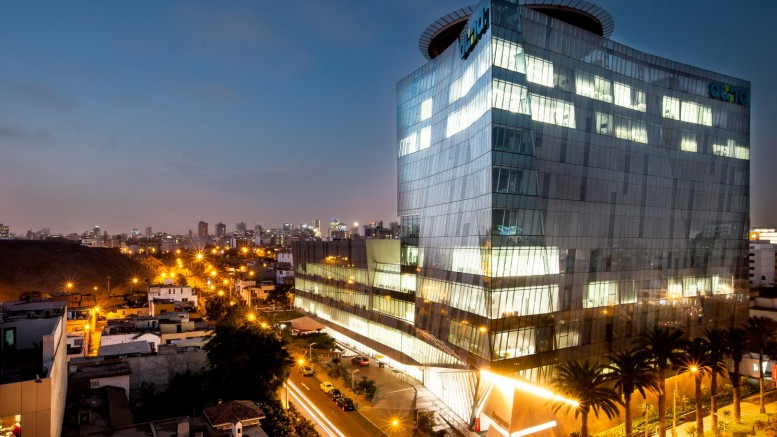
Clinica Delgado - Lima, Peru

== Peru ==
In Peru, it operates several private hospitals, clinics, and wellness centers. This network includes Clinica Delgado, one of Peru’s largest private hospitals, with a focus on high-complexity procedures, emergency care, gynecology and maternity.

Auna also operates Oncosalud, a prepaid plan covering oncological prevention and treatment, with over 1 million affiliates.

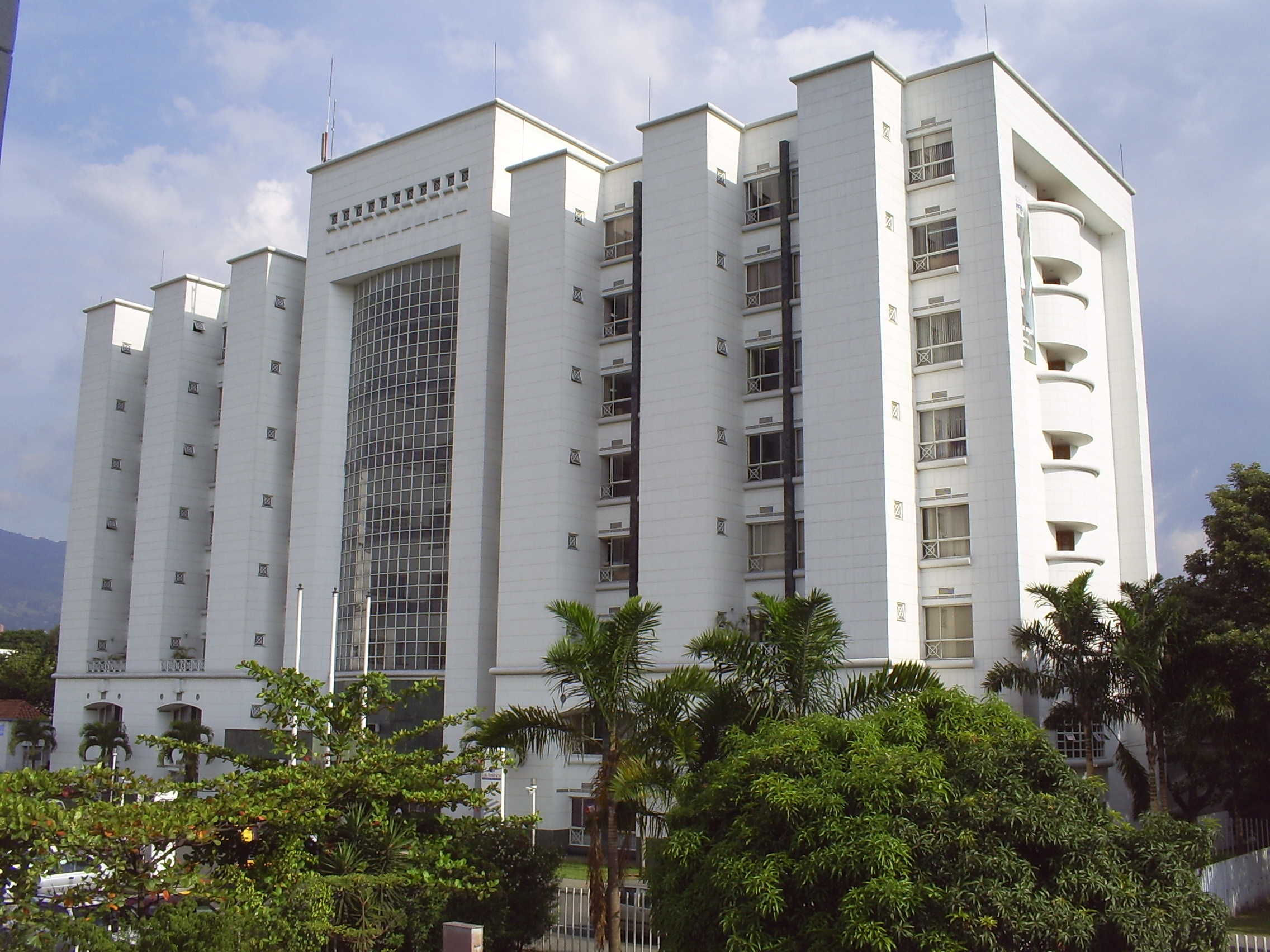
Clinica Las Americas (Torre Médica)

== Colombia ==
In Colombia, it owns Grupo Las Americas, a conglomerate operating a leading high-complexity hospital in Medellin, Clinica Las Americas.

It also operates a large oncology institute, Instituto de Cancerología, and Clínica Portoazul, a premium high-complexity hospital in Barranquilla, the country’s 4th largest market.
