= Giacomo Gambetta =

Peruvian footballer (born 1998)

Personal information
- Full name: Giacomo Gambetta Sponza
- Date of birth: 27 September 1998 (age 28)
- Place of birth: Santiago de Surco District, Lima, Peru
- Position: Goalkeeper

Team information
- Current team: Westside Grovely
- Number: 1

Youth career
- Universidad San Martín
- Sport Boys

Senior career*
Years	Team	Apps	(Gls)
2018–2022	Sport Boys	7	(0)
2023	Old Bridge Salisbury		
2025–	Westside Grovely		
- * Club domestic league appearances and goals as of 22:08, 11 December 2022 (UTC)

Giacomo Gambetta Sponza (born 27 September 1998) is a Peruvian footballer who plays as a goalkeeper for Australian FQPL 5 − Metro side Westside Grovely FC.

== Club career ==
=== Sport Boys ===
Gambetta is a product of Universidad San Martín and later joined Sport Boys.

He was promoted to the first team squad ahead of the 2018 season as the second choice behind Fernando Martinuzzi. He got his official debut in the last game of the 2018 Torneo Descentralizado season, 25 November 2018, against Unión Comercio, which ended with a 4–2 defeat. At the end of December 2018, he signed a new contract until the end of 2020. In the 2019 season, Gambetta was only on the bench for six league games and made zero appearances.

=== Australia ===
Halfway through 2023, Gambetta joined FC Old Bridge Salisbury; a club based in Salisbury, Queensland in Australia.

In November 2024, ahead of the 2025 season, he signed with Australian FQPL 5 − Metro side Westside Grovely FC.

== Personal life ==
Giacomo is the younger brother of Peruvian footballer Gianmarco Gambetta.
