= Westside F.C. (disambiguation) =

Westside F.C. may refer to:

- Westside F.C., a football club in Nigeria
- Westside F.C. (England), a football club in England
- Westside Grovely FC, a football club in Queensland, Australia
