= Santiago de Surco =

District in Lima, Peru

- District
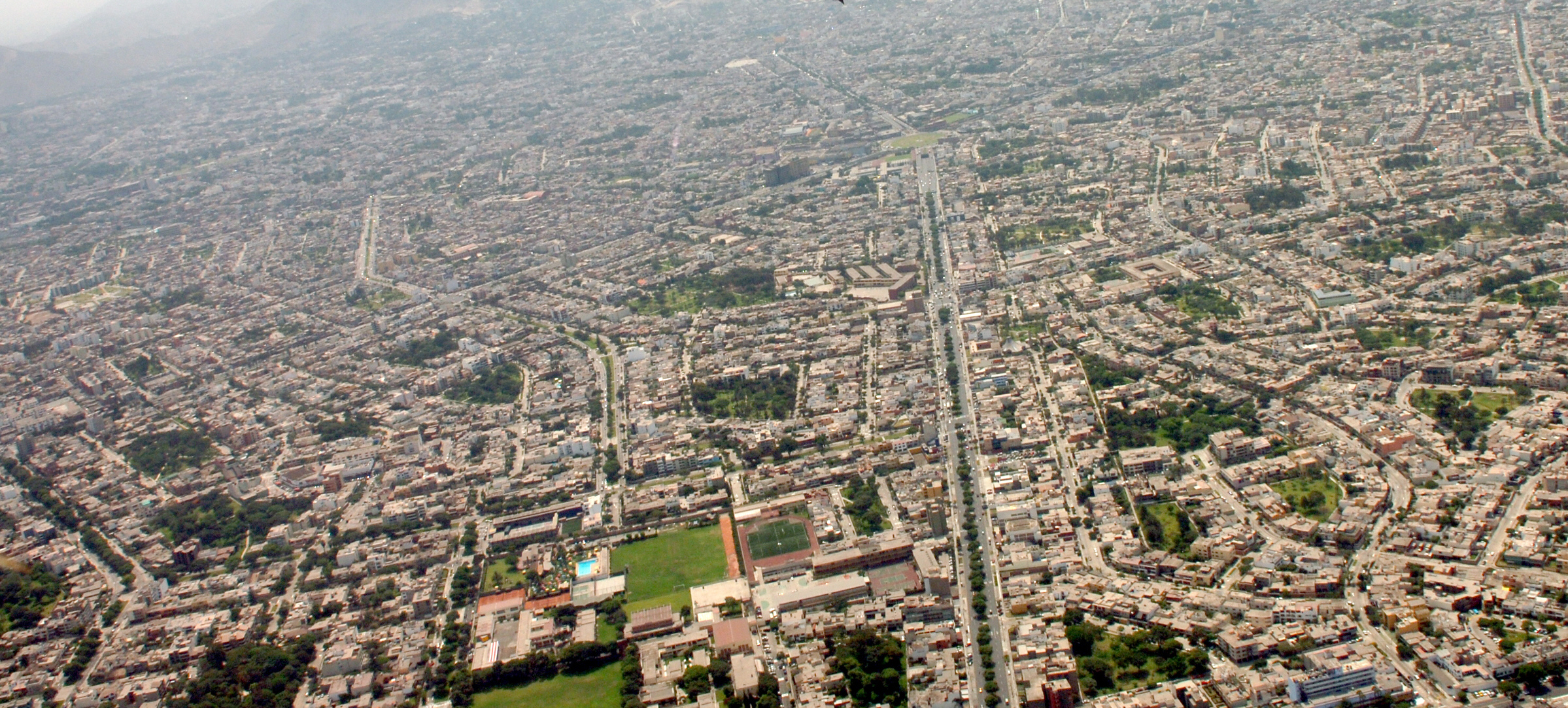
- View towards the east of Higuereta roundabout

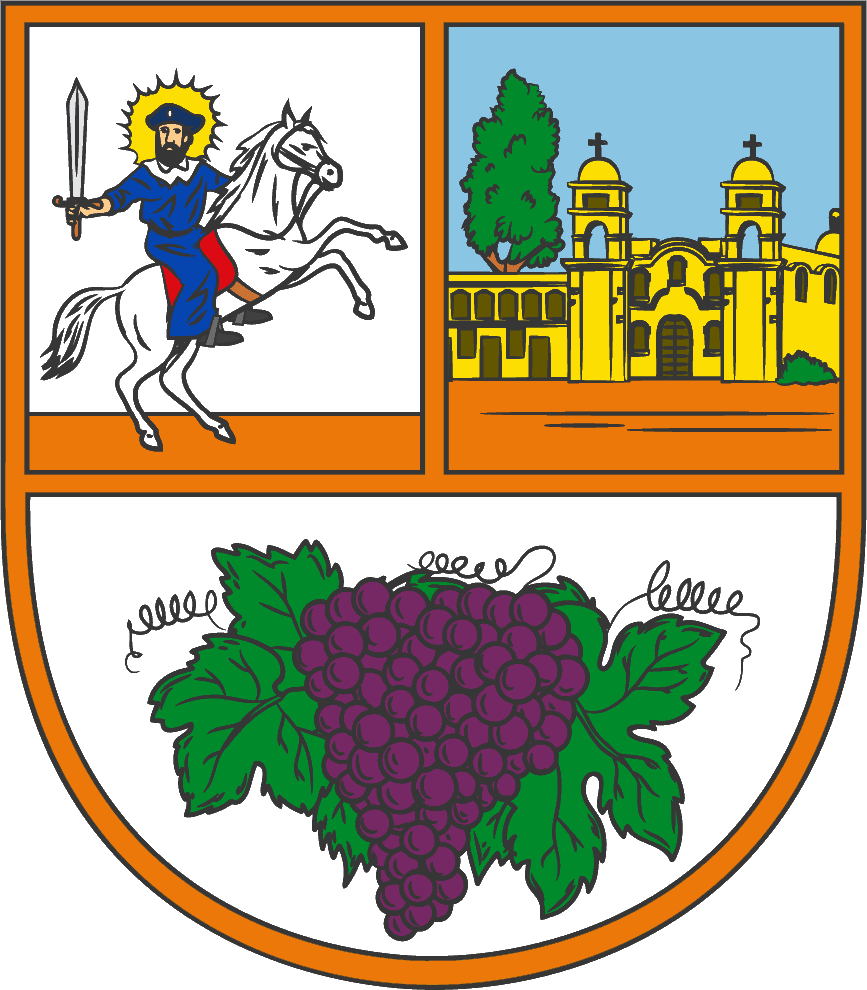
- Coat of arms

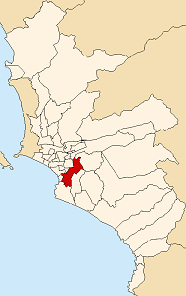
- Location of Santiago de Surco in Peru
- Coordinates: 12°09′S 77°01′W
- Country: Peru
- Department: Lima
- Province: Lima
- Founded: December 16, 1929

Government
  - Mayor: Carlos Bruce

Area
  - Total: 34.75 km^{2} (13.42 sq mi)

Population (2023)
  - Total: 426,758
  - Density: 12,280/km^{2} (31,810/sq mi)
- Time zone: UTC-5 (PET)
- UBIGEO: 150140
- Website: munisurco.gob.pe

Santiago de Surco (Spanish: [sãnˈtja.ɣo ð̞e ˈsuɾ.ko]; lit. 'Santiago of Surco'), commonly known simply as Surco, is a district of Lima, Peru. It is bordered on the north with the district of Ate Vitarte and La Molina; on the east with San Juan de Miraflores, on the west with San Borja, Surquillo, Miraflores and Barranco, and on the south with Chorrillos.

Due to its relatively large area, it is a very heterogeneous district, having inhabitants belonging to all socio-economic levels.

The district is recognised for its green spaces. The northern parts of Santiago de Surco, which are close to the districts of La Molina and San Borja, are known as Monterrico, Chacarilla and Casuarinas. They are considerably more developed than the southern side of the district, having more upper-class housing and all four major shopping centers of the district.

== Etymology ==
The district is named after James the Great (Santiago), a Catholic saint, and the chieftainship of the same name once based in Armatambo, an archaeological site next to the Morro Solar. The Ichma dominion itself was named after the river of the same name. The original name was Sulco, a name that changed following the death of Antonio del Solar, Sulco's first Spanish encomendero. The name was originally given to a reduction established in the area by the Spanish.

== History ==
Typical flats in Surco.

The Santiago de Surco area was already populated before Inca times. During the Viceroyalty of Peru, Surco became a vacation spot for the wealthy. Back in those times, Santiago de Surco comprised not only its current territory but also the area of present-day Barranco, Chorrillos, San Juan de Miraflores, Villa María del Triunfo and Villa El Salvador.

=== Spanish period ===
In 1539, the doctrine of the town of Surco was established by the Spanish government. The town's jurisdiction reached what would later become the districts of Barranco and Chorrillos. Many towns were granted to encomenderos, a system under which the Mercedarians were most benefitted. The parish of Surco was placed under the patronage of the Apostle Saint James. The town's location near the sea, its agricultural industry and its pleasant weather saw it become a resort town for the people of Lima, from officials of the government (including the Viceroys) to regular workers.

One of the biggest attractions of Surco is the old church of San Juan Grande, which is currently under reconstruction. In earlier years this church remained unwatched and with no care from the municipality of Surco and was inhabited by locals in poverty.

It is said that this old church was communicated to the Santiago Apostol Cathedral a few miles from there in old Surco by a sort of underground passages built by the Jesuits to be used in case of war or danger. What is a fact is the old skulls and little babies bones found by curious people who walked in the catacombs.

This church was built by the Jesuit order in 1752, using adobe, canes, stones and wood only. The order was expelled in 1767 from all the Spanish territories due to disagreements with the Spanish monarch Carlos III and then after their properties were confiscated. Thus this place was abandoned. Thereafter, the land was divided into two pieces, a large (grande) parcel and a smaller one, and sold at auction. The church then took its name from the large parcel, which was "grande" in Spanish.

=== Republican period ===
This house-property was used as a shelter for Cáceres' troops in times of war. While sheltering at one point, Caceres didn't know from where the Chilean troops, who had just arrived a few hours earlier in Conchan, could attack the city. So he used the help of a young boy. There was an immense 300-year-old pine tree in the patio that divided the church from the house-property, and even though it fell in January 2001, it remains unbroken in the collective memory of Surco as a silent witness to what happened. Julio César Escobar, the young boy, became a hero at the age of 13 during the San Juan and Miraflores battle by giving his life for the sake of the country. Julio climbed up to the top of the pine tree, to be a lookout and warn Caceres about the Chilean troops' approach. When Julio saw the Chileans, he was too high to climb down to warn about the Chilean troops' arrival. The Peruvian troops fled from the shooting that had begun and Julio was not able to escape. Unfortunately, the patriots were defeated, and the kid hero was shot dead near the immense tree. The church was then sacked and burned by the Chilean troops, who later converted it into a stable.

=== History as a district ===
The old district of San José de Surco was created by Law 6644 on December 16, 1929 out of the Barranco District. In 1944, Santiago de Surco district was renamed and get territories from the old Ate district.

The district of Santiago de Surco, at that time, bordered to the north, with the districts of La Victoria and Ate. To the east, with the district of Pachacámac. To the south, with the district of Lurín. To the southwest, with the district of Chorrillos. To the west, with the district of Barranco. And to the northwest, with the district of Miraflores. Likewise, at that time, it covered the jurisdiction of the current districts of Villa El Salvador, Villa María del Triunfo, San Juan de Miraflores, and part of San Borja.

In the decade of the 40's and 50's, the eastern and southern areas of the district began to become overpopulated and suffer from a massive invasion, such as: "La Barriada de Ciudad de Dios" and the "Sociedad El Triunfo de la Restauración". Therefore, in the 1960s, Santiago de Surco began to suffer from a massive territorial cut. First, thanks to the founding of the district of Villa María del Triunfo, whose new district ended up also covering what would currently be Villa El Salvador. Later, in 1965, Santiago de Surco suffered another large cut, after the founding of the San Juan de Miraflores district, due to the settlement of the Pamplona Alta hill. Later, in 1983, the district got its last big cut, thanks to the founding of the San Borja district.

== Government ==
The Transitional Law on Municipalities was enacted on January 2, 1857, at which time Surco was part of Barranco District. In Peru, mayors have been elected by universal secret ballot since 1963, with a suspension between 1969 and 1979. Since 1999, the term has been four years.

=== List of mayors ===
Mayor	Party	Term begin	Term end
Julio Mendieta y Copello		1929	1930
Hipólito Márquez		1930	1930
Daniel P. Cornejo		1930	1931
Carlos E. Gibson		1931	1931
Manuel de Jesús		1931	1932
Daniel P. Cornejo		1932	1934
Jose F. Cuya		1934	1934
Daniel P. Cornejo		1936	1936
Juan Enrique Capurro		1936	1942
Alberto Nalvarte		1942	1943
Fernando Faustor Valera		1943	1945
Luis Camoretti Velásquez		1945	1948
Ezequiel Hutarra Becerra		1948	1953
Daniel Nalvarte Herrera		1954	1955
Juan E. Capurro		1955	1956
Fernando Faustor Valera		1956	1956
Ezequiel Paredes Guizado		1956	1957
Celestino Jara Hidalgo		1957	1959
Rogelio Márquez Sánchez		1959	1959
Joaquin Planas Gamero		1961	1962
Eduardo Gordillo Abizarroeta		1962	1962
Juan Silva Calmet		1962	1963
Roberto Zevallos Ventocilla		1963	1963
Luis Reyes Inga		1963	1963
Rodolfo Venturo Zapata	APRA-UNO	1964	1966
Julio Montjoy Guisado	APRA-UNO	1967	1969
Luis Palma Fernández		1969	1969
Raúl Modenesi La Rosa		1969	1971
Justo Ramos Arce		1971	1971
Luis La Cruz Rodríguez		1973	1976
Alicia Brenner de Freeman		1976	1978
Hugo Sotillo Monasterio		1978	1979
Piero Pierantoni Cámpora		1979	1979
Carlos Olguin Lira		1980	1980
Fausto Huertas del Pino		1980	1980
Humberto Cuya Soriano	Acción Popular	1981	1983
Jaime Payet Martínez	Partido Popular Cristiano	1984	1986
Carlos Letts Colmenares	Partido Popular Cristiano	1987	1989
Manuel Cáceda Granthon	FREDEMO (PPC)	1990	1992
Manuel Cáceda Granthon	L.I.N.º 3	1993	1995
Carlos Dargent Chamot	Somos Lima	1996	1998
Carlos Dargent Chamot	Somos Perú	1999	2002
Carlos Dargent Chamot	Somos Perú	2003	2006
Juan Manuel del Mar Estremadoyro	Unidad Nacional	2007	2010
Roberto Gómez Baca	Somos Perú	2011	2014
Roberto Gómez Baca	Somos Perú	2015	2018
Jean Pierre Combe Portocarrero	Acción Popular	2019	2022
Carlos Bruce Montes de Oca	Avanza País	2023	2026

=== Subdivisions ===
Administratively, the district is divided into 9 sectors.

=== Twin cities ===
List of sister cities, designated by Sister Cities International:

- Gastonia, North Carolina, United States
- Providencia, RM, Chile

== Geography ==
Santiago de Surco has a very varied climate and landscape. It is part of Lima's Cono Centro, an unofficial subregion of the city.

=== Climate ===
Climate data for Lima
Month	Jan	Feb	Mar	Apr	May	Jun	Jul	Aug	Sep	Oct	Nov	Dec	Year
Record high °F	79	79	79	75	72	68	66	64	66	68	72	75	72
Record high °C	26	26	26	24	22	20	19	18	19	20	22	24	22
Average precipitation days	1	1	0	0	1	2	3	3	3	2	2	0	16
Average rainy days	4	2	3	2	5	11	12	15	13	7	5	3	82
Average relative humidity (%)	85	80	80	85	85	85	85	85	85	85	85	85	84.2
Mean monthly sunshine hours	179.1	169	139.2	184	116.4	50.6	28.6	32.3	37.3	65.3	89	139.2	1,284
Source: Weatherbase (Temperature, precipitation and humidity). and Universidad Complutense de Madrid (Sunlight)

== Demographics ==
Surco, as it is commonly known, obtained the title of "garden district" four times in the management of Carlos Dargent. In its jurisdiction, families of high socioeconomic level largely reside (Monterrico and surrounding areas); while in the southern area there are homes from different socioeconomic strata, including: upper middle, middle and lower middle. The district covers the urbanizations of Valle Hermoso, Monterrico, Las Casuarinas, La Castellana, Los Álamos, La Floresta de Monterrico, Cerros de Camacho, Pancho Fierro, Santa Constanza, Chacarilla del Estanque, Higuereta, Neptuno, Tambo de Monterrico, El Dorado, Chama, Alborada, Liguria, Las Gardenias, Santa Teresa, Bella Luz, Vista Alegre, San Ignacio de Monterrico, Prolongación Benavides, Monterrico Sur, Los Rosales, La Capullana, Los Precursores, La Cruceta, Los Próceres, Santo Cristo, La Virreyna, San Roque, La Ensenada, San Pedrito, Sagitario, Surco Viejo or Surco Pueblo, Jorge Chávez, Santa María, Cercado de Surco, Los Parrales and Camino Real. In areas where per capita income is high, such as in Las Casuarinas, access is restricted. The price of a home in such an urbanization is usually very high. However, there are areas of this same socioeconomic level such as Chacarilla or other parts of Monterrico, where access is free. Santiago de Surco is characterized by being a large district with a large amount of green areas, being behind the San Borja district.

Due to the fame that the district has, some urbanizations belonging to the district of Chorrillos, such as the areas of La Encantada and Las Brisas de Villa, have expressed their desire to be administered by Santiago de Surco in June 2013. Despite the existence of Peruvian law, which establishes that every district must have territorial continuity, a factor that does not apply there. All this, due to the inattention on the part of the district of Chorrillos, to such urbanizations.

In the southern part of the district, divided by Tomás Marsano Avenue, there is a coexistence of different socioeconomic strata. Its population belongs to both the medium-high socioeconomic level: urbanizations of Los Próceres, Los Precursores, Sagitario, La Campiña, Viñedos de Surco, etc; as well as, at the average socioeconomic level: urbanizations of Rodrigo Franco and Surco Viejo. Likewise, there are areas inhabited by families of the lower-middle socioeconomic level, where the highest crime rate in the entire district is found: human settlements of Viva el Perú, San Gabino, Parque Alto, Parque Bajo, Tejada Alta, Manuel Medina Paredes and Señor of Miracles.

It is estimated that in Santiago de Surco, given its large size, there are around 60 small human settlements, located near its limits with the districts of San Juan de Miraflores, Chorrillos and Barranco. As in the districts of La Molina and San Borja, the homes in these human settlements and popular urbanizations are self-built. In human settlements such as Señor de los Milagros, Viva El Perú and Diente de Oro there are precarious construction homes. These are inhabitants who can be considered vulnerable people. Even so, a large part of these areas have basic public services.

=== Education ===
Some of the most exclusive and prestigious universities of Lima are located in Surco, including the University of Lima, ESAN University, Universidad Ricardo Palma, and Universidad Peruana de Ciencias Aplicadas. Other prestigious high school institutions such as Markham College, Colegio Santa Margarita, Colegio Santa María Marianistas, Colegio de la Inmaculada, and Colegio Cambridge are also located within the district.

The Humboldt II campus of the Deutsche Schule Lima Alexander von Humboldt (Colegio Peruano Alemán Alexander von Humboldt), a German international school, is located in Surco.

The Asociación Academia de Cultura Japonesa, and the Japanese international school are in Surco.

=== Notable people ===
- Giacomo Gambetta, professional football player

== Culture ==
Many of Lima's largest shopping centers are located in the district, including the Jockey Plaza, Caminos del Inca, Chacarilla and El Polo. Santiago de Surco has won five awards for having some of the best-kept green areas in Lima.

La Vendimia (grapevine): The Viticulture Association and the Municipality of Santiago de Surco sponsor this showcase for regional crafts, cuisine and wine processes within the framework of the "Vineyard Harvest of Surco." The craft of wine preparation is demonstrated through macerating grapes by the traditional method of treading by foot. Grape fermentation and aging processes are also shown. A Reina de la Vendimia (Queen of the Harvest) is chosen and local performers stage their talents. This seasonal festival takes place from March 17 to 26, annually and it is one of the most traditionalist festivities. It is celebrated in downtown Surco.
The first Vendimia was started by Engineer Pedro Venturo Zapata, owner and operator of "Hacienda Higuereta y Anexos - Negociacion Vinicola Pedro Venturo S.A." (1925–1952).

== Transport ==
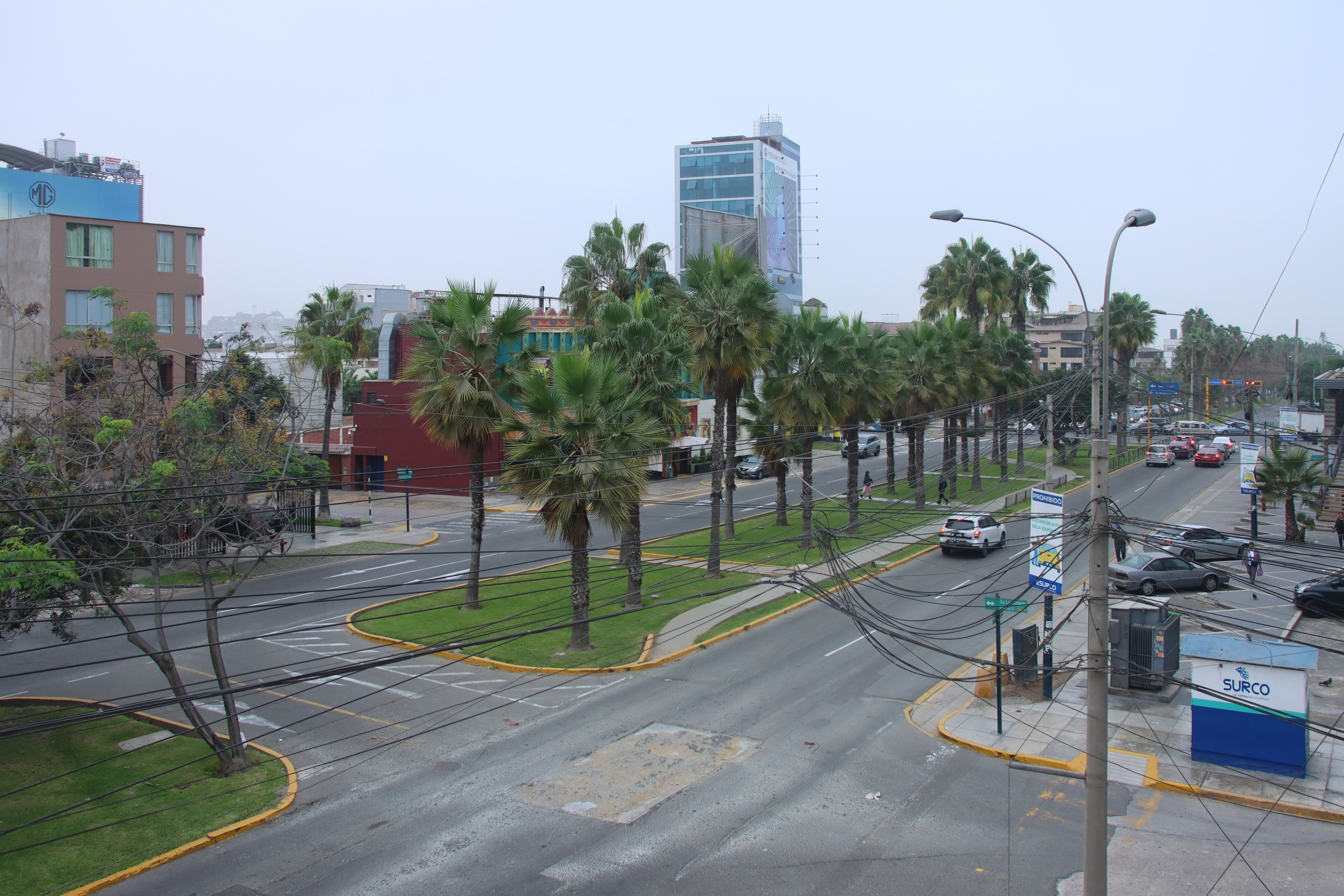
Avenida Velasco Astete

Several of Lima's most important avenues pass through Santiago de Surco, including the South Cone avenues, which connect the district with downtown Lima, Cono Sur districts, San Isidro (Lima's financial district), and Miraflores. Three stations of Line 1 of the Lima Metro (Jorge Chavez, Ayacucho and Cabitos) are located in the district.

== See also ==
- Administrative divisions of Peru
