= Pedro Venturo Zapata =

Peruvian engineer (1896–1952)

Pedro Manuel Venturo Zapata (February 18, 1896, Lima, Peru – December 12, 1952) was an entrepreneur, engineer, agronomist, paso horse breeder, vintner and Minister of Agriculture. He was the CEO of Hacienda Higuereta y Anexos - Negociacion Vinicola Pedro Venturo S.A. from 1925 to 1952.

== Biography ==
Venturo completed his primary and secondary studies at the College of La Recoleta in Lima. In 1912, he enrolled at the National Agrarian University in Peru and studied agriculture and veterinary medicine, finishing his studies in 1917.

After graduation he was immediately appointed assistant at the National Institute of Microbiology where he worked on his dissertation on "cattle tuberculosis in Peru".

At 21 he was elected to the City Council of the Barranco district in the popular election of 1918.

He became president of the Peruvian Association of Agricultural Engineers and was a member of the Departmental Census Board, a member of The Miraflores City Council and a chairman of the board of the Cattlemen's Association Peru on two occasions.

He belonged to the Technical Body of Appraisals, the Higher Council at the Ministry of Agriculture, the National Board of Food of Peru. He was Vice President of The Rotary Club of Lima and was linked to various agricultural societies, Livestock and Industrial.

== Hacienda Higuereta ==
In 1925 Venturo acquired the "Hacienda Higuereta" from his father who had died that same year. He led the Hacienda to increased levels of productivity of Pisco, Brandy, Cognac, Champagne, red and white wine (Albilla Superior, Oporto, Moscato Dulce), Vermouth and other products such as balsamic vinegar, grape juice and Martini.

He also raised livestock, with over 300 holsteins, 2 bulls, chickens, turkeys and pigs, They produced eggs, milk and meat for the community. Venturo was also one of the largest breeders of the Peruvian Paso Horse.

Venturo was an honorary member of various labor organizations and he improved living conditions of his employees, building houses for his workers and funding the construction of sports fields and a cinema.

The Hacienda was in some ways a small town with homes for the employees, comprising a school, a park, a wood shed, a machine shop, a pool, soccer fields, a chapel, a bodega, and public restrooms in addition to the work spaces.

Venturo was a member of the Wine Committee of the National Agrarian Society and organizer of the Advisory Mission, in 1930, to study the law of alcoholic beverages and promotion of national viticulture. He organized the first Harvest Festival in Peru called "La Vendimia", chairing the Organizing Committee in 1937 in Santiago de Surco. La Vendimia Wine Festival continues today.

After Venturo's death in 1952 the company and hacienda were split and sold to different investors. In 1967 General Juan Velasco Alvarado took power in a coup d'état against President Fernando Belaúnde Terry. As part of Velasco's agrarian reforms, small, non-producing haciendas including The Hacienda Higuereta were demolished.

== Innovation and final years ==
Venturo traveled throughout the national territory, covering the various areas of coast, highlands and mountains. He chaired the Fourth Agronomic Convention which took place in Tingo María in 1945. He became Minister of Agriculture during the government rule of president José Bustamante y Rivero from 1947 to 1948.

He made several trips abroad, visiting the United States, Canada, Argentina, Brazil, Bolivia and Uruguay, while working selectively on viticulture, adapting valuable wine varieties for cultivation in Peru. He chronicled the progress of Agriculture and Livestock items in Peru and gave lectures on important topics related to agricultural activity.

He dealt with the problem of drinking water in Lima and utilization of urban waste and sewage, creating the way to transform them into useful fertilizers. often designing new processes for the city.

He spent his last years conducting agricultural experiments including investigations into the possibility of cultivating the beach sands. Based on these investigations, Venturo was invited to present at The Sixth International Congress of Rangeland organized by the United States in August 1952.

He died on December 12, 1952, in the district of San Isidro, because of hepatic coma. He was buried in El Ángel Cemetery in Lima.

== Legacy ==
In 1965 the School that was part of the property Hacienda Higuereta in Surco (still stands there today) changed its name to "Colegio Pedro Venturo".

In 1975 a street was named after Pedro Venturo Zapata to honor the man and what he accomplished in his Hacienda Higuereta in Lima, Peru.
