= Peruvian Paso =

Breed of horse

Peruvian Horse
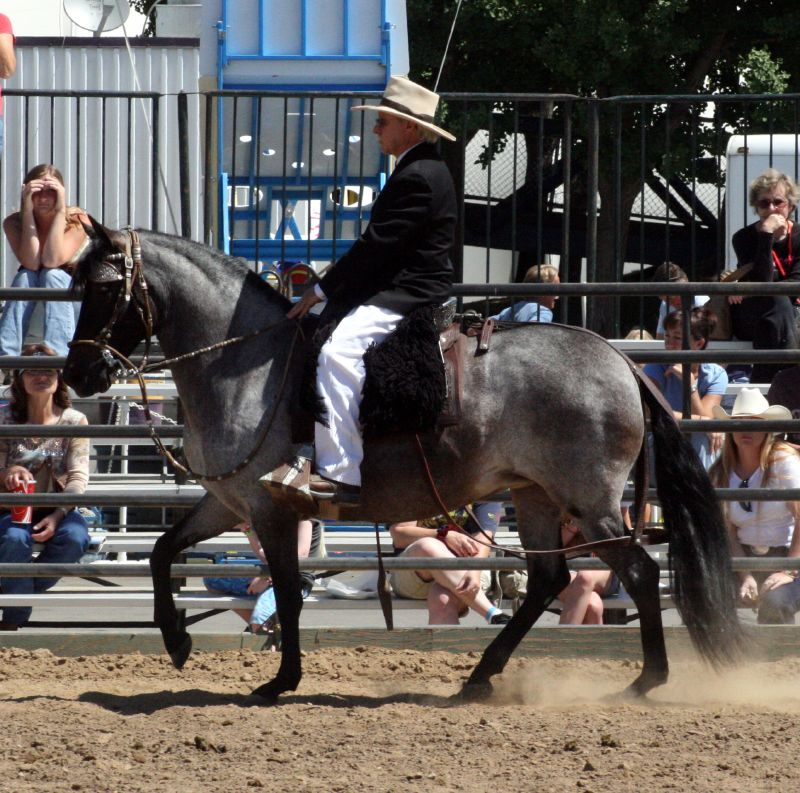
- A Peruvian Horse
- Other names: Peruvian
- Country of origin: Peru

Traits
- Distinguishing features: Gaited, Spanish conformation

Breed standards
- North American Peruvian Horse Association

The Peruvian Horse is a breed of light saddle horse known for its smooth ride. It is distinguished by a natural, four-beat, lateral gait called the paso llano. This breed is protected by the Peruvian government through Decree number 25919 of Peru enacted on November 28, 1992, and has been declared a Cultural Heritage of the Nation by the National Institute of Culture (INC). Due to the isolation suffered for about 400 years and the selection made by their breeders, this breed is very particular in their body proportions and an ambling gait or "paso llano" that is characteristic. It is typical of the northern Peruvian regions of the country from which it originated. Trujillo city is considered the cradle of typical Peruvian Horses.

== History ==
Smooth-gaited horses, generally known as Palfreys, existed in the Middle Ages, and the Jennet in particular was noted for its ambling gaits. Peruvians trace their ancestry to these ambling Jennets; as well as to the Barb, which contributed strength and stamina; and to the Andalusian which added style, conformation and action.

Horses arrived in South America during the Spanish Conquest, beginning with the arrival of Pizarro in 1531. Foundation bloodstock came from Spain, Jamaica, Panama and other areas of Central America. Importations increased after 1542, when the Spanish created the Viceroyalty of New Castilla. This later became the Viceroyalty of Peru, an important center of Spain's New World viceroyalties in the eighteenth century.

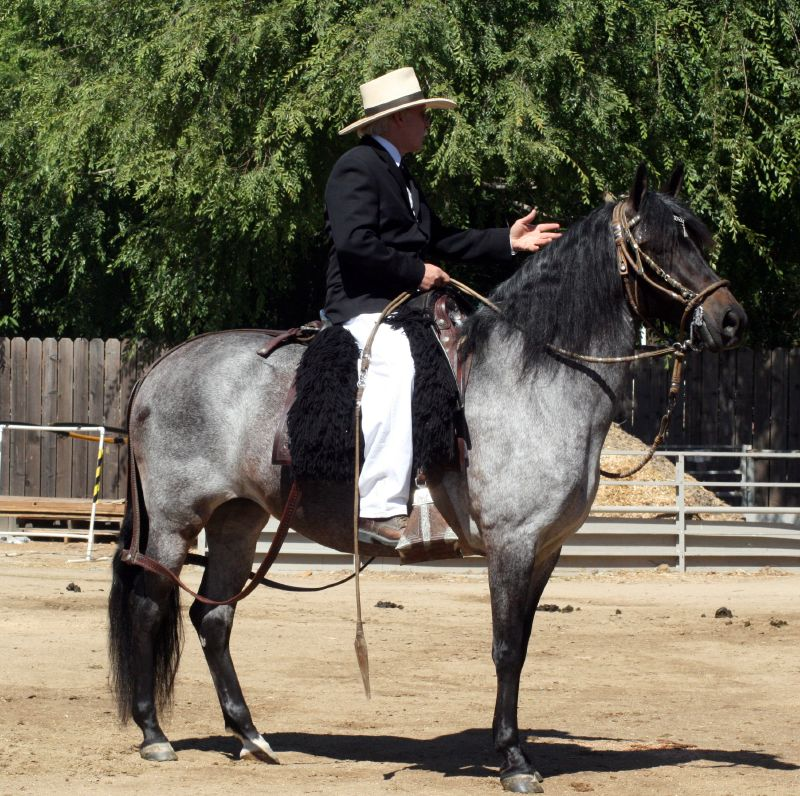
A Peruvian Horse in traditional tack

Once in Peru, they were used primarily for transportation and breeding stock. In the north of Peru, the vast size of sugar and cotton plantations meant that overseers needed to travel long distances, often taking days to cross the plantation. In the south of Peru, the arid deserts that separated settlements required sturdy, strong horses. In both cases, smooth-gaited horses with good endurance were required. On the other hand, Peru did not develop a livestock-based economy, and thus did not need to breed for the speed or agility characteristic of stock horses.

Over time, Peruvian breeders kept the bloodlines clean and selectively bred primarily for gait, conformation, and temperament. They wanted strong, hardy animals that were comfortable to ride and easy to control. Over four centuries, their dedication to breeding only the best gaited bloodstock resulted in the modern Peruvian Horse.

A decline in the use of Peruvians was seen in the southern part of Peru in the early 1900s, following the building of major highways that allowed motor travel to replace the use of the horse. Many of the major breeders in the area gave their best horses away to peasants living in the nearby quebradas (valleys). It was in one of these quebradas that breeder Gustavo de la Borda found the horse that was to become the most important modern sire in the breed, Sol de Oro (Viejo).

The Peruvian Horse continued to flourish in the northern regions because it was still needed for transportation on the haciendas. This changed with the harsh Agrarian Reforms instituted by the government of Juan Velasco Alvarado in the late 1960s that had a devastating effect on the Peruvian Horse within Peru. Major breeding operations were broken up and breeding stock was lost. Because interest in the Peruvian Horse was growing in the United States and Central America at the same time, many of the finest Peruvians were exported, leading to a period where it appeared the Peruvian Horse would fade in its homeland.

Don Pedro Venturo Zapata was a major breeder of the Peruvians in his "Hacienda Higuereta y Anexos - Negociacion Vinicola Pedro Venturo S.A." from 1925 to 1952.

The Asociación Nacional de Criadores y Propietarios de Caballos Peruanos de Paso (ANCPCPP), an organisation for breeders and owners Peruvian Paso horses was established in 1947.

The last quarter of the 20th century saw a resurgence in the Peruvian Horse's fortune in Peru. The annual National Show in Lima is a major event in Peruvian cultural life. The Peruvian has been declared a Patrimonio Cultural (Cultural Heritage) of Peru in an attempt to shore up the breed within the country. There are now laws in place that restrict the export of national champion horses.

Peruvian Horses are noted internationally for their good temperament and comfortable ride. As of 2003, there are approximately 25,000 horses worldwide, used for pleasure riding, trail, horse shows, parades, and endurance riding.

== Characteristics ==
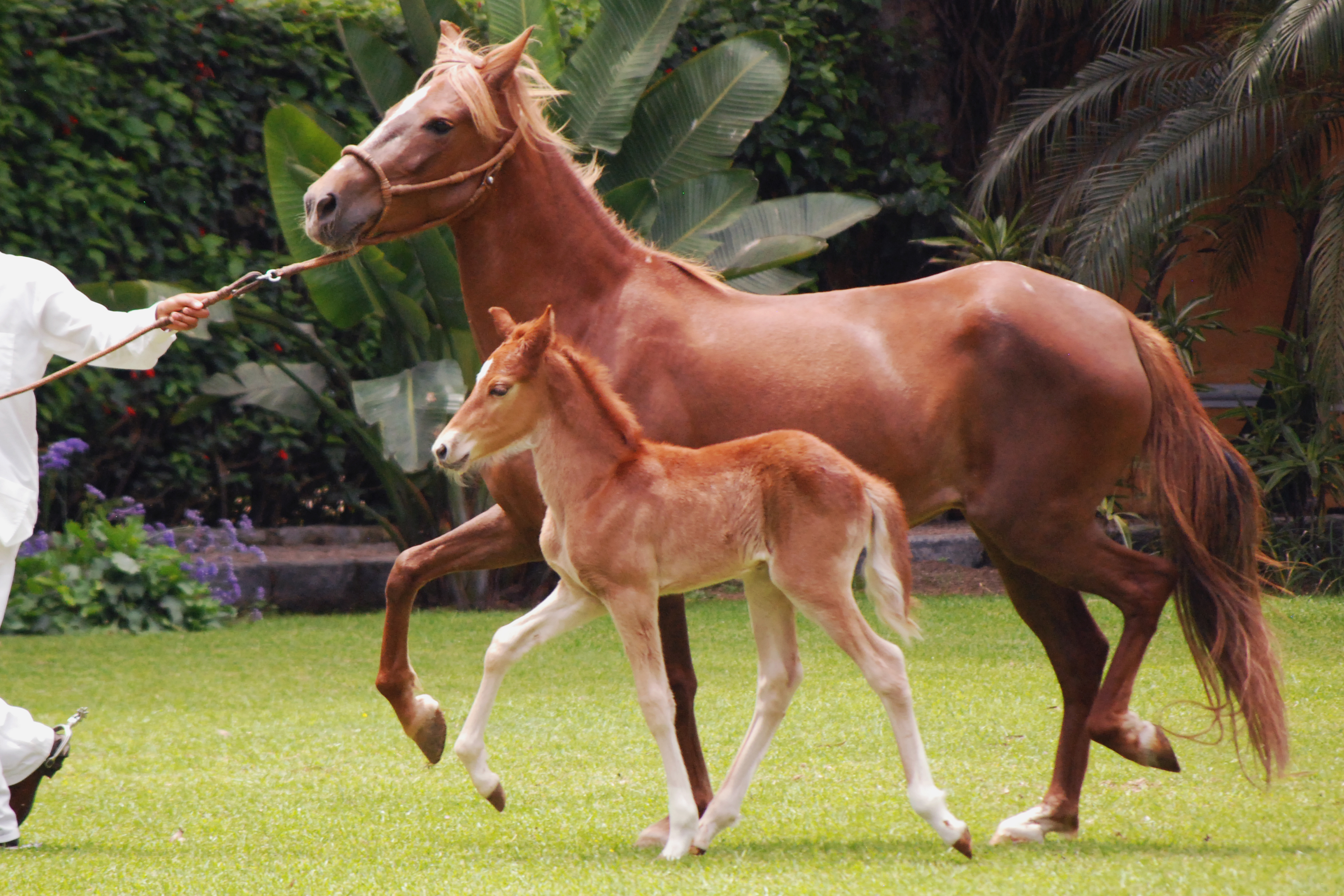
The gaits of the Peruvian Horse are natural, as shown by this foal

=== Appearance ===
The horse is medium-sized, usually standing between 14.1 to 15.2 hands (57 to 62 inches, 145 to 157 cm) tall, with an elegant yet powerful build. The Peruvian horse has a deep chest, heavy neck and body with substance without any trace of being hound gutted in the flank area. A low set, quiet tail, clamped tightly between the buttocks is a vital quality. Stallions have a broader chest and larger neck than mares, and are known for their quality temperament. The coat color can be varied; and is seen in chestnut, black, bay, brown, buckskin, palomino, gray, roan or dun. Solid colors, grays and dark skin are considered the most desirable. The mane and forelock are lustrous, fine and abundant. White markings are acceptable on the legs and face.

=== Gait ===
Instead of a trot, the Peruvian performs an ambling four beat gait between the walk and the trot. There are two official gaits, called the "Paso Llano" or "even step", and the "sobreandando" which is a bit closer in timing to the pace. Both gaits can be performed at a variety of speeds. The fast sobreandando is often the speed of a canter. Both acceptable gaits are lateral, having four beats and is performed in a lateral sequence — left hind, left fore, right hind, right fore. The Peruvian Horse can also canter, will trot and pace at liberty, and do a natural relaxed walk.

The Peruvian performs two variations of the four-beat gait. The first, the paso llano, is isochronous, meaning that there are four equal beats in a 1-2-3-4 rhythm. This is the preferred gait. The second gait, the sobreandando, is often faster. Instead of four equal beats, the lateral beats are closer together in a 1–2, 3-4 rhythm, with the pause between the forefoot of one side to the rear of the other side is longer.

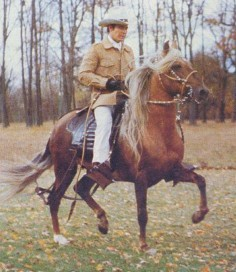
A Peruvian Horse in motion

This characteristic gait was utilized for the purpose of covering long distances over a short period of time without tiring the horse or rider. The gait is natural and does not require extensive training. Purebred Peruvian foals can be seen gaiting alongside their dams within a few hours of their birth.

The gait supplies essentially none of the vertical bounce that is characteristic of the trot, and hence posting (moving up and down with each of the horse's footfalls) is unnecessary. It is also very stable, as the execution of the gait means there are always two, and sometimes three, feet on the ground.

==== Termino ====
A unique trait of the Peruvian gait is termino — an outward swinging leg action, originating from the shoulder, in which the front lower legs roll to the outside during the stride forward, similar to a swimmer's arms. Individual horses may have more or less termino. High lift or wide termino is not necessarily a sign of a well gaited horse; in fact it may be detrimental to a good gait.

=== Brío ===
Brío refers to a horse's vigor, energy, exuberance, courage and liveliness; it automatically implies that these qualities are willingly placed in the service of the rider. Horses with true brio are willing workers. Their attention does not wander but is focused on the handler or rider, and thus they are quick to react and fast to learn. Horses with brio attract attention, and combined with the stamina of the breed have reserves they can tap to travel long distances for many hours.

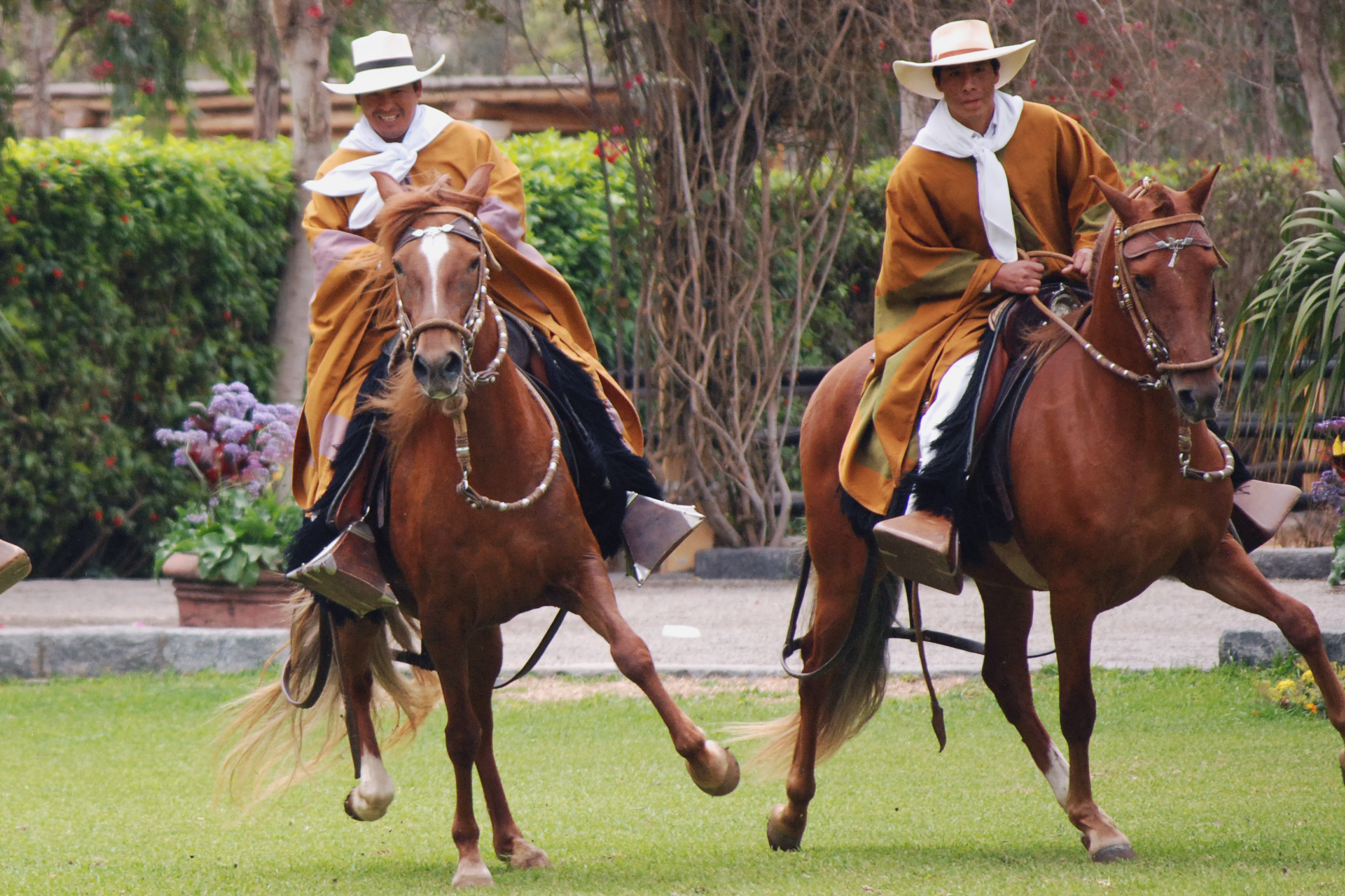
Peruvians showing their gait

== Peruvian Horse shows ==
The two best-known and most important events are The National Horse Competition Caballo de Paso Peruano held in Pachacamac and at the Internacional de la Primavera during the months of September and October in Trujillo city and during the international Marinera Festival in January. The Marinera is also a dance, typically between a man and a woman and specialized forms of the Marinera involves dancing alongside the Peruvian Paso horse. Peru's National Institute of Culture has declared that the horses are part of Peru's national cultural heritage.

== Name ==
Because of the shared word Paso, a close relationship between the Peruvian and the Paso Fino breed is incorrectly assumed. "Paso" simply means "step," in Spanish, and does not imply a common breed or origin. Although the two breeds share ancestors in the Old World, and have some similarities, they were developed independently for different purposes. The two breeds are different and easily distinguishable. The Peruvian is somewhat larger, deeper in the body and wider. The Paso Fino is not bred for "termino" in its stride.

== See also ==
- Association of Breeders and Owners of Paso Horses in La Libertad
- Competition of Paso Horses in Trujillo
