= Competition of Paso Horses in Trujillo =

Peruvian horse contest

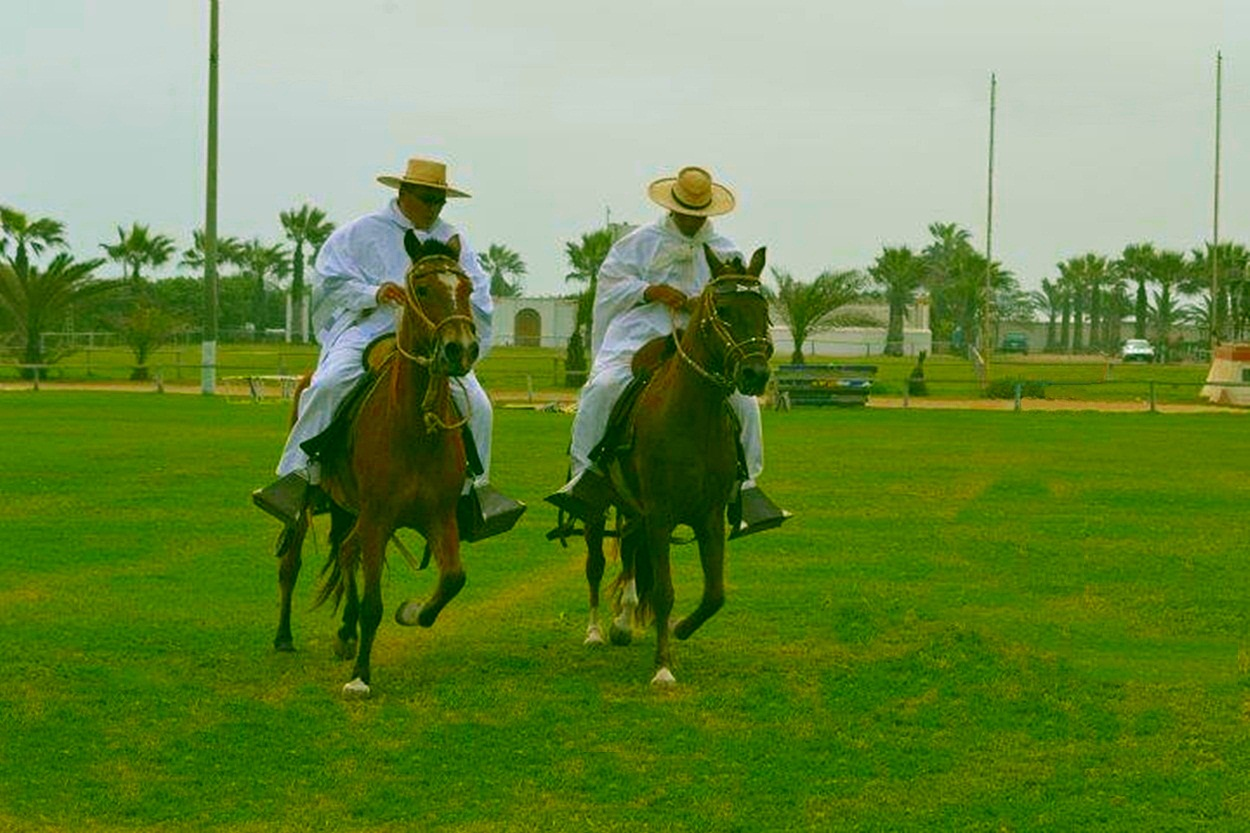
- Chalanes Trujillanos riding in Paso Horses in Víctor Larco District
- Genre: Costumbrist Festival
- Frequency: annual
- Locations: Trujillo city, Peru

Competition of Paso Horses in Trujillo is a contest held in Trujillo city located at northern Peru. These competitions organized by the Association of Breeders and Owners of Paso Horses in La Libertad have as principal participants to the traditional Chalanes (riders) and Peruvian Paso horses in the city are celebrated annually. The care and training of Paso horses in this place is a very old tradition. Trujillo is known and considered as the Cradle of the typical Peruvian Paso Horse as well as the Capital of Culture of Peru so as the Capital of the Marinera dance, which is one of the most important cultural symbols in Peru.

== Organization ==
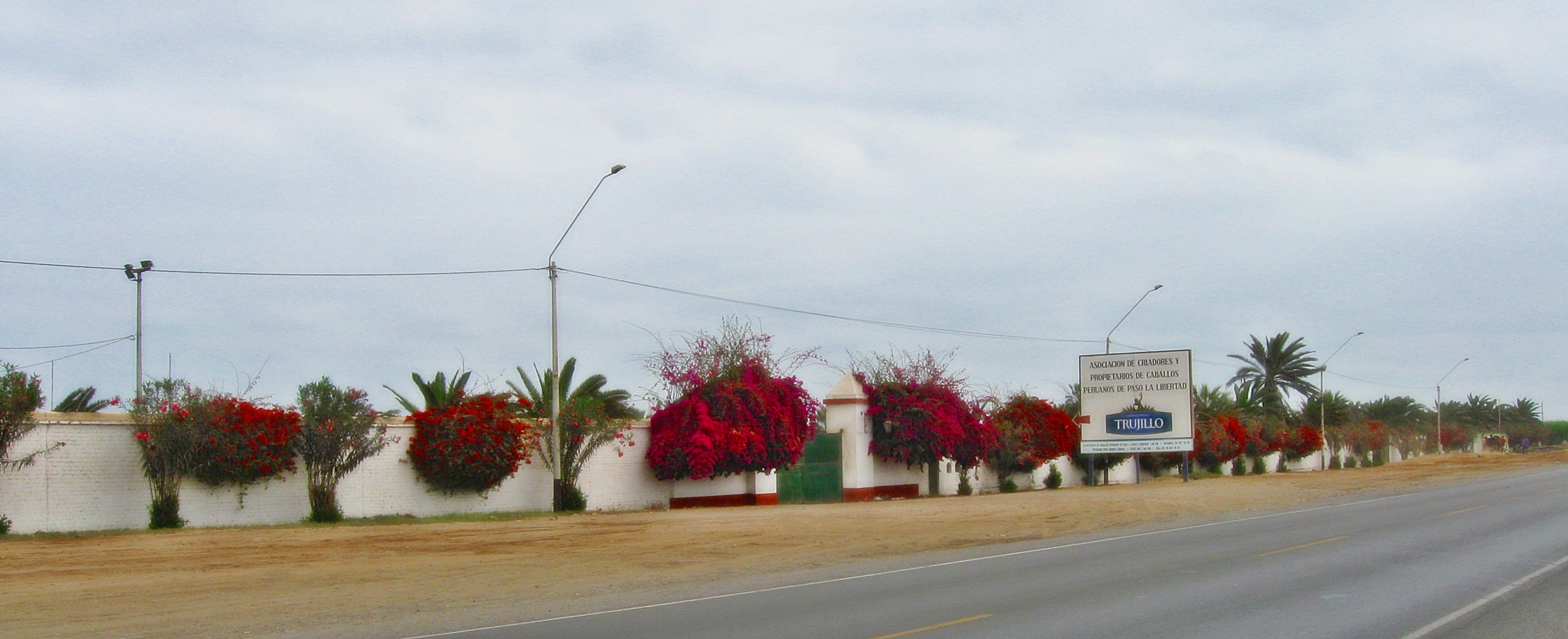
Association of Breeders and Owners of Paso Horses in La Libertad located in Victor Larco Herrera District in west of Trujillo city

In the city the contests of Paso Horses are organized by the Association of Breeders and Owners of Paso Horses in La Libertad, the best known and most important are The National Competition Paso Horses being done within the framework of the International Spring Festival made between September and October and in the Festival and International Competition of Marinera in January. Peruvian government has declared this kind of horses as Nation's cultural heritage.

== Principal competitions ==
=== Peruvian paso in Marinera festival ===
This competition is held during the Trujillo Marinera Festival in January of every year.

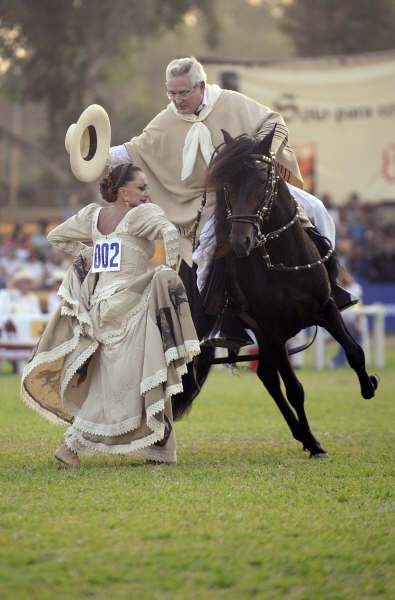
Peruvian Paso dancing marinera.

=== Peruvian Paso in Spring festival ===
During Trujillo Spring Festival in September and October of every year is celebrated a Peruvian Paso contest with the presence of horses from several regions of Peru.

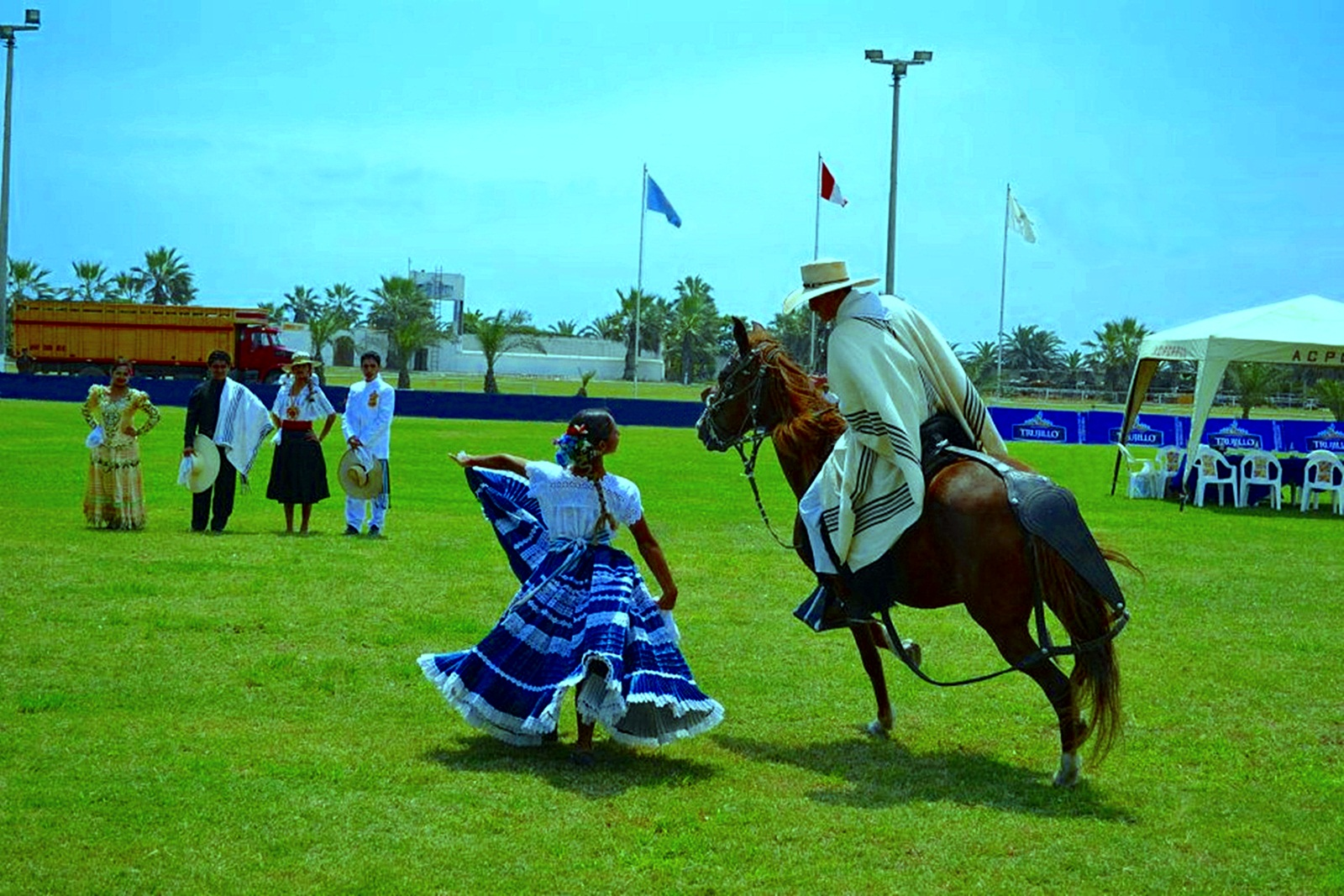
A Chalan in a Paso horse dancing marinera with a lady

== Gallery ==
Peruvian Paso horses
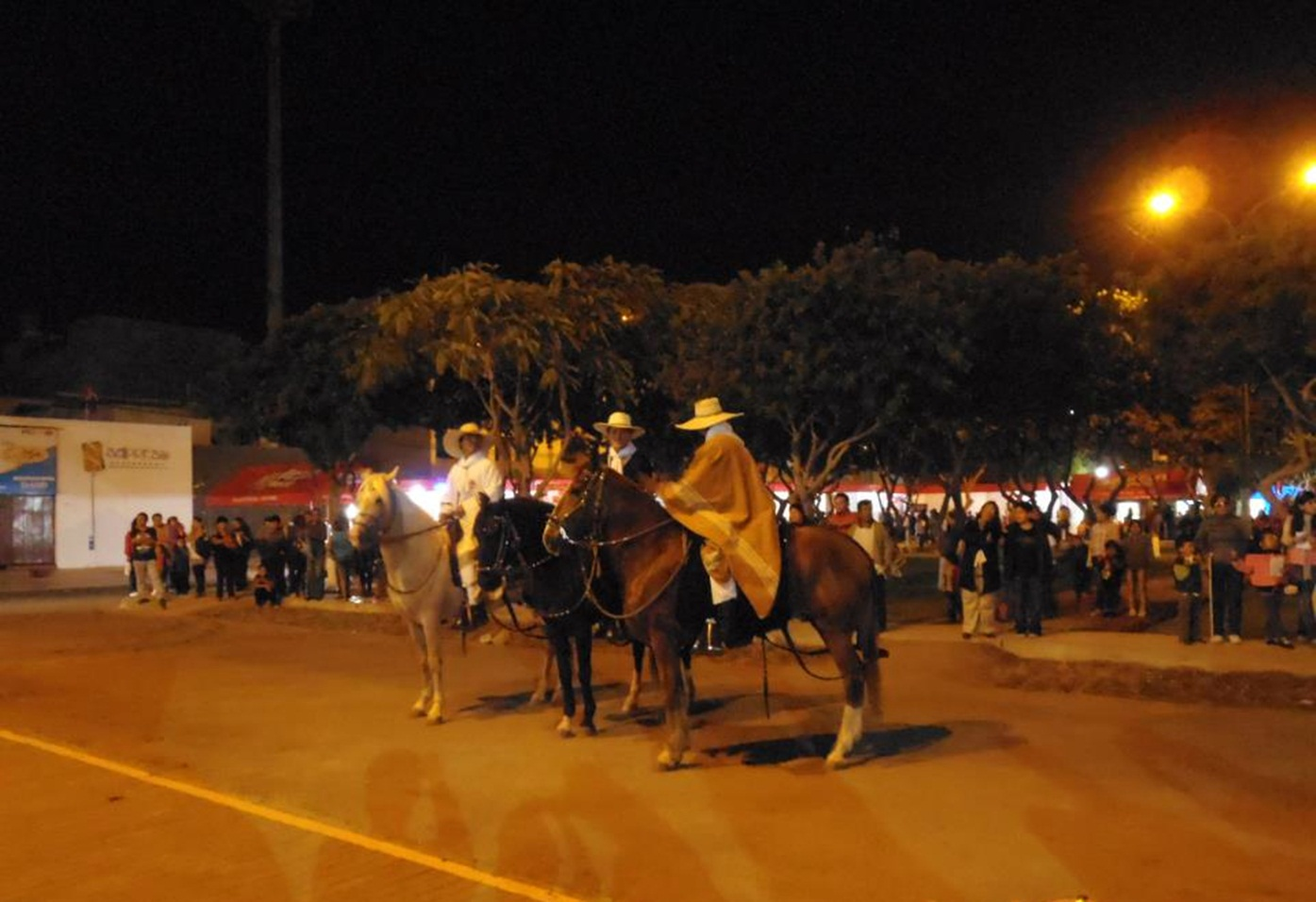
Peruvian Paso at night

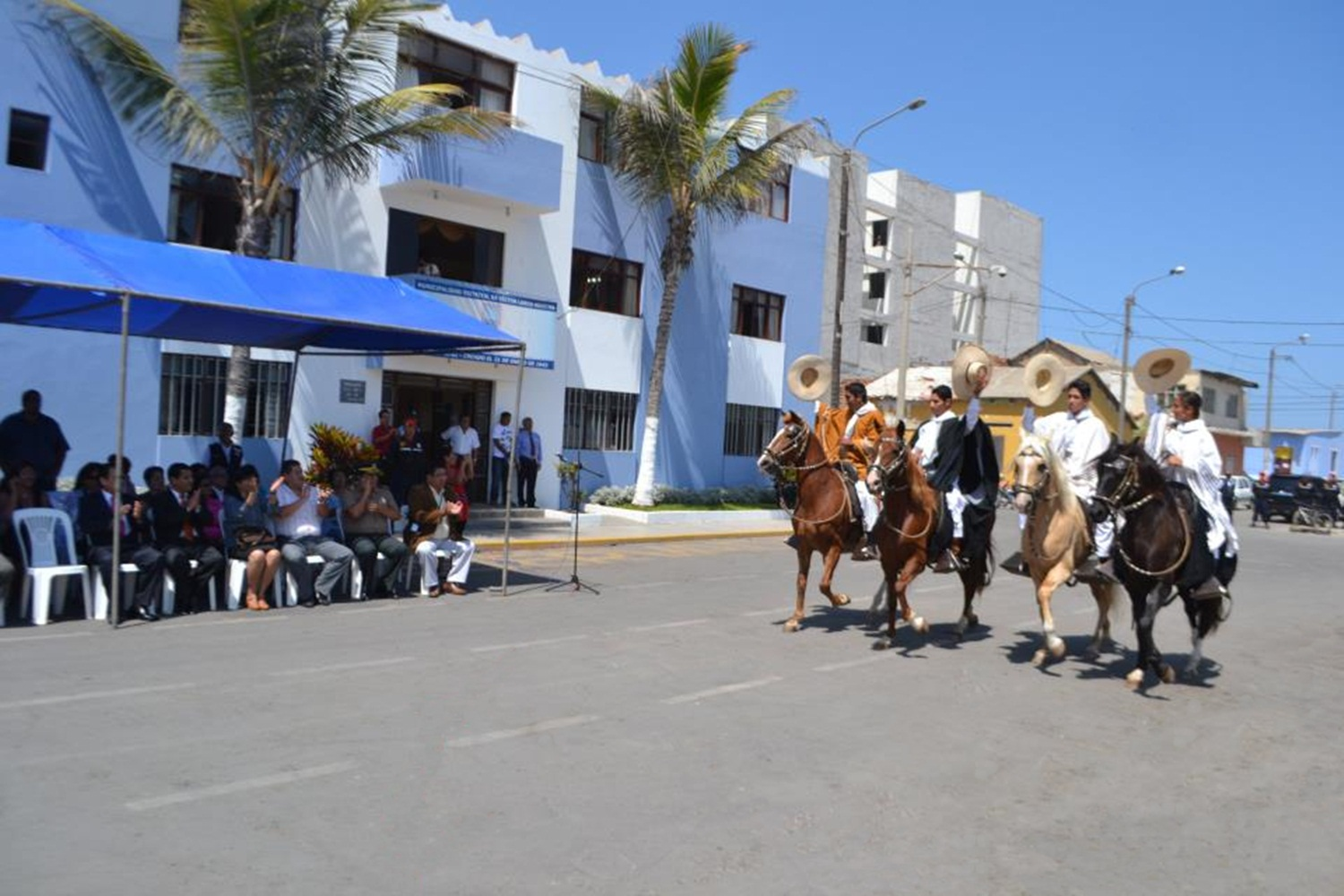
Peruvian Paso in a parade in Victor Larco District.

== See also ==
- San Jose Festival
- Trujillo Book Festival
- International Festival of Lyric Singing
- Trujillo
- Santiago de Huamán
- Victor Larco Herrera District
