= Palfrey =

Riding horse valued in the Middle Ages

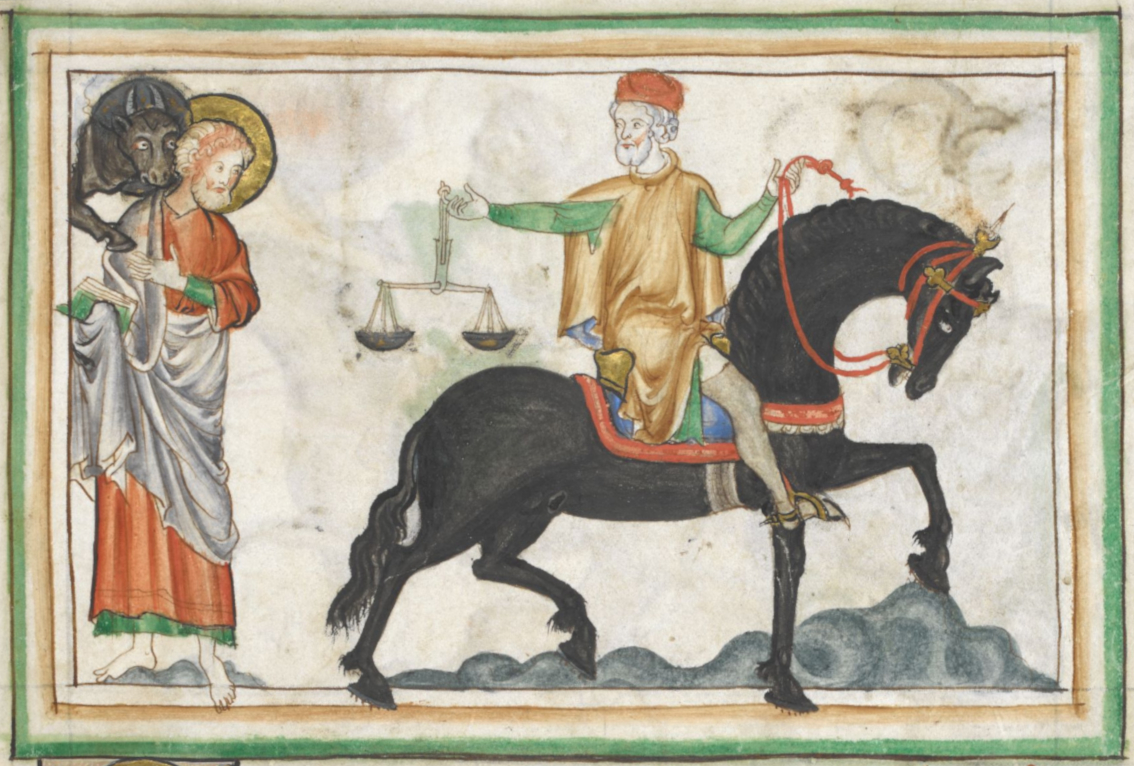
A medieval painting of a palfrey

A palfrey is a type of horse that was highly valued as a riding horse in the Middle Ages. It was a lighter-weight horse, usually a smooth gaited one that could amble, suitable for riding over long distances. Palfreys were not a specific breed as horse breeds are understood today.

== Etymology ==
The word "palfrey" is cognate with Pferd (German for 'horse' of any type); both words descend from paraveredus (Latin for 'post horse' / 'courier horse'), itself deriving from Gaulish vorēdos.

Meanwhile, the German term for a palfrey is Zelter (lit. 'ambler'), cognate with Icelandic tölt.

== Breeding ==
A palfrey usually was the most expensive and highly bred type of riding horse during the Middle Ages, sometimes equalling the knight's destrier in price. Consequently, it was popular with nobles, ladies, and highly ranked knights for riding, hunting, and ceremonial use. Knights would ride palfreys to battle so that their heavier warhorses wouldn't be fatigued during combat.

== Gait ==
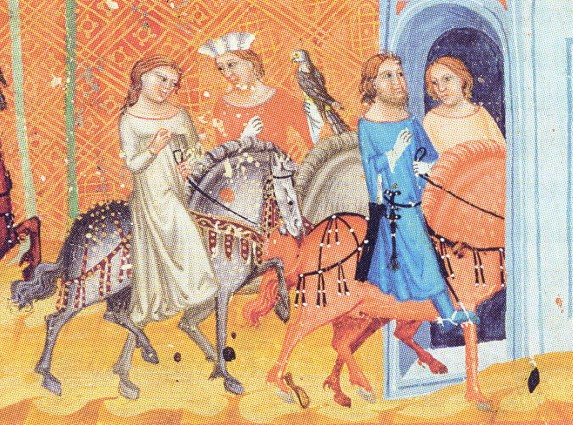
The palfrey was considered an appropriate mount for women

The significant characteristic of the palfrey was that, rather than trotting, it usually possessed a smooth, ambling gait. The amble was the name given to a group of smooth, four-beat gaits faster than a walk, but slower than a canter or gallop. The trot is a two-beat gait, about 8 mph, suitable for covering a lot of ground relatively quickly. However, the horse also has a bit of a spring in its motion as it switches diagonal pairs of legs with each beat, and thus can be rough for a rider, and the trot also jostles about packs or weaponry to a considerable degree. The amble is about as fast as the trot, not tiring for a horse that performs it naturally, and much smoother for the rider. Thus, because much ground transportation in the Middle Ages was on horseback, with long distances to be covered, a smooth-gaited horse was much desired.

An amble is achieved by the horse when it moves with a four-step rhythm, either derived from the two-beat lateral gait known as the pace or from the diagonal trot, with the two beats broken up so there are four. There are several variations, but most either have a lateral sequence of footfalls (left hind, left front, right hind, right front), or a diagonal sequence (left hind, right front, right hind, left front). In either case, only one foot is all the way off the ground at a time. Such a gait can be maintained for long distances, and sometimes at considerable speed. Modern genetic studies have verified that ambling ability is linked to a specific genetic mechanism.

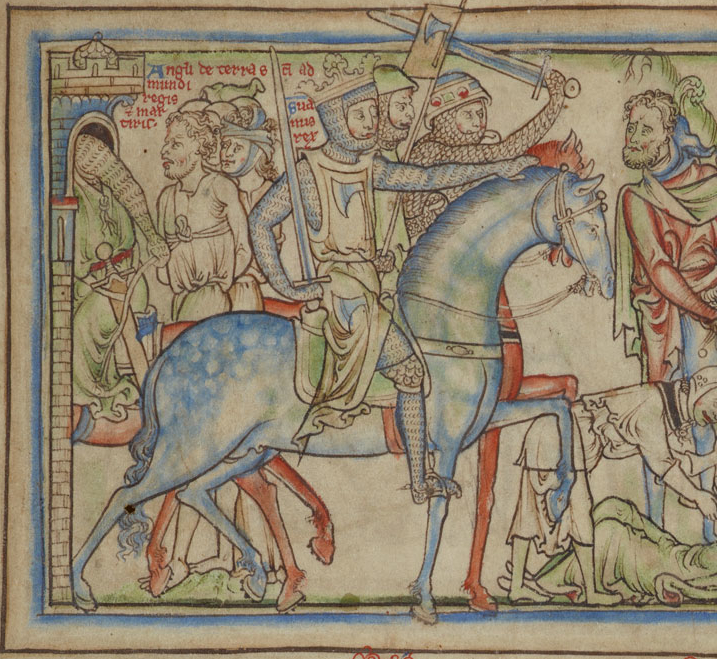
Image of a palfrey in ambling gait

Ambling horses are now uncommon in Europe. They were effectively replaced by trotting horses for several reasons: The first was that as roads improved, travel by carriage became more common, and trotting horse breeds were generally larger and stronger, more suited to the job at hand. Another reason was the rise of the Thoroughbred and other breeds developed for horse racing and for light cavalry, both of which required horses able to gallop for substantial periods of time. Breeds swift at the gallop also tend to trot rather than pace or amble. In the Americas, ambling horses continued to be bred, both in the southern United States and in Latin America.

The smooth ambling gaits today have many names, including the single-foot, the stepping pace, the tolt, the rack, the paso corto, and the fox trot (see ambling). There are still many ambling breeds, particularly in North America where today they are referred to as gaited horses. Some of these breeds include the Missouri Fox Trotter, Tennessee Walking Horse, Icelandic horse and a sub-group within the American Saddlebred. The Paso Fino and the Peruvian Paso, breeds developed in Latin America, perform two or three different ambling gaits of varying speed, and are probably the closest modern descendants of the medieval palfrey.

== See also ==
- Jennet
