= Hacienda Higuereta =

Hacienda in Peru

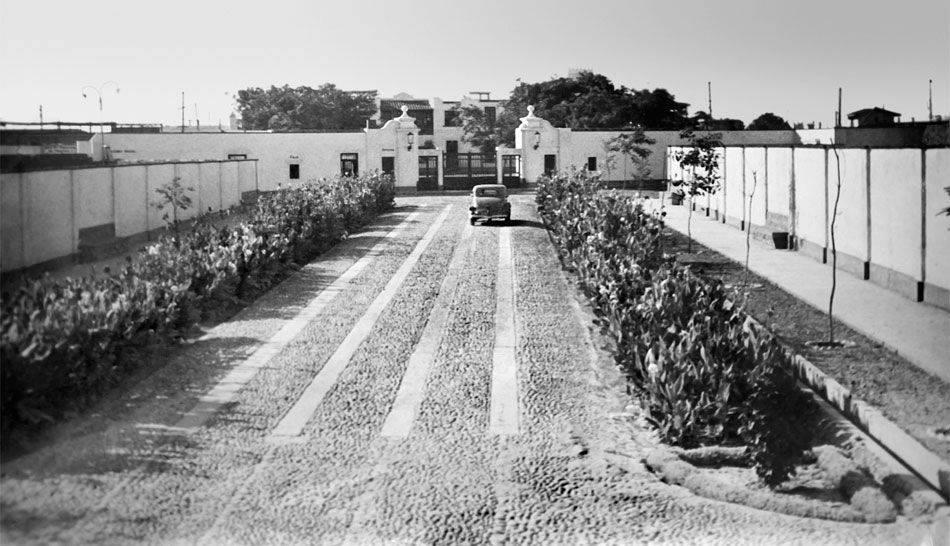
- The hacienda's entrance
- Town/City: Lima, Peru
- Established: 1896
- Disestablished: 1961
- Owner: Pedro Venturo Zapata
- Status: Demolished

The Hacienda Higuereta was an agricultural estate located in Lima, Peru. Its origins dated back to the Spanish period, and it was owned by the Venturo family from 1896 to 1961, after which it was disestablished and its extensive former terrains were urbanised. A house continues to exist as the hacienda's only remnant, located in Santiago de Surco.

== History ==
The agrigultural estates known as Higuereta and Vista Alegre were located in Santiago de Surco. The former was named after the area's prosperous fruit-growing industry. Throughout their history, they were owned by several people, including the Mercedarians and the Count of Montecarmelo (Manuel Martínez de Aparicio), being finally acquired by Pedro Venturo Toledo, an italian immigrant to Peru.

His son, Pedro Venturo inherited the estate in 1925 and increased its agricultural and viticultural activity. As an estate for livestock, it also became known for its milking and for being a breeding site for the Peruvian Paso. Also produced in the estate were pisco, Brandy, Cognac, Champagne, red and white wine (Albilla Superior, Oporto, Moscato Dulce), Vermouth and other products such as balsamic vinegar, Grape Juice and Martini. He also raised livestock finance, with over 300 holstein cows, 2 bulls named Ambrosio and Churchill, chickens, turkeys and pigs. During this period, it was administered as the "Hacienda Higuereta y Anexos - Negociacion Vinicola Pedro Venturo S.A." Venturo served as the company's CEO from 1925 to 1952.

Ventura was an honorary member of various labor organizations and he improved living conditions and planned social assistance, according to modern trends in his estate, building houses for workers and employees; endowing the negotiation of sports fields, and a venue for film shows. It was in some ways a small town with homes for the employees and their families, a school, a movie theater with mezzanine for trusted employees, a park, a wood shed, a machine shop a pool, soccer fields, a chapel, a bodega, public restrooms and of course the buildings where the wine and pisco were crushed, distilled and aged.

Venturo worked with organizations to provide the population with the abundant food and elements of sports and healthy recreation. He was a member of the Wine Committee of the National Agrarian Society and organizer of the Advisory Mission, in 1930, to study the law of alcoholic beverages and promotion of national viticulture. He organized the first Harvest Festival in Peru called "La Vendimia", chairing the Organizing Committee in 1937 in Santiago de Surco. La Vendimia Wine Festival continues today.

On September 23, 1956, two MK-8 Canberra planes belonging to the Air Force's 14th Group collided in the air over San Lorenzo Island. The collision followed both aircraft's participation in an air parade at Las Palmas Air Base and, following a request, were granted permission to land at Limatambo International Airport. The plane flown by captain Javier Elías Vargas and lieutenant Américo Alva Gómez managed to land safely, missing the runway, while the plane flown by captain César Hernán Turcke Podestá and lieutenant Antonio Ravena Ocharán crashed at the estate's grounds, killing both men.

Following Venturo's death in 1952, the company and hacienda were split and sold to different investors. The presidency of Juan Velasco Alvarado saw the introduction of the Peruvian Agrarian Reform, a program to expropriate farms and diversify land ownership, much of which had been concentrated in the estates owned by a small percentage of the population. Under the new law, any estate that was not producing what the quota mandated had to be destroyed. The estate was ordered to be torn down.

The former grounds were eventually urbanised in the 1960s, and only a house remains at Simón Salguero avenue. A mall known as the Centro Comercial Higuereta was built by Supermercados Monterey at a 1.5-hectare (3.7-acre) plot at the intersection of Aviación and Tomás Marsano avenues. Both Monterey and Oechsle served as its anchor stores.

== See also ==
- Deutsche Schule Lima Alexander von Humboldt, located across the street
