= Las Casuarinas, Lima =

Neighbourhood of Lima, Peru

Coordinates: 12°07′11″S 76°58′09″W

Las Casuarinas
- Neighbourhood
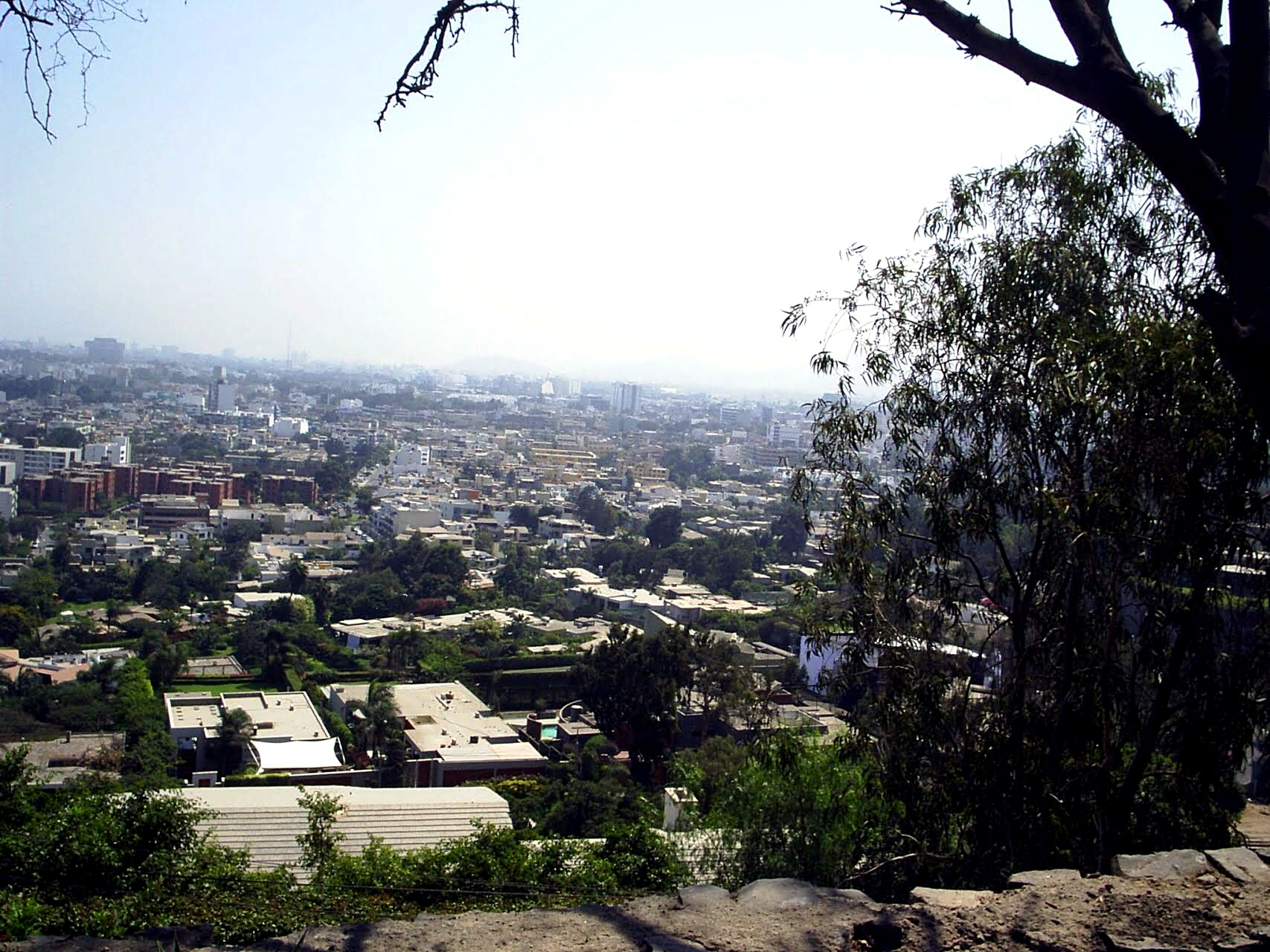
- Interactive map of Las Casuarinas
- Country: Peru
- Department: Lima
- Province: Lima
- District: Santiago de Surco
- Established: 1955
- Time zone: UTC-5 (PET)

Las Casuarinas (pronounced [las kaswaˈɾinas]) is a neighbourhood of Santiago de Surco, Lima, Peru. A gated community, it occupies the lower levels of San Francisco hill, being inhabited by upper-class families and thus considered an exclusive area of the city.

== History ==
The neighbourhood was established in 1955 by married couple Dan Carter and Gisela Zapff Dammert, who created the Compañía Urbanizadora Las Casuarinas de Monterrico S.A., named after the trees of the same name located in the area. Las Casuarinas has its own Futsal facilities and team.

During the 1980s, the neighbourhood became wrongly known for a so-called "Wall of Shame", a barrier that separated another district's (La Molina) side of the hill with the opposite site in Villa María del Triunfo, where shanty towns began to be built. After four decades, parts of the wall were demolished there.

== See also ==
- Chacarilla del Estanque
- Santiago de Surco
