= Westside Grovely FC =

- Full name: Westside Grovely Football Club
- Nickname: Westside
- Short name: WGFC
- Founded: 1964
- Stadium: Grovely Sports Ground
- Capacity: 500
- President: Paul Anson
- Head coach: Stewart Bola
- League: FQPL 5 − Metro
- 2025: 3rd
- Website: https://wgfc.com.au
Home colours

Westside Grovely FC is a football (soccer) club based in the locality of Grovely, Queensland, Australia. The club currently has Men's teams in the Football Queensland Premier League 5, and Football Queensland Metro competitions, as well as a Metro league Women's team. The club also has junior teams for all ages, and Masters team for overage players (Women's Over 30s, Men's Over 35s & 45s).

== History ==
The club was established in 1964 as Budapest Grovely Soccer Club, playing at the sports ground in Hanran Street, Grovely (now part of the suburb Keperra). The club was renamed 'Grovely Soccer Club' in 1973, after the Queensland Soccer Federation banned the use of ethnic-based club names, and then renamed 'Westside Soccer Club' in 1978.

The club initially played in Brisbane's Division 2 for several years (tier 2 of the Brisbane competition), but from the mid-1970s and during the 1980s, the senior club's fortunes declined. The senior club became inactive after the 1988 season but was revived in 2006, reentering the Football Brisbane competition in Metro 3 (then tier 7). The club slowly progressed up the Metro leagues and began offering additional teams for senior players.

Westside finished second in the 2012 Brisbane Metro 1 season, the highest place of any non-Premier League team in the competition.

The club celebrated its 50th season in 2013, which saw the senior men's team compete in a new league structure introduced by Football Brisbane, taking its place Capital League 3. Led by Michael Gooda & Bill Faust, Westside finished in 2nd place behind Centenary Stormers, who they eliminated from the finals in the preliminary final. The 2013 Capital League 3 Grand Final represents the most successful finals campaign for the Men's team in recent times, which was capped by a Grand Final victory, beating New Farm 4–2 on penalties following a scoreless draw. The season also represented the highest points tally recorded by the Men's first team, registering 50 points from 22 matches.

Further re-structuring of the Football Brisbane league system has resulted in Westside Grovely participating in Capital League 2. In 2019, the club achieved its highest finish to date, coming third and narrowly missing out on promotion to Capital League 1.

Another restructure of the football pyramid in Queensland was conducted in late 2021, with Westside Grovely confirmed a place in FQPL 5 for the 2022 season. Mauricio Mota was appointed Head Coach following the departure of Terry Campbell.

In 2024, the playing fields (Field 1 & 2) at Grovely Sports Ground were upgraded as part of a project with the Brisbane City Council and Queensland State Government. This came off the back of increased maintenance and facility improvements made by the club committee and volunteers.

The club has prioritised the progression of the junior pathway to senior football, and as part of this, increased the level of support and training available for coaches and players alike, with the introduction of a Director of Football, and Junior Director of Coaching.

Part of this progression and forward planning is to expand the offering for female inclusion. The club is continuing to grow the number of senior female teams, and encourages female participation at all junior age groups.

In 2026, with the support of Queensland State Government and Brisbane City Council, Grovely Sports Ground will see a new clubhouse opened to support the growth plans of the club.
