= Facing Mount Kenya =

Book by Jomo Kenyatta

- Author: Jomo Kenyatta
- Language: English
- Genre: Nonfiction, anthropology
- Publisher: Secker and Warburg (London)
- Publication date: 1938
- Publication place: Kenya
- Media type: Print (Paperback)
- Pages: 339

Facing Mount Kenya, first published in 1938, is an anthropological study of the Kikuyu people of Central Kenya. It was written by native Kikuyu and future Kenyan president Jomo Kenyatta. Kenyatta writes in this text, "The cultural and historical traditions of the Gikuyu people have been verbally handed down from generation to generation. As a Gikuyu myself, I have carried them in my head for many years, since people who have no written records to rely on learn to make a retentive memory do the work of libraries."

The book's introduction was written by anthropologist Bronisław Malinowski, who mentored Kenyatta while both were at the London School of Economics. Malinowski wrote, 'As a first-hand account of a representative African culture, as an invaluable document in the principles underlying culture-contact and change and as a personal statement of the new outlook of a progressive African, this book will rank as a pioneering achievement of outstanding merit.'

The book was banned in Ireland.

== Book sections ==
- Tribal Origin and Kinship System
- The Gikuyu System of Land Tenure
- Economic Life
- Industries
- System of Education
- Initiation of Boys and Girls
- Sex Life among Young People
- Marriage System
- The Gikuyu System of Government
- The Agikuyu belief system.
- Religion and Ancestor Worship
- The New Religion in Eastern Africa
- Magical and Medical Practices
- Conclusion
