= Grace Wahu =

Former Kenyan First Lady

Grace Wahu Kenyatta (1897 – 4 April 2007) was the first wife of Jomo Kenyatta, the first president of Kenya. Records indicate that Wahu married Kenyatta, then known as Johnstone Kamau, around 1917 or 1919. She had two children with Jomo Kenyatta: Peter Muigai Kenyatta (1922–1979) and Margaret Wambui Kenyatta (1928–2017). Grace Wahu died on 4 April 2007, aged 110.
