= Margaret Kenyatta (mayor) =

Kenyan politician

Ambassador Margaret Wambui Kenyatta, CBS

27th Mayor of Nairobi
- In office 1970–1976
- Preceded by: Isaac Lugonzo
- Succeeded by: Andrew Ngumba

Personal details
- Born: 16 February 1928 Nairobi, Kenya Colony
- Died: 5 April 2017 (aged 89) Nairobi, Kenya
- Parents: Jomo Kenyatta (father); Grace Wahu (mother)

Margaret Wambui Kenyatta (16 February 1928 – 5 April 2017) was a Kenyan politician. She was the daughter of the first President of Kenya, Jomo Kenyatta, and his wife Grace Wahu. She served as the mayor of Nairobi from 1970 to 1976 and as Kenya's Permanent Representative to the United Nations from 1976 to 1986. She was thereafter appointed as a Commissioner with the Electoral Commission of Kenya from 1992 to 2002.

== Early life ==
Margaret Kenyatta was born in Pumwani Maternity Hospital in the Kenyan capital Nairobi, to Jomo Kenyatta, a Kenyan politician who later became Kenya's first president, and his first wife Grace Wahu. She was one of two children born to Kenyatta and Wahu, after elder brother Peter Muigai.

By the time Margaret was born, her father was already a political activist. He was the Secretary General of the Kikuyu Central Association (KCA) that had been formed to fight for the return of African lands that had been forcefully taken by the colonialists. In 1929, when she was barely a year old, her father left for England to represent KCA in these discussions. He returned home the following year but returned in 1931 to England and Russia for further studies.

With her father away, Margaret grew up and lived with her mother and her older brother Peter in their family home in Gichungo near Dagoretti Children's Centre in Nairobi. As was the custom in those days, Margaret helped her mother in day-to-day chores of their home. She was an obedient, extremely neat and a very inquisitive child who asked her mother many questions about her father and why he had left and gone to England. Even before she started school, she had developed a sharp mind and had started to become aware of the colonial injustices of the time.

== Education ==
In those days, few children went to school early, therefore Margaret only started her formal schooling at Ruthimitu Primary School when she was over ten years old. She later attended the Church of Scotland Mission School at Thogoto, Kikuyu, where, true to her natural leadership skills, she became one of the prefects of the girls' section.

Margaret passed the primary-school leaving-examinations with flying colours and the examination officials had a serious challenge over what to do with her and another girl, Joan Wambui Gitau, who had also passed well, with respect to high school studies. The dilemma was that there was no high school for African girls at the time. However, due to their strong academic performance, the Principal of the then Alliance High School Kikuyu had no option but to accept the girls to join the school.

Margaret was therefore the first girl to enroll at Alliance in 1948 with admission number ‘1000’. This number was given to her to distinguish her admission to the school as the first girl, since admission number ‘1’ had been given to her uncle James Muigai when he had joined the same school twenty years earlier.

Margaret and Joan became lasting role-models to girls during their two years at Alliance. This continued even after they went in different directions after sitting for the Kenya Certificate of Secondary Schools Examination in 1949 and passing well; Margaret going on to teach at the Kenya Teachers’ Training College at Githunguri, Kiambu, and Joan to study at Makerere University in Kampala, Uganda.

== Teaching life ==
From 1949 to 1952, Margaret taught at the Kenya Teachers’ Training College at Githunguri, Kiambu, where her father had become the Principal in 1946 after returning from England. It is noteworthy that Margaret taught without any salary. She stopped teaching when the African Independent Schools were closed by the colonial government after a State of Emergency was declared in Kenya in 1952.

It was while teaching at Githunguri that Margaret's political consciousness was awakened because she was constantly in contact with those at the forefront of the freedom struggle. She spent a lot of time with her father, who instilled in her the spirit of fighting for African rights, and made a decision to be part of the freedom struggle by supporting her father and those who were at the forefront of the freedom struggle.

== State of emergency and early working life ==
When her father was arrested and jailed on 20 October 1952 after the declaration of the state of emergency, Margaret was the source of information for her father through the numerous personal letters that she wrote to him. Because letters were censored, the content of the letters was mainly news of the family. He also wrote her letters including stories of what was happening in Lokitaung to the Drum magazine, which supported Kenya's independence struggle at the time.

Margaret also visited her father in Maralal, which involved tiring and hazardous journeys on the back of a truck for several days. During her father's trial in Kapenguria, she assisted the lawyers in preparing and signing the necessary legal documents. She also arranged for him to obtain the vital vitamin tablets and medication for eczema he required as well as the necessary doctors to attend to his health during his detention.

While her father and elder brother Peter Muigai were in detention, the responsibility of providing for the families they left behind fell on her and she had to seek employment to provide for them. Margaret came back to Nairobi to search for employment and stayed at House No. 27 of Kariokor Estate, from where she managed to make occasional visits to her mother and young son in Dagoretti despite the severe travel restrictions then in place in Nairobi.

Margaret managed to secure employment in various jobs between the years 1953 and 1960; as a telephone operator at the East Africa Bata Shoe Company, later as a junior accounts clerk, and also as a book binder in a publishing firm owned by the renowned Asian nationalist Mr. Ambu H. Patel, who supported the freedom movement. Mr. Patel allowed her to travel several times to visit her father while he was in detention.

Margaret also joined and played an active role in a number of social welfare organisations dealing with women and general matters during this period. While she was employed, she went by the name Margaret Kamau to conceal the fact that she was the daughter of Jomo Kenyatta due to the inherent dangers of an association with that name during the Emergency period.

When Mzee Kenyatta was released in August 1961, Margaret became his secretary and close confidant, always standing by his side and taking notes whenever he addressed the press.

== Early political life ==
Margaret's political life was awakened at an early stage when her father came back to Kenya from England in 1946. She saw how her father related with people and explained to them the meaning of freedom. He toured the country with her, attending the various political meetings he held in different parts of Kenya.

When the Peoples Convention Party was formed in 1956, it was natural that she became a member of the party as it was the most active political party during the period of the State of Emergency that was fighting for the African rights and the release of political detainees.

Margaret thereafter joined the Kenya African National Union (KANU) when it was formed in 1960, working at the Kiambu Branch as its first Assistant Secretary and later as the Secretary of the Branch until 1962. She was also active in the KANU Women's Wing at both the branch and national level and became a County Councillor in Kiambu during that period.

She travelled extensively overseas and visited countries in Africa, Europe, Asia and America, which travels also included visits to the then U.S.S.R (now the Russian Federation) and the People's Republic of China promoting the Kenyan freedom cause. She was also a member of various Party and Government delegations to other countries, including to the United Nations.

== Women's advocacy ==
Margaret was very passionate about women's issues. She was committed to improving the lives of women, especially their rights and increasing their voice to be heard, and was deeply involved in the movement to find the rightful role of women in an independent state.

In 1962, Margaret became the Chairlady of the Kenya Women Seminar, and, together with prominent East African women including Bibi Titi Mohamed of Tanganyika (now Tanzania) and Pumla Kisosonkole of Uganda, was among the convenors of the East African Women Seminars in 1962 and 1963. These seminars brought together East African women leaders to discuss their role as women in the economic and political development of their young nations.

She was actively involved in the national women's associations of the day, including Maendeleo ya Wanawake and the National Council of Women of Kenya, and utilized her contacts with international movements such as Countrywomen of the World, International Council of Women, Women Presbyterians of Canada, and the Young Women's Christian Association (YWCA). These organizations united women of different races and religious inclinations to combine their efforts to advance the cause of girls and women.

In 1964, she became the president of the National Council of Women of Kenya and began to travel widely, addressing conferences and seminars throughout the world on women's roles in nation-building. She attended Women's International Conferences in Vienna in 1962, Washington in 1963, Israel in 1964 and London in 1965.

Speaking to groups in Europe, Asia, America, the U.S.S.R., the People's Republic of China and India, her message always emphasized the importance of the home and children, and the place of education in building a solid future. In 1964, in recognition of her efforts, she was awarded the Order of the Queen of Sheba by Emperor Haile Selassie of Ethiopia.

She continued her efforts to unify women in a quest for equality and was a great inspiration to girls and women, insisting that girls needed to get an education in order to assume leadership in independent Kenya.

Margaret's strident defence and support of women's empowerment was also evidenced when she was appointed by President Jomo Kenyatta in 1967 as a member of the Commission on the Law of Marriage and Divorce to consider the existing laws relating to marriage and divorce in Kenya and to make recommendations for a new law providing a comprehensive and uniform law of marriage and divorce applicable to all persons in Kenya, paying particular attention to the status of women in relation to marriage and divorce in a free democratic society.

== Nairobi City Council and Mayor of Nairobi ==
Margaret was elected as a Councillor for Dagoretti Ward in Nairobi in 1963 and was subsequently re-elected for four subsequent terms.

During her tenure as a Councillor the Nairobi City Council, she played a prominent role in the administration of public health in the city. She was the Chairlady of the Pumwani Maternity Hospital Sub-committee during the reconstruction and extension of the Hospital and also a Chairwoman of the Public Health Committee.

Margaret was elected as the deputy Mayor of Nairobi in 1969 and as the Mayor of Nairobi for two terms from 1970 to 1976, thus becoming the first African woman to become the mayor of Kenya's capital city and the second African woman mayor in Kenya.

Her tenure in office was marked by the adoption of high standards that uplifted Nairobi into one of the leading cities in the world through the implementation of many developmental programs including the construction of the Jamuhuri, California, Kariobangi South, Buru Buru and Madaraka housing estates, the first housing estates of their kind in East Africa. She also oversaw the expansion of the roads and sewerage services and public health facilities. It was evidence of these high standards that tap water in Nairobi was among the cleanest water that could be drunk in the world during that period.

Margaret's first priorities during her tenure as Mayor, however, remained women, children, and education, which she viewed as the hope for Kenya's future. Her tenure is remembered with nostalgia for her exceptional leadership, especially in her willingness to uplift other women, mentor them and to travel widely to inspire girls in schools. She would lend her powerful voice to all decisions affecting the empowerment of girls and women. In 1972 she visited Austria and convinced the Austrian President to open the SOS Children's Homes in Kenya, which continue to impact many lives of the less privileged in Kenyan society.

== United Nations activities and Permanent Representative to the United Nations Programme on Environment ==
Margaret was involved in various United Nations activities in the 1960s, attending the UNESCO Seminar on Women Education held in Moscow in 1962 and as a Kenyan delegate to the 20th Session of the United Nations in December 1965.

In 1976, Margaret was appointed as Kenya's Permanent Representative to the United Nations Environment Programme (UNEP) and the United Nations Human Settlements Programme (UN-Habitat), where she represented Kenya in the UNEP Governing Council, a position in which she served until 1986. She is remembered for spearheading the fight against desertification in Kenya during her tenure.

In 1985, President Daniel Toroitich arap Moi appointed Margaret as the head of the Kenyan delegation to the United Nations Third World Conference to Review and Appraise the Achievements of the United Nations Decade of Women (1976 – 1986) held in Nairobi in July 1985, which was attended by the then United Nations Secretary-General Javier Pérez de Cuéllar.

The Conference was the culmination of the United Nations Decade for Women: Equality, Development and Peace from 1976 to 1986 and oversaw the adoption of the Nairobi Forward Looking Strategies for the Advancement of Women. 157 Governments were represented at the Nairobi Conference, along with intergovernmental organizations, United Nations bodies and agencies, non-governmental organizations and national liberation movements. More than 80 per cent of the 2,000 delegates were women, and women headed approximately 85 per cent of the delegations.

The Decade's themes—equality, development and peace—and sub-themes—education, health and employment—were reiterated throughout the work of the Conference and provided the outline for its main document, the "Forward-looking strategies of implementation for the advancement of women and concrete measures to overcome obstacles to the achievement of the goals and objectives of the Decade", covering the period from 1986 to 2000.

Margaret was elected by acclamation as the president of the conference, telling the assemblage that the international community must not be overly confident of the successes of the Decade, but must look critically at what remains to be done and devise appropriate ways to resolve outstanding issues. If the Conference were not a success, she stated, it would "let down the world community of women and the international community as a whole".

Margaret also participated as a member of the Kenyan delegation to the United Nations Fourth World Conference on Women: Action for Equality, Development and Peace in Beijing, China, in September 1995. The principal themes of this Conference were the advancement and empowerment of women in relation to women's human rights, women and poverty, women and decision-making, the girl-child, violence against women and other areas of concern, aiming at accelerating the implementation of the Nairobi Forward-Looking Strategies for the Advancement of Women.

== Electoral Commission of Kenya ==
Margaret was appointed as a member of the Electoral Commission of Kenya by President Moi from 1992 to 2002.

During her term as a Commissioner, she was involved in the Commission's activities in the organization of the General Elections in Kenya in 1992, 1997 and 2002, a position in which she served with distinction.

At the end of her tenure as a Commissioner in 2002, she retired from public service to a quiet life.

== Social memberships ==
Margaret was a member of the Green Belt Movement, Young Women's Christian Association (Y.W.C.A.), the Kenya Girl Guide Association, the Kenya Red Cross Society, the National Council of Social Services, HelpAge Kenya and the National Council of Women, of which she was the President for three years. She was also the Chairlady of the Kenyatta National Hospital League of Friends.

Margaret also took a keen interest in education and sat on the Boards of Governors of various educational institutions including the Kiambu Institute of Technology (KIST) from 1971 to 2009 and the Kenya High School from 1977 to 2006.

She was also instrumental in the founding of the Starehe Girls' Centre, a national boarding school in Kenya that offers secondary education to financially disadvantaged girls from all over the country, in January 2005.

=== Girl Guide Movement ===
Margaret joined the Kenya Girl Guide Movement in the early 1940s and became the first warranted African Girl Guide in Kenya in 1949. She was the Chairlady of the Trefoil Senior Girl Guide Guild and member of the National Council for 10 years and gave the keynote speech at the International Federation of Scouts and Girl Guides meeting in Nyeri in 2007 to celebrate 100 years of the Scout movement in Kenya. She was committed to promoting the social values and empowerment of girls and women and supported the Kenya Girl Guides Association in developing suitable programs for the girls, the core of the Guides’ law and Promise.

== Awards and honours ==
In recognition of her contribution to the promotion of environmental awareness, education and development, Margaret was awarded an Honorary Doctorate in Environmental Science by the Kenyatta University at its 10th congregation in 1995.

In 2001, the World Association of Girl Guides and Girl Scouts presented Margaret with an award for ‘Leadership Excellence in Africa’ in Cape Town, South Africa, following her nomination for the award by the African Girl Guide and Girl Scout national associations.

Margaret was also awarded the ‘Freedom of the City’ by the Nairobi City Council in 2006 in recognition of her service to the city of Nairobi as a Councillor and Mayor.

== Family ==
Margaret was the mother to the late Hon. Justice Patrick John Kamau (1951–2005), Judge of the High Court of Kenya.

She was a half-sister to Uhuru Kenyatta, who served as President of Kenya from 2013 to 2022.

== Religion ==
Margaret was a member of the Presbyterian Church of East Africa (PCEA) and was a parishioner at the PCEA St. Andrews Church in Nairobi.

== Death ==
Margaret died at her home in Lavington, Nairobi, on 5 April 2017 at the age of 89.
