= Kenyatta (surname) =

Kenyatta is an East African surname derived from the beaded belt worn by Maasai.

== People with the name ==
- Jomo Kenyatta (c. 1897/98–1978), first Prime Minister and President of Kenya
- Kamau Kenyatta (born 1955), American musician, record producer, arranger, film composer, and jazz educator
- Kwame Kenyatta (1956–2019), American politician
- Malcolm Kenyatta (born 1990), American community activist and politician
- Margaret Kenyatta (born 1964), Kenyan educator and First Lady of Kenya
- Margaret Kenyatta (mayor) (1928–2017), Kenyan politician
- Muhammad Kenyatta (1944–1992), American academic, civil rights leader, and politician
- Muhoho Kenyatta (born 1965), Kenyan businessman
- Ngina Kenyatta (born 1933), First Lady of Kenya
- Nyokabi Kenyatta (born 1963), Kenyan businesswoman and philanthropist
- Robin Kenyatta (1942–2004), American jazz alto saxophonist
- Uhuru Kenyatta (born 1961), fourth President of Kenya

== Fictional characters ==
- Abraham Kenyatta, a character in the television series Zoo

== See also ==
- Kenyatta family
- Kenyatta (given name)
- Kenyatta (disambiguation)
