= Sanga, Uganda =

Sanga
- Location in Uganda; Placement on map is approximate
- Coordinates: 00°29′54″S 30°54′27″E
- Country: Uganda
- Region: Western Region
- District: Kiruhura District
- Municipality: Sanga
- County: Nyabushozi

Government
  - Mayor: Safari Mugyenyi
  - Parliament of Uganda: Fred Mwesigye
- Elevation: 3,996 ft (1,218 m)

Population (2020 Estimate)
  - Total: 11,200

Sanga, is an urban center in the Kiruhura District, Ankole sub-region, in the Western Region of Uganda.

== Geography ==
Sanga is located approximately 36 kilometres (22 mi) east of Mbarara, the largest city in the Ankole sub-region This is approximately 31 kilometres (19 mi), along the Masaka–Mbarara Road, west of Lyantonde, the nearest large town. The geographical coordinates of Sanga, Uganda are 0°29'54.0"S, 30°54'27.0"E (Latitude:-0.498333; Longitude:30.907500). The average elevation of this settlement is 1,218 metres (3,996 ft) above sea level.

== Overview ==
Sanga is immediately outside the northern borders of Lake Mburo National Park. Because of its location on a major highway (Masaka-Mbarara Road), it has developed into a stop-over for buses travelling between Kampala and Masaka to the east and north and Mbarara, Ntungamo, Rukungiri, Kabale, Kisoro, and Kigali to the west and south. Some of the items for sale include fresh milk, roasted meat, cheese, ghee, and charcoal. One of the two main gates into Lake Mburo National Park is located at Sanga.

== Population ==
The Uganda Bureau of Statistics (UBOS) projected the population of Sanga Municipality at 5,200 in 2012. In 2019, the town's population was estimated at 10,000 people, with a sizable proportion from neighboring Burundi, Democratic Republic of the Congo and Rwanda.

In 2015, UBOS estimated the mid-year population of Sanga, Uganda at 9,300 people. In 2020, the statistics agency estimated the mid-year population of the town at 11,200, of whom 5,800 (51.8 percent) were males and 5,400 (48.2 percent) were females. UBOS calculated that the town's population grew at an average annual rate of 3.79 percent, between 2015 and 2020.

== See also ==
- Dairy industry in Uganda
- List of cities and towns in Uganda
- Kiruhura, Uganda
- Kazo, Uganda
- Rushere, Uganda
