= Mulwana =

Mulwana is an Ugandan surname. Notable people with the surname include:

- Barbara Mulwana (born 1965), Ugandan electrical engineer and computer scientist
- James Mulwana (1936–2013), Ugandan businessman
