= Vital Tomosi Dairy Limited =

Dairy processing company in Uganda

Coordinates: 00°12′38″S 30°56′24″E

- Company type: Private
- Industry: Dairy processing
- Founded: 2014; 12 years ago
- Headquarters: Rushere, Uganda
- Key people: Eyal Jones; Managing Director
- Products: UHT milk, yogurt
- Website: Homepage

Vital Tomosi Dairy Limited is a dairy processing company in Uganda. The company is a joint venture between Vital Capital Fund, "an impact investing fund primarily focused on Sub-Saharan Africa", and "Tomosi Dairy Farms, a Ugandan producer of dairy products".

== Location ==
The main office and factory of the company are located in the town of Rushere, Kiruhura District, in the Ankole sub-region of Uganda's Western Region. Rushere is approximately 240 kilometres (149 mi), southwest of Kampala, the capital and largest city in that country. The geographical coordinates of the factory and company are: 0°12'38.0"S, 30°56'24.0"E (Latitude:-0.210556; Longitude:30.940000).

== Overview ==
The company and its factory were set up over a four-year period. As of June 2017, the factory processes 200,000 liters of milk daily, on four production lines, one for yogurt, one for ESL UHT that lasts for 90 days, one for frsh cream and butter and the other for UHT FINO milk.

The factory, which cost $13 million (about USh46.8 billion, at that time) to build, is jointly owned by Vital Capital Fund, an Israel-based private equity firm and Tomosi Dairy Farms of Uganda. The processing plant was commissioned in November 2016 and produces yoghurt and UHT milk under the "Milkman" brand.

A new production line was commissioned on 29 January 2019 by Yoweri Museveni, Uganda's president. With the new production line, capacity at the factory increased to 200,000 liters (43,994 imp gal; 52,834 U.S. gal) daily.

Tomosi's Dairy Farm was established in 1964, by the founders, Mr. and Mrs. Tomosi Rwabwogo. The second generation, Mr Odrek Rwabwogo, began to expand the farm from the original 76 acres (31 ha), to 500 acres (202 ha), as of April 2020. Production from this farm is supplemented with production from the community, to supply the factory's fresh milk requirements.

== See also ==
- List of milk processing companies in Uganda
- Dairy industry in Uganda
