= Pearl Dairies Honey Factory =

Honey processing plant in Uganda

Coordinates: 00°34′30″S 30°41′22″E

- Founded: 2020
- Headquarters: Mbarara, Uganda
- Area served: Uganda and Europe
- Owner: Pearl Dairy Farms Limited
- Number of employees: 400 (2021)

Pearl Dairies Honey Factory, is a honey-processing plant under construction in Uganda.

== Location ==
The honey processing plant is located in the city of Mbarara, in the Ankole sub-region, in the Western Region of Uganda. Mbarara is located approximately 270 kilometres (168 mi), by road, southwest of Kampala, Uganda's capital and largest city.

== Overview ==
Following the blockage of importation of Ugandan milk into neighboring Kenya in February 2020, Pearl Dairy Farms Limited, whose Lato Brand milk was specifically targeted, decided to invest UShs10 billion (about US$2.75 million) in honey farming, working together with dairy farmers in the districts of Bushenyi, Kabale, Kiruhura, Lyantonde, Mbarara, Mubende, Ntungamo, Rukungiri and Sheema.

The introduction of bee-keeping among dairy farmers, diversified their income and hedged against an unreliable export market for their milk. In 2020, Pearl Dairy Farms Limited started building a honey-processing plant in Mbarara City.

== Operations ==
The parent company, Pearl Dairy Farms Limited, began distributing bee stock to dairy farmers in its network, following the banning of the entry of the company's milk into Kenya in February 2020. It is expected that the production of processed honey will involve approximately 4,000 people, along the value chain. The factory, when completed in 2021, will employ only 10 people, because most of its processes are automated.

There will be two types of processed honey that will come out of this factory. The first type is organic honey for export to Europe. The non-organic honey will be sold in Uganda and its regional neighbors.

The project started with 200 pre-selected farmers, each managing 5 hives, for a total of 1,000 hives. The plan is to scale up to 20,000 hives in the next three years. The factory has processing capacity of 20 tons of pure honey a day.

== Ownership ==
Pearl Dairies Honey Factory is a 100 percent subsidiary of Pearl Dairy Farms Limited, based in Mbarara City.

== Governance ==
The honey project is overseen by Michael Van den berg, the General Manager.

== See also ==
- List of milk processing companies in Uganda
