= Pearl Dairy Farms Limited =

Dairy processing company in Uganda

Coordinates: 00°32′16″N 30°42′52″E

- Type: Private
- Industry: Dairy processing
- Founded: 2012; 14 years ago
- Headquarters: Biharwe, Mbarara, Uganda
- Key people: Bijoy Varghese; General Manager
- Products: Butter oil, ghee, yoghurt, skimmed milk powder, full cream milk powder, UHT milk
- Number of employees: 247 (2016)
- Subsidiaries: In Kenya; Offices in Kampala & Dubai
- Website: Homepage

Pearl Dairy Farms Limited, often referred to as Pearl Dairy, is a dairy processing company in Uganda.

== Location ==
The head office and factory of Pearl Dairy Farms Limited are located in Biharwe, a neighborhood along the Masaka–Mbarara Road, approximately 8.5 kilometres (5 mi) northeast of the central business district of the city of Mbarara, in the Western Region of Uganda. The coordinates of the company headquarters and factory are: 0°33'49.0"S, 30°42'11.0" E (Latitude:-0.563611; Longitude:30.703056).

== Overview ==
The factory is built on 15 acres (6.1 ha) and has the capacity to process 500,000 liters of milk daily. The milk is purchased from dairy farmers in Mbarara District and neighboring communities. The company maintains corporate offices in Kampala and Dubai. Pearl Dairy Farms Limited maintains a subsidiary in Kenya. As of 2015, the company had plans to construct a milk processing plant of its own in that county. Until that factory is built, the company markets dairy products in Kenya, manufactured in its Ugandan plant.

== Ownership ==
The company is a member of the Midland Group of companies, a conglomerate active in Africa and the Middle East. The detailed shareholding in the stock of the company as of March 2016 is shown in the table below. In 2019, Rise Fund, managed by American private equity fund TPG Capital acquired a 34 percent shareholding in Pearl Dairy Farms Limited for an undisclosed amount.

Pearl Dairy Farms Limited Stock Ownership
| Rank | Name of Owner | Ownership in 2016 | Ownership in 2019 |
|---|---|---|---|
| 1 | Bhasker Kotecha and Family | 50.5 | 33.0 |
| 2 | Anand Kapoor and Family | 49.5 | 33.0 |
| 3 | Rise Fund | 0.0 | 34.0 |
| | Total | 100.00 | 100.00 |

== Products ==
The factory manufactures the following products among others: (a) full cream powdered milk (b) skimmed powdered milk (c) instant full cream powdered milk (d) UHT milk (e) ghee and (f) butter oil. The company's products are consumed locally in Uganda and exported to COMESA Countries, West Africa, India, Nepal and United Arab Emirates. In 2019, the firm began manufacturing yogurt for domestic and regional consumption. The yogurt products were developed with the consultant collaboration of Cogito Food & Beverage of Auckland, New Zealand.

In 2023, Pearl Dairy began manufacturing "Lato Grow", "a line of fortified instant milk powder formulated for children between the ages of 3 and 5. Later the same year, they introduced "Lato Nadolac", a specially formulated product intended to wean babies off exclusive breastfeeding after they attain six months of age.

== Diversification ==
In 2020, the company invested an estimated UGX:10 billion (US$2.73 million) in commercial honey farming in collaboration with local dairy farmers. The need to diversify both the company's and farmers’ incomes, arose out of the challenges that the milk production and processing industry has faced. Local over-production, limited local consumption and difficulty in securing willing regional buyers are some of the challenges. As of March 2021, the Pearl Dairies Honey Factory was under construction in Mbarara, 168 miles (270 km) southwest of Kampala.

More than 10,000 dairy farmers in the south western Ugandan districts of Bushenyi, Kabale, Kiruhura, Lyantonde, Mbarara, Mubende, Ntungamo, Sheema and Rukungiri who are confronted with milk-related challenges, will be introduced to honey to diversify their incomes.

As part of its diversification strategy, the company announced plans to enter new regional markets including, Ethiopia, Malawi, South Sudan and Zambia. The four leading export products for the company are (a) powdered milk (b) UHT milk (c) butter and (d) flavored milk.

In June 2021, the company unveiled a new milk-processing line capable of packaging 130,000 litres (28,596 imp gal; 34,342 US gal) daily. The line, which incorporates Sweden-based Tetra Pak technology, cost USh9.25 billion (approx. US$2.6 million) to install. The UHT milk packaged on this line has a shelf-life of up to 9 months if unopened. The company also announced its entry into Ethiopia, South Sudan and Malawi.

== Recent developments ==
In October 2021, the company exported 50 tonnes of powdered milk under its Lato Milk brand. The milk, in two forty-foot container trucks, was destined for Zambia by road, the first ever milk export consignment to that country, from Uganda. The shipment was part of an annual order by the Coca-Cola Beverages Zambia Limited amounting to 700 metric tonnes of powdered milk from Pearl Dairy Farms.

== See also ==
- List of milk processing companies in Uganda
- Dairy industry in Uganda
