= Rushere Community Hospital =

Private faith-based, non-profit, community, hospital in Uganda

- Uganda Protestant Medical Bureau
- Location within Uganda

Geography
- Location: Rushere, Kiruhura District, Western Region, Uganda
- Coordinates: 00°12′35″S 30°56′53″E

Organisation
- Care system: Community Hospital
- Type: General

Services
- Emergency department: I
- Beds: 102 (2020)

History
- Founded: 1992; 34 years ago

Links
- Website: www.rusherehospital.com
- Other links: Hospitals in Uganda

Rushere Community Hospital, is a non-profit community hospital in the Western Region of Uganda. It is affiliated with the Church of Uganda.

== Location ==
The hospital is located in the town of Rushere in Nyabushozi County, in Kiruhura District, about 96 kilometres (60 mi) northeast of Mbarara Regional Referral Hospital, in the city of Mbarara. Rushere Community Hospital is located about 108 kilometres (67 mi), by road, northwest of Masaka Regional Referral Hospital, in the city of Masaka. The geographical coordinates of Rushere Community Hospital are: 0°12'35.0"S, 30°56'53.0"E (Latitude:-0.209722; Longitude:30.948056).

== History ==
Rushere Community Hospital was established in 1992, out of a clinic that was founded in 1988. It is managed by the Uganda Protestant Medical Bureau, since 1998. In 2005, it was designated as a district hospital for Kiruhura District, after signing a memorandum of understanding with the Uganda Ministry of Health.

== Overview ==
The hospital sits on a piece of real estate that measures 62 acres (25 ha). It has bed capacity of 102. It is funded by donations from individuals and institutions from within and outside Uganda. Rushere Community Hospital also receives financial and other assistance from the government of Uganda. As of November 2020, the hospital had 75 members of staff.

Rushere Community Hospital is a private interdenominational Christian, non-profit institution that serves people without regard to age, skin color, nationality, gender or creed. As of November 2020, the hospital maintains the following departments, among others: 1. Out Patient Department 2. HIV Centre 3. Laboratory 4. Pediatric Ward 5. General Ward 6. Private Ward 7. Operating Theatre and 8. Maternity Ward.
