= Lakeside Dairy Limited =

Dairy processing company in Uganda

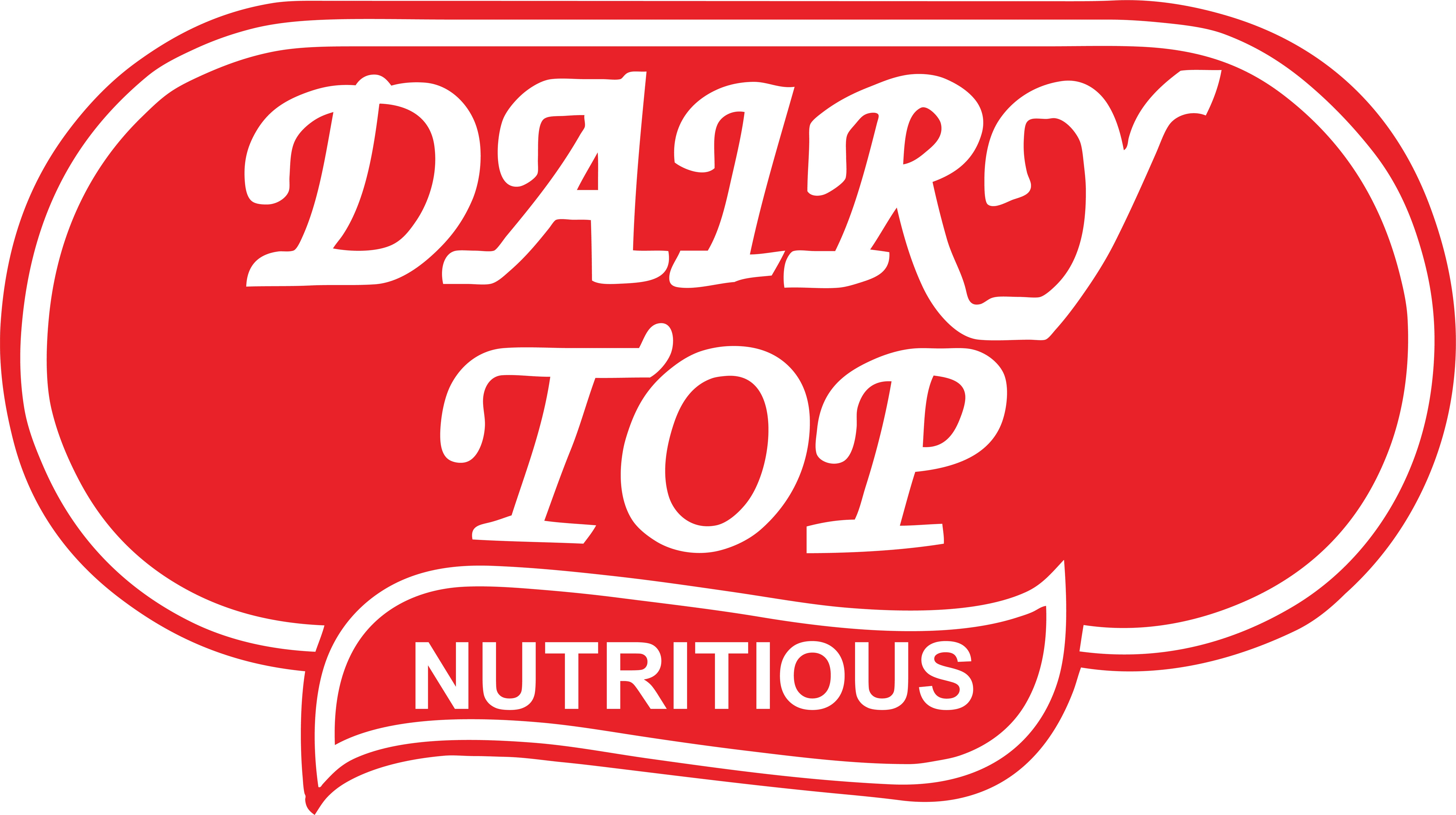
- Company type: Private
- Industry: Dairy processing
- Headquarters: Mbarara, Uganda
- Key people: Pusapati Srihari Reddy; General Manager
- Products: UHT Fino milk, UHT ESL milk, Yoghurt, Ghee, Paneer, Cheese
- Parent: Dodla Holdings Pte. Ltd, Singapore
- Subsidiaries: Sales Offices in Kampala
- Website: http://www.lakesidedairy.net/

Lakeside Dairy Limited (LDL), is a dairy processing company located in Mbarara, Uganda.

== Location ==
The head office and factory of LDL is located in the city of Mbarara, approximately 270 kilometres (168 mi), by road, southwest of Kampala, Uganda's capital and largest city.

== Overview ==
Lakeside Dairy Ltd., was incorporated on 15 July 2014 to acquire the business of Hillside Dairy & Agriculture Ltd., and carry on with the business of Dairy and Agriculture. It is a wholly owned subsidiary of Dodla Holdings Pvt Ltd, Singapore where the current investment is US$3,000,000/- The company has also obtained Investments Licence No. SSD/112494/48186 for establishing a new class of manufacturing plant for processing milk and dairy products.

The group is in expansion mode in Eastern Africa and particularly in Uganda by diversifying its business portfolio. Keeping the above vision in mind, the promoters of the company took cognizance of the growing market of Dairy and Agriculture which are usually consumed directly or indirectly as ingredients in food.

== Ownership ==
LDL is a wholly owned subsidiary of Dodla Holdings Pte Ltd., Singapore.

== Products ==
The factory manufactures the following products among others:

- UHT FINO milk
- UHT ESL milk
- Yoghurt
- Ghee
- Paneer
- Cheese

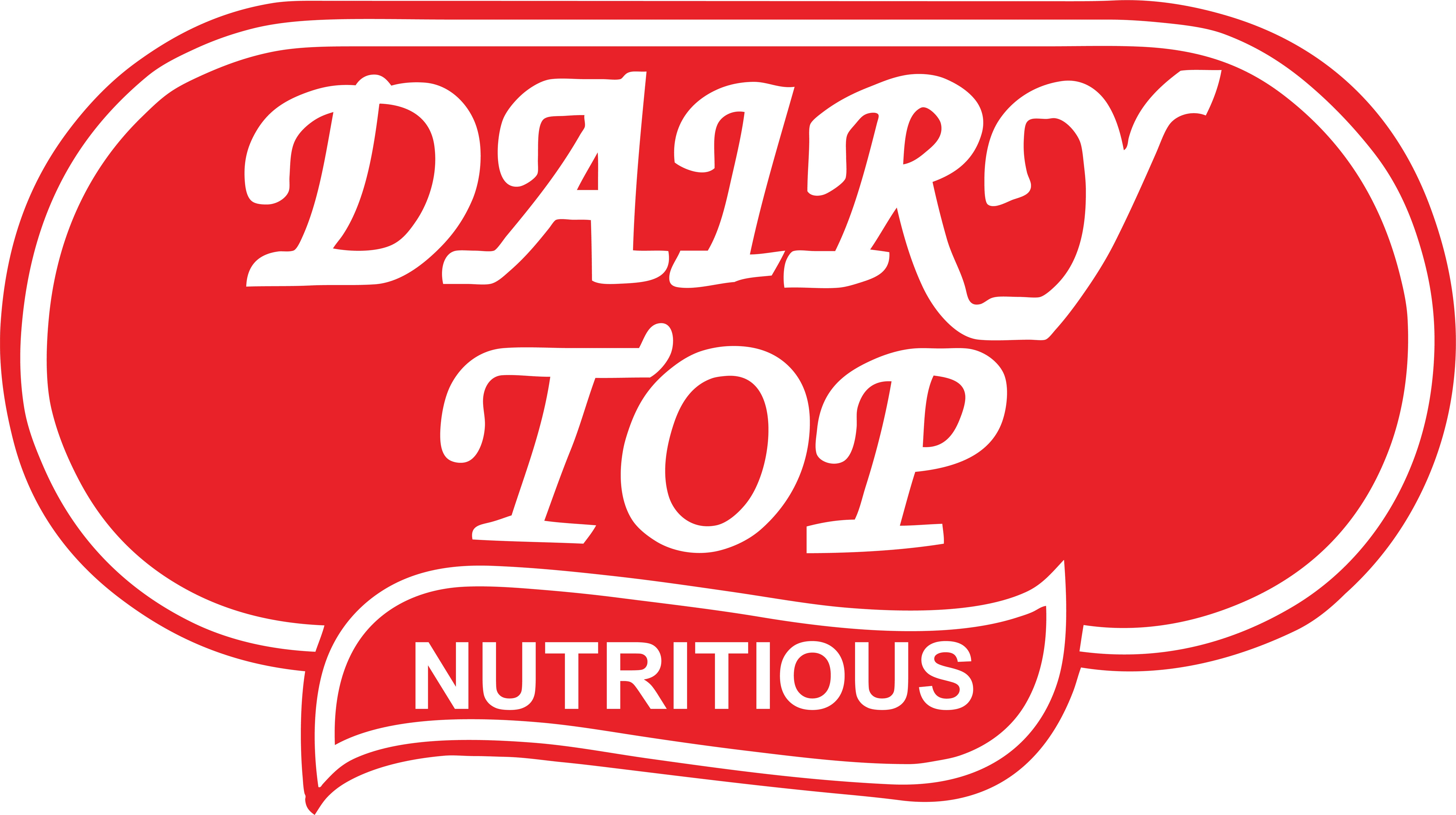
Logo

== See also ==
- List of milk processing companies in Uganda
- Dairy industry in Uganda
