= Gideon Badagawa =

Ugandan corporate executive, policy analyst, and statistician

Gideon Bagadawa
- Born: May 8, 1966; Iganga District
- Died: 21 June 2021 (aged 55); Mulago National Referral Hospital
- Burial place: Muyiira Village, Iganga District
- Education: Makerere University; The International Institute of Social Studies at Erasmus University; Maastricht School of Management
- Years active: 1992-2021
- Employers: Uganda Manufacturers' Association; Private Sector Foundation of Uganda
- Successor: Stephen Asiimwe
- Spouse: Suzan Birungi

Gideon Nathan Badagawa (sometimes Bagadawa; May 8, 1966 – June 21, 2021) was a Ugandan corporate executive, policy analyst, statistician. He was a former executive director of Private Sector Foundation of Uganda (PSFU) and former executive director Uganda Manufacturers' Association. Under his tenue, the PSFU received awards acknowledging contributions made by business associations, corporate companies, and government agencies towards the advancement of the private sector in Uganda.

== Personal and education background ==
Badagawa was born to Isabirye Badagawa on 8 May 1966 in Kigulu, Muyiira village, Nambale sub-county in Iganga district.

Badagawa attended Busoga College Mwiri between 1979 up to 1983 for ordinary level (O'level) and Makerere college School from 1984 to 1886 for Advanced level (A'level) of secondary education. He joined Makerere University in 1988 and graduated with a second-class honor degree in Bachelor's of Statistics. He also graduated from Institute of Social Studies at Erasmus University in Rotterdam for master's degree in developmental studies, econometric, and quantitative economics in 1995. He also attained a post-graduate diploma from Maastricht School of Management in Environment Management. Badagawa also did Statistics for Environmental Policy course from Munich Centre for Advanced Training in Germany in 1996.

Badagawa died of COVID-19 on 21 June 2021 at Mulago National Referral Hospital where he was undergoing treatment, and he was buried on 26 June 2021 in Muyiira village, Iganga district.

== Personal life ==
Badagawa was married to Suzan Birungi whom they had two children.

== Career ==
in 1992, Badagawa was employed by the Ministry of Public Service, a position which he served up to 1993 and left for a job at Ministry of Finance and Planning under the Institute of Data processing in Kampala where he worked as a Business and economic instructor.

Badagawa was a lecturer of National accounting and income analysis in the department of Planning and Applied Statistics of Makerere University from 1992 up to 2002.

In 2000, Badagawa was recruited as a policy analyst at Private Sector Foundation of Uganda. Between 2000 and 2008, he served in various position such as manager policy advocacy, director policy advocacy. He was appointed as the executive director for PSFU in 2008 by the executive board. After his death, Francis Kisirinya who was the deputy executive director during his tenure was appointed the transitional acting executive director of PSFU until he was succeeded by Stephen Asiimwe after his death.

In 2008, Badagawa was appointed the executive director of Uganda Manufacturer's Association, a position which he served for 2 years.

For 21 years, Bagadawa worked with Private Sector Foundation Uganda (PSFU) eleven of which he served as the Executive Director. Before joining PSFU in 2000, he was the executive director of the Uganda Manufacturers Association (UMA) for two years. His tenure at PSFU was marked by his advocacy for the private sector as a key driver of the economy and his efforts in promoting private sector competitiveness and development with efforts to eliminate gender based violence. He was succeeded by Francis Kisirinya as Executive Director for Private Sector Foundation Uganda (PSFU) after his death.

== Achievements ==
During Badagawa tenure as the executive director, he launched the "Tugobe Corona, Wear a Mask" campaign in October 2020 at Hotel Africana which was aimed at reducing the spread of COVID-19 by encouraging people follow safe operating procedures. He stressed the importance of personal responsibility in adhering to COVID-19 Standard Operating Procedures (SOPs) to ensure business continuity and public health.

Badagawa was achieved the partnerships with Uganda's development partners such as World Bank, African Development Bank, European Union, DFID, UK-AIDGIZ Endev, Mastercard Foundation.

Badagawa spearheaded the implementation of various projects funded by World Bank in Uganda which included;

- Market-oriented coffee sector strategy for Uganda, a project which geared at improving supply-to-market linkages.
- Private Sector Competitiveness Project (PSCP II) which aimed at booming public private partnerships in order to enhance the business in Uganda.
- Enterprise Skills Linkages training which equipped youths with entrepreneurial skills and market competitiveness knowledge.

Badagawa during his tenure at PSFU, he promoted the ideas of East Africa Business Council, Common Market for Eastern and Southern Africa (COMESA) by PSFU acting as the bridge between the organizations.

Badagawa spearheaded the execution of Business Technical Vocational Education and Training (BTVET) plan.

Bagadawa was also a strong supporter of job creation in Uganda's emerging oil and gas sector, stressing the need for upskilling Ugandans to take advantage of these opportunities.

== Death ==
Bagadawa died on June 21, 2021, at Mulago Hospital due to complications from COVID-19.

== Awards ==
Badagawa won several awards from different organizations because of his work contributions. These awards include;

- Advanced Leadership Merit Award for Private Sector Development by the Institute of Advanced Leadership
- Pearl of Africa Lifetime Achievers Awards.

== Board membership ==
Badagawa served on various companies/organizations as a board member, namely:

- National Environment Management Authority as the vice-chairman
- Uganda Of Uganda Energy Credit Capitalization Company Limited
- Competitiveness and Investment Climate Strategy Design Team from 2011 up to 2014 as the chairman
- Presidential Investor Roundtable
- National Planning Authority of Uganda
- Uganda Warehouse Receipts Authority
- Economy Policy Research Center
- Business Licensing Reform Committee
- Financial Markets Development Committee
- Uganda Country Capacity Building Programme (UCCBP)

== See also ==
- Uganda Manufacturers' Association
- Barbara Mulwana
- Amos Nzeyi
