= Oxidase =

Enzyme that aids in redox reactions involving O2

In biochemistry, an oxidase is an oxidoreductase (any enzyme that catalyzes a redox reaction) that uses dioxygen (O_{2}) as the electron acceptor. In reactions involving donation of a hydrogen atom, oxygen is reduced to water (H_{2}O) or hydrogen peroxide (H_{2}O_{2}). Some oxidation reactions, such as those involving monoamine oxidase or xanthine oxidase, typically do not involve free molecular oxygen.

The oxidases are a subclass of the oxidoreductases. The use of dioxygen is the only unifying feature; in the EC classification, these enzymes are scattered in many categories.

== Examples ==
An important example is EC 7.1.1.9 cytochrome c oxidase, the key enzyme that allows the body to employ oxygen in the generation of energy and the final component of the electron transfer chain. Other examples are:

- EC 1.1.3.4 Glucose oxidase
- EC 1.4.3.4 Monoamine oxidase
- EC 1.6.3.1 NADPH oxidase
- EC 1.17.3.2 Xanthine oxidase
- EC 1.1.3.8 L-gulonolactone oxidase
- EC 1.10.3.2 Laccase
- EC 1.4.3.13 Lysyl oxidase
- EC 1.10.3.2 Polyphenol oxidase
- Sulfhydryl oxidase. This enzyme oxidises thiol groups.
- Many Cytochrome P450s

== Oxidase test ==
In microbiology, the oxidase test is used as a phenotypic characteristic for the identification of bacterial strains; it determines whether a given bacterium produces cytochrome oxidases (and therefore utilizes oxygen with an electron transfer chain).

The test is used to determine whether a bacterium is an aerobe or anaerobe. However a bacterium that is oxidase negative is not necessarily anaerobic, it may just indicate the bacterium does not possess cytochrome c oxidase.
