= President Kenyatta =

President Kenyatta may refer to

- Jomo Kenyatta, President of Kenya from 1964 to 1978 and father of Uhuru Kenyatta
- Uhuru Kenyatta, President of Kenya from 2013 to 2022 and son of Jomo Kenyatta

== See also ==
- Kenyatta (disambiguation)
