= GBK Dairy Products Limited =

Dairy processing company in Uganda

Coordinates: 00°36′25″S 30°39′42″E

- Company type: Private
- Industry: Dairy processing
- Founded: 1996; 30 years ago
- Headquarters: Mbarara, Uganda
- Key people: Godfrey Kacuma; CEO
- Products: Fresh milk, UHT milk, yogurt, ghee
- Website: Homepage

GBK Dairy Products Limited, often referred to as GBK Dairy, is a dairy processing company in Uganda.

== Location ==
The head office and factory of GBK Dairy Products Limited are located at 70–80 Mbarara–Kabale Road, in the central business district of Mbarara, the largest and most populated city in the Ankole sub-region of the Western Region of Uganda. This is approximately 270 kilometres (168 mi), by road, southwest of Kampala, Uganda's capital and largest city. The geographical coordinates of the head office of the company are:0°36'25.0"S, 30°39'42.0"E (Latitude:-0.606944; Longitude:30.661667).

== Overview ==
GBK Dairy was opened in 1996, with a capacity of 2,000 liters a day. As of May 2015, the plant's production capacity was 100,000 liters per day, although often the factory was under-utilized, producing only 20,000 to 30,000 liters daily, primarily due to a small market. The company's products are marketed locally within Uganda and to neighboring countries within the East African Community.

== Ownership ==
GBK Dairy is a member and subsidiary of the GBK Group of companies, which includes a milk-processing factory, a water purification plant producing bottled drinking water, and a juice-extraction plant manufacturing natural drinking juices. The factory manufactures the following products among others: pasteurized fresh milk, UHT milk, yoghurt and ghee.

== See also ==
- List of milk processing companies in Uganda
- Dairy industry in Uganda
