= List of milk processing companies in Uganda =

The following are the licensed milk processing companies in Uganda. The list is not exhaustive.

Milk Processor	Community	Capacity (liters per day)	Year established	Products
Fresh Dairy	Kampala	500,000	1964	Fresh milk, Ultra-high temperature (UHT) processed milk, Extended shelf life (ESL) milk, butter, ghee, yoghurt, and milk powder
Jesa Farm Dairy Limited	Kampala	80,000	1994	Fresh milk, ESL milk, and yoghurt
Pearl Dairy Farms Limited	Biharwe, Kashari, Mbarara District	500,000	2012	Milk powder, butter oil, ghee, skimmed milk powder, full cream milk powder, UHT milk.
Amos Dairies Uganda Limited	Akageti, Kiruhura District	400,000	2014	Anhydrous milk fat, ghee, casein, and whey
Paramount Dairies Limited	Kakoba, Mbarara	15,000	1992	Cheese and cream
Premier Diaries Uganda Limited	Kampala, Biharwe, Kashari, Kirihura	100,000	2008	Processed Fresh Full Fat Milk and Yoghurt
GBK Dairy Products Limited	Mbarara	50,000	1996	UHT processed milk and yoghurt
Holland Dairy Limited	Kamwookya, Kampala	10,000	2012	Cheese
Vital Tomosi Dairy Limited	Rushere, Kiruhura District	100,000	2015	UHT processed milk and yoghurt

== See also ==
- Agriculture in Uganda
- Dairy industry in Uganda
