= Nyabushozi County =

Residential and administrative unit in Uganda

Nyabushozi
- Counties of Uganda
- Location within Uganda
- Coordinates: 0.3220°S 30.8039°E
- Country: Uganda
- Region: Western Region
- Sub-division: Ankole sub-region
- Capital: Nyabushozi

Area
  - Land: 4,605 km^{2} (1,778 sq mi)

Population (2012 Estimate)
  - Total: 300,800
  - Density: 65.3/km^{2} (169/sq mi)
- Time zone: UTC+3 (EAT)
- Website: www.kiruhura.go.ug

Nyabushozi County is the south constituency of western Region, Ugandas district of Kiruhura. This is where Lake Mburo National Park is found. It borders with Isingiro in the south and Mbarara to the south-west The Area is commonly known for being Cattle keeping area characterised and highly occupied by indigenous Ankole Sanga Cattle.

It is represented by Hon Wilson Kajwengye in the Parliament of Uganda.
