= Brookside Dairy Limited =

Dairy processing company in Kenya

Coordinates: 01°10′42″S 36°57′30″E

- Type: Private
- Industry: Dairy processing
- Founded: 1993
- Headquarters: Ruiru, Kiambu County, Kenya
- Key people: Muhoho Kenyatta (executive chairman & CEO)
- Products: Milk, butter, cheese, yogurt, ice cream
- Subsidiaries: In Kenya, Uganda and Tanzania
- Website: Homepage

Brookside Dairy Limited, often referred to as Brookside Dairies, is a dairy processing company in Kenya, the largest economy in the East African Community. The company offers fresh pasteurized milk, cream, butter, yogurt, ghee, and long-life milk products in the Indian Ocean Islands, East Africa, Rwanda, and Burundi. It provides products through distribution depots, agents, and sub-agents to outlets throughout East Africa.

== Location ==
The head office of Brookside Dairies is located along Thika Road in Ruiru, opposite Kenyatta University, approximately 25 kilometres (16 mi) northeast of Nairobi, the capital and largest city in Kenya. The coordinates of the company headquarters are:1°10'42.0"S, 36°57'30.0"E (Latitude:-1.178333; Longitude:36.958333).

== Overview ==
Brookside Dairies is the largest milk processing company in Kenya, controlling about 45 percent of the dairy market as of January 2016. The company's products, including fresh and powdered milk, yogurt, and butter, are distributed in the East African countries of Kenya, Tanzania, and Uganda.

== History ==
Brookside Dairies was established in 1993 by members of the Jomo Kenyatta Family, including his son Uhuru Kenyatta, who was elected President of Kenya in 2013. In 2009, the Gulf-area-based private equity firm Abraaj Capital paid US$18.7 million for a 10 percent shareholding in the business. In 2014, French yogurt maker Danone paid an undisclosed sum to acquire a 40 percent stake in Brookside. Beginning in 2013, Brookside has expanded by acquiring stakes in rival milk processing plants in Kenya, Uganda. Ethiopia and Nigeria.

== Branches ==
As of January 2015, Brookside Dairies maintained offices at the following locations:

1. Ruiru Office (main office) – Ruiru, Kenya
2. Kampala Office – Kampala, Uganda
3. Arusha Office – Arusha, Tanzania
4. Mwanza Office – Mwanza, Tanzania
5. Dar es Salaam Office – Dar es Salaam, Tanzania

== Ownership ==
Brookside Dairies is a limited liability company, registered in Kenya. As of May 2015, the shareholding in the company stock was as depicted in the table below:

Brookside Dairy Limited stock ownership
Rank	Name of owner	Percentage ownership
1	Kenyatta family	50.0
2	Danone	40.0
3	The Abraaj Group	10.0
	Total	100.00

== Recent developments ==
In May 2015, Brookside Dairies paid KSh3.5 billion (about US$40 million) for 51 percent shareholding in Sameer Agriculture & Livestock Limited (SALL), a dairy processing company in neighboring Uganda, in which the Ugandan government maintains a 49 percent shareholding. That business rebranded to Brookside Dairy Uganda Limited. In January 2016, the Kenyan press reported that the company had plans to expand to West Africa, starting with Nigeria.

== See also ==
- NCBA Group Plc
- Dairy industry in Uganda
- List of milk processing companies in Uganda
- List of wealthiest people in Kenya
