= Kenyatta (given name) =

Kenyatta is an African masculine name of Kenyan origin from the Kikuyu tribe. It derives from the surname of Jomo Kenyatta, the first Prime Minister and then President of Kenya from 1964 to 1978.

It may also refer to other artists such as:

- Kenyatta A.C. Hinkle (born 1987), American artist
- Kenyatta Cheese, American activist, software engineer, and businessman
- Kenyatta Lee Bettis Frazier Jr. (born 2000), American rapper known by his stage name Ken Carson
- Kenyatta Jackson (born 2004), American football player
- Kenyatta Johnson (born 1973), American politician
- Kenyatta Jones (born 1979), American football player
- Kenyatta Walker (born 1979), American football player
- Kenyatta Wright (born 1978), American football player
- Ken Lucas (American football) (born 1979), American football player.

== See also ==
- Kenyatta (surname)
- Kenyatta (disambiguation)
