= Anne Nyokabi Muhoho =

Jomo Kenyatta family

Anne Nyokabi Mūhoho
- Born: 1920
- Died: August 2006 (aged 85–86)
- Other names: Hannah
- Occupation: mother-in-law to the first president of Kenya Jomo Kenyatta (1964–1978)

Anne Nyokabi Mūhoho (also called Hannah) (1920–August 2006) was married to Chief Muhoho in Kenya, and the mother-in-law of Jomo Kenyatta, the first prime minister (1963–1964) and the first president of Kenya (1964–1978). A girls' school in Nairobi bears her name.

== Families ==
Her daughter Ngina Kenyatta (born 1931) was the first lady to late president Jomo Kenyatta. Anne Nyokabi Muhoho's son George Muhoho has been a Catholic priest, the first black African diplomat to the Vatican embassy attaché for the EU in Brussels.

She had two grandsons by Ngina, and Uhuru Kenyatta was elected the fourth president of Kenya in 2013,

After her husband died, she became a successful businessperson. In latter stage of her life, she lived on her family farm until her death in August 2006 near Nairobi.

== See also ==
- George Muhoho
- Ngina Kenyatta
