= George Muhoho =

Former director general of the Kenya Airports Authority

George Kamau Muhoho (born 1936) is a former Director General of the Kenya Airports Authority (KAA).

== Biography ==
Mūhoho is a son of Chief Muhoho and his wife Nyokabi, brother to Mama Ngina Kenyatta. He was a Catholic priest, and studied until 1968 at the Collegio San Pietro in Rome church law. In 1971 he was appointed as the first black African diplomat to the Vatican embassy attache at the EU in Brussels. In 1972 he was commissioned by Pope Paul VI. returned to the lay state. He was then responsible for the public relations department of the UNEP in Nairobi. In 1976 he married the lawyer Jean Njeri Koinange. President Moi appointed Muhoho in the Cabinet and appointed him successively with the post of education, tourism and technology minister. In 1991 he left the KANU and joined as a founding member of the Democratic Party of Mwai Kibaki, whose treasurer he is today. He is also a member of the Council of Elders of the party.

In 2004, he was appointed by Kibaki appointed director of the Kenya Airports Authority (KAA) and has been responsible for the development and also the safety of the Kenyan Airports.
