= Kenyatta (disambiguation) =

Jomo Kenyatta (c. 1897–1978) was the first Prime Minister and President of Kenya.

Kenyatta may also refer to:

- Kenyatta (given name), an African masculine given name
- Kenyatta (surname)
- Kenyatta University, a public university in Kenya
- Lake Kenyatta, a lake in southeastern Kenya
- Kenyatta series, a series of novels by Donald Goines under the pseudonym of Al C. Clark
- Kenyatta, a 1973 documentary film and part of The Black Man's Land Trilogy

== See also ==
- Kenyatta family
