= Jesa Farm Dairy Limited =

Dairy processing company in Uganda

Coordinates: 00°19′11″N 32°35′58″E

- Type: Private
- Industry: Dairy processing
- Founded: 1994
- Headquarters: Kampala, Uganda
- Key people: Geoffrey Mulwana, CEO
- Products: Milk, butter, yogurt, cream
- Website: https://jesa.co.ug

Jesa Farm Dairy Limited, often referred to as Jesa Farm Dairy, is a dairy processing company in Uganda.

== Location ==
The head office and factory of Jesa Farm Dairy is located along Old Port Bell Road, in the industrial area of Kampala, Uganda's capital and largest city. The coordinates of the company headquarters and factory are: 0°19'11.0"N, 32°35'58.0"E (Latitude:0.319724; Longitude:32.599448).

== Overview ==
Jesa Farm Dairy is an indigenous Ugandan operation, a member of the Mulwana Group of Companies, which include a dairy farm, a plastics manufacturing company, a battery-manufacturing business and a real estate development company.

== History ==
In 1988, the late James Mulwana and his wife Sarah Mulwana established a dairy farm at Mikka Village, in Wakiso District, approximately 54 kilometres (34 mi), by road, northwest of Kampala, along Kampala–Hoima Road. They stocked the firm with 550 Friesian cows and named it Jesa Mixed Farm Limited. In 1994, Jesa Farm Dairy Limited was formed to produce "packed milk, butter, yoghurt and cream".

== Ownership ==
Jesa Farm Dairy Limited is owned by the estate of its founder, the late James Mulwana (1936–2013).

== Products ==
The factory manufactures products including fresh milk, ESL milk, Flavoured milk yoghurt, Butters, Bonga Yoghurt and cream.

== See also ==
- List of milk processing companies in Uganda
- Dairy industry in Uganda
