= Amos Dairies Uganda Limited =

Dairy processing company in Uganda

Coordinates: 00°27′54″S 31°01′50″E

Amos Diaries Uganda Limited
- Company type: Private
- Industry: Dairy processing
- Founded: May 13, 2014; 12 years ago
- Headquarters: Akageti, Kiruhura District, Uganda
- Key people: Dewan C. Pruthi; Chairman
- Products: Anhydrous milk fat, ghee, casein, and whey

Amos Dairies Uganda Limited, also Amos Dairies, is a dairy processing company in Uganda. It is a subsidiary of Amos Dairies Limited, an Indian company with headquarters in New Delhi, India.

== Location ==
The head office and factory of Amos Dairies Uganda Limited are located in the town called Akageti, in Kiruhura District, in the Ankole sub-region of the Western Region of Uganda. Akageti is located approximately 52 kilometres (32 mi) north-east of Mbarara, the largest city in the sub-region, along the Masaka–Mbarara Road. This is approximately 217.5 kilometres (135 mi), by road, southwest of Kampala, the capital and largest city in that country.

== Overview ==
The factory, which took approximately 18 months to construct, cost about US$22 million (about USh55.8 billion, at that time). Beginning with capacity of 400,000 liters per day. It was expected that production would gradually be increased to 2 million liters daily. Most of the products that this factory puts out are exported to various regions of the world, including the United States of America. The local farmers in the district and sub-region are expected to benefit from the ready market for their milk at competitive prices.

== Operations ==
Amos Dairies Uganda Limited purchases raw milk from 7,000 to 10,000 smallholder farmers in the community, through cooperative societies and middlemen. The milk is processed into Anhydrous milk fat, Butter, Ghee, Casein and Whey. The factory products are exported, to earn the country valuable foreign exchange. In February 2020, Amos Diaries began to purchase raw milk from Kabula Farmers’ Cooperative Society, in Lyantonde District, the district to the immediate east of Kiruhura District, where the factory is located.

== See also ==
- List of milk processing companies in Uganda
- Dairy industry in Uganda
