= James Mulwana =

Ugandan Business Magnet

- Born: 24 July 1936; Busunju, Uganda
- Died: January 15, 2013 (aged 76); Nakasero Hospital
- Education: Mengo Senior School (EACE); Aggrey Memorial Secondary School (EAACE)
- Occupations: Businessman, entrepreneur, & industrialist
- Years active: 1967 - 2013
- Title: Former Group Chairman & CEO; Mulwana Group of Companies
- Spouse: Sarah Mulwana

James Mulwana (24 July 1936 – 15 January 2013) was a Ugandan businessman. He was the Group chairman and chief executive officer of the Mulwana Group of Companies, a diverse business conglomerate with interests in dairy farming, plastics, manufacturing, and real estate. From 1992 until his death in 2013, Mulwana served as a non-executive director on the board of directors of Standard Chartered Uganda, the second-largest commercial bank in the country, by assets. From 1998 until 2013, he was the chairman of that board. At the time of his death, he was listed as one of the wealthiest individuals in Uganda.

== Early life and education ==
James Mulwana was born in Buganda on 24 July 1936. He attended Mengo Senior School, in northwestern Kampala, Uganda's capital and largest city. Later, he studied at Aggrey Memorial School, also in Kampala. At an early age, he began engaging in import and export. In 1961, at the age of 25, he started his first formal company, Associated Battery Manufacturers Limited, in partnership with Chloride (UK) Plc..

== Mulwana Group ==
The list of businesses that he owned included the following:

In 1961, at the age of 25, he partnered with Chloride (UK) Plc. to form Associated Battery Manufacturers Limited. Later, that business became Uganda Batteries Limited, a leading battery manufacturer in Uganda. Mulwana took majority control of the business in 1991.

Nice House of Plastics Limited is a company that he established in 1970. It manufactures plastic products, including toothbrushes, chairs, washbasins, jerry cans, and drinking cups.

Jesa Mixed Farm Limited was formed in 1988. It is located near Busunju, approximately 57 kilometres (35 mi), by road, north of Kampala, along the Kampala–Hoima Road.

Nsimbe Estate Limited was founded in 1992, in partnership with a strategic shareholder from Germany. The company grows, processes, and exports cut flowers.

Jesa Farm Dairy was established in 1994. It pasteurizes, processes, and packages milk and manufactures packed milk, butter, yoghurt. and ice cream.

Jesa Investments Limited, a commercial real estate development company, was founded in 2002.

== Death ==
In early January 2013, James Mulwana, who received regular medical checkups from London and Thailand, entered Nakasero Hospital, an upscale private hospital in Kampala, on account of an abdominal ailment. At 4.00am, on the morning of Tuesday, 15 January 2013, he died, at the hospital.

According to his wishes, his body was laid to rest at his ancestral home in Masiriba Village, Mityana District, near the town of Bukomero. He is survived by one widow, Sarah Mulwana, two daughters; Primrose Mulwana and Barbara Mulwana and one son Geoffrey Mulwana, the heir. They continued to run the family businesses after his death.

== See also ==
- Economy of Uganda
- Mengo Senior School
- List of milk processing companies in Uganda
- Dairy industry in Uganda
