= Lake Mburo National Park =

National park in Uganda

- IUCN category II (national park)
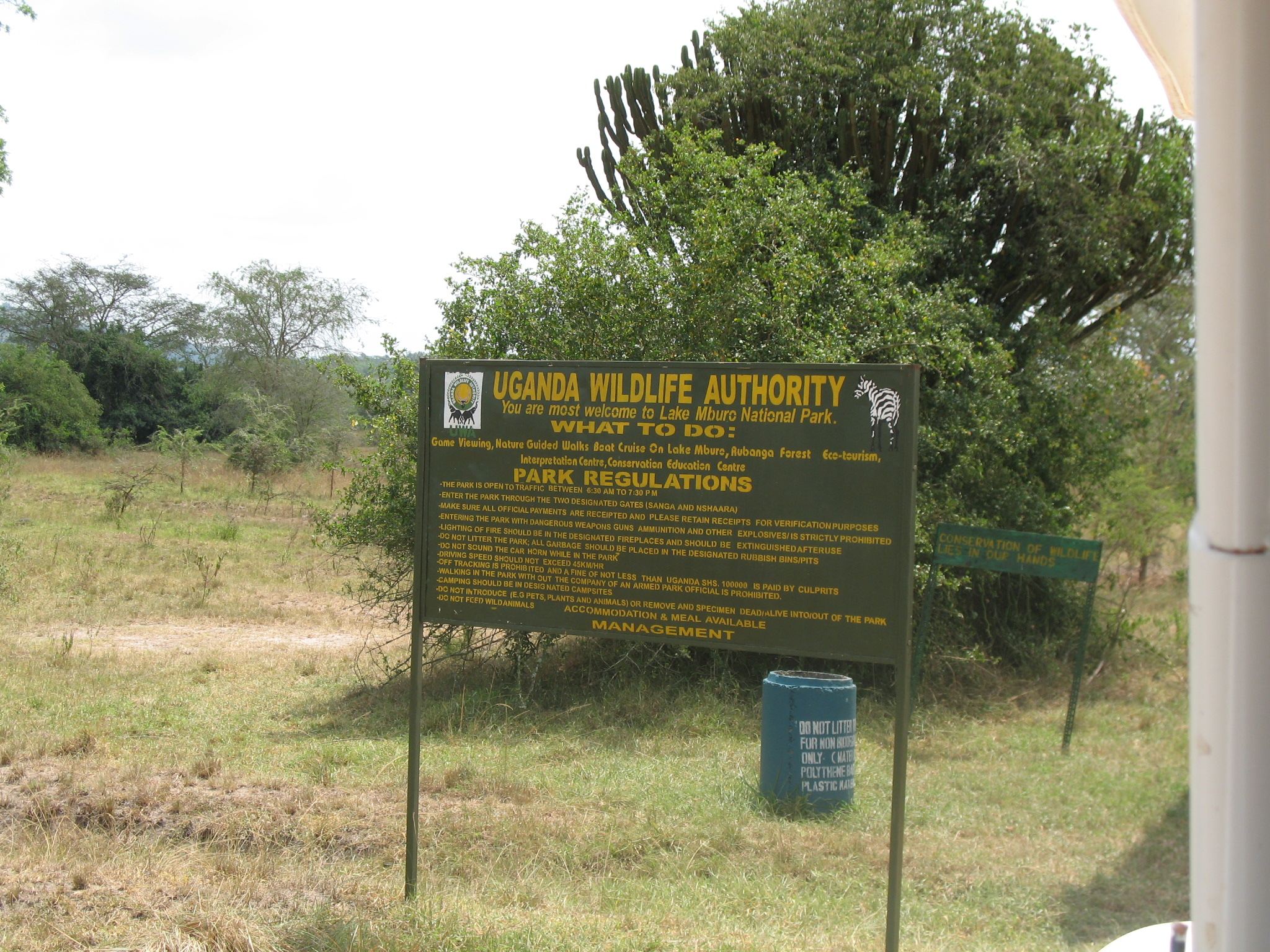
- The entrance sign to Lake Mburo National Park

- Location within Uganda
- Location: Nyabushozi County, Kiruhura District, Uganda
- Nearest city: Mbarara
- Coordinates: 00°37′40″S 30°58′00″E
- Area: 260 km^{2} (100 sq mi)
- Established: 1983
- Governing body: Ugandan Wildlife Authority

Ramsar Wetland
- Official name: Lake Mburo-Nakivali Wetland System
- Designated: 15 September 2006
- Reference no.: 1634

Lake Mburo National Park is a national park located in Nyabushozi County, Kiruhura District in Uganda.

== Location ==
Lake Mburo National Park is located in Kiruhura District in the Western Region of Uganda, about 30 km (19 mi) east of Mbarara and about 240 km (150 mi) west of Kampala.

== History ==
Lake Mburo was originally gazetted in 1933 as a controlled hunting area and upgraded to a game reserve in 1963. The region was settled by Banyankole Bahima pastoralists who traditionally herd Ankole cattle, and still do. The residents continued to graze their cattle in the reserve, a situation decried by western conservationists, who termed them "invaders" in 1981, but were expelled from their lands after it was upgraded to national park status in 1983, as hoped for by some in the West. The Obote government's upgrade decision was intended, in part, to weaken the Banyankole, who supported anti-Obote rebels. It came at the time of the Operation Bonanza massacre of 300,000 people during the Ugandan Bush War. As the evicted pastoralists were not compensated for lost grazing land or assisted with resettling, many remained hostile to the upgrade. The rangeland outside the park was subsequently subdivided into small ranges and subsistence farming plots.

In 1985, the second Obote regime fell and the previous residents of Lake Mburo re-occupied the park's land, expelling park staff, destroying infrastructure, and killing wildlife. Less than half of the park's original land area was eventually re-gazetted by the National Resistance Movement government in 1986.

Within the park there are still culturally significant locations, such as Rubanga, where sacrifices were once made to the gods; Ruroko is where the semi-mythical Bachwezi lived, and Kigarama was where the servants of the king used to stay.

== Wildlife ==
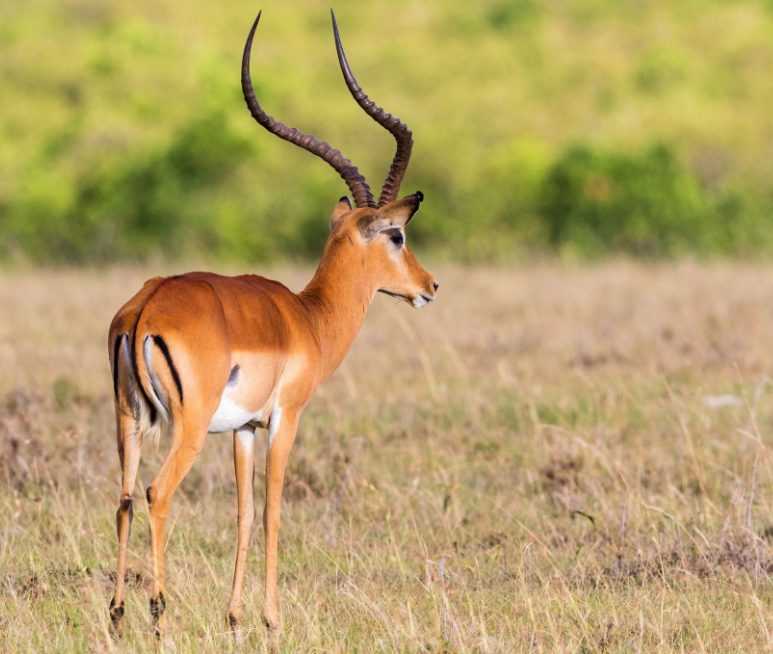
Impala at Lake Mburo National Park

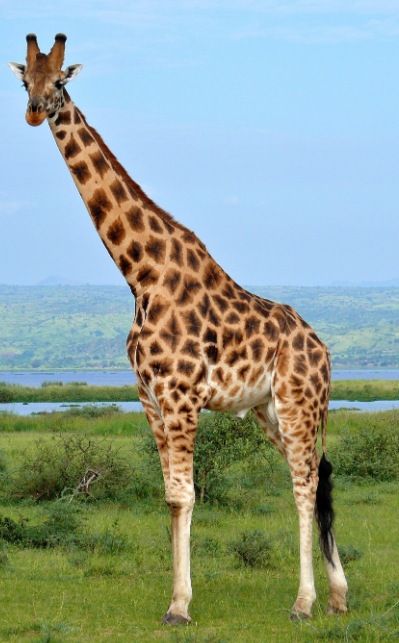
Rothschild's giraffe in Lake Mburo National Park

The park hosts zebra, hippopotamus, impala, warthog, common eland, African buffalo and over 300 bird species. Predators may include the lion, leopard, hyena, genet, African civet, jackals and serval, and since 2015 there is a population of Rothschild's giraffes.

The protected area was considered a 'lion conservation unit' by the IUCN in 2005, despite lions no longer occurring here. Lions were eliminated by the indigenous people in the 1980s, but there were reports in early 2015 of a single lion roaming the areas of Miriti, Kashara, Warukiri and Rwonyo. Because this was considered problematic by the local residents, a solution offered was to translocate the lion to the zoo. At the same time, park management floated the idea of reintroducing lions to the park. The lion roaming the area eventually attacked and injured three people, causing a large crowd of the enraged community to hound the animal with stones and sticks. The Uganda Wildlife Authority made the decision to kill the animal, as the community was angry and the situation had become dangerous. It is thought to have migrated from Kagera Game Reserve in Tanzania.

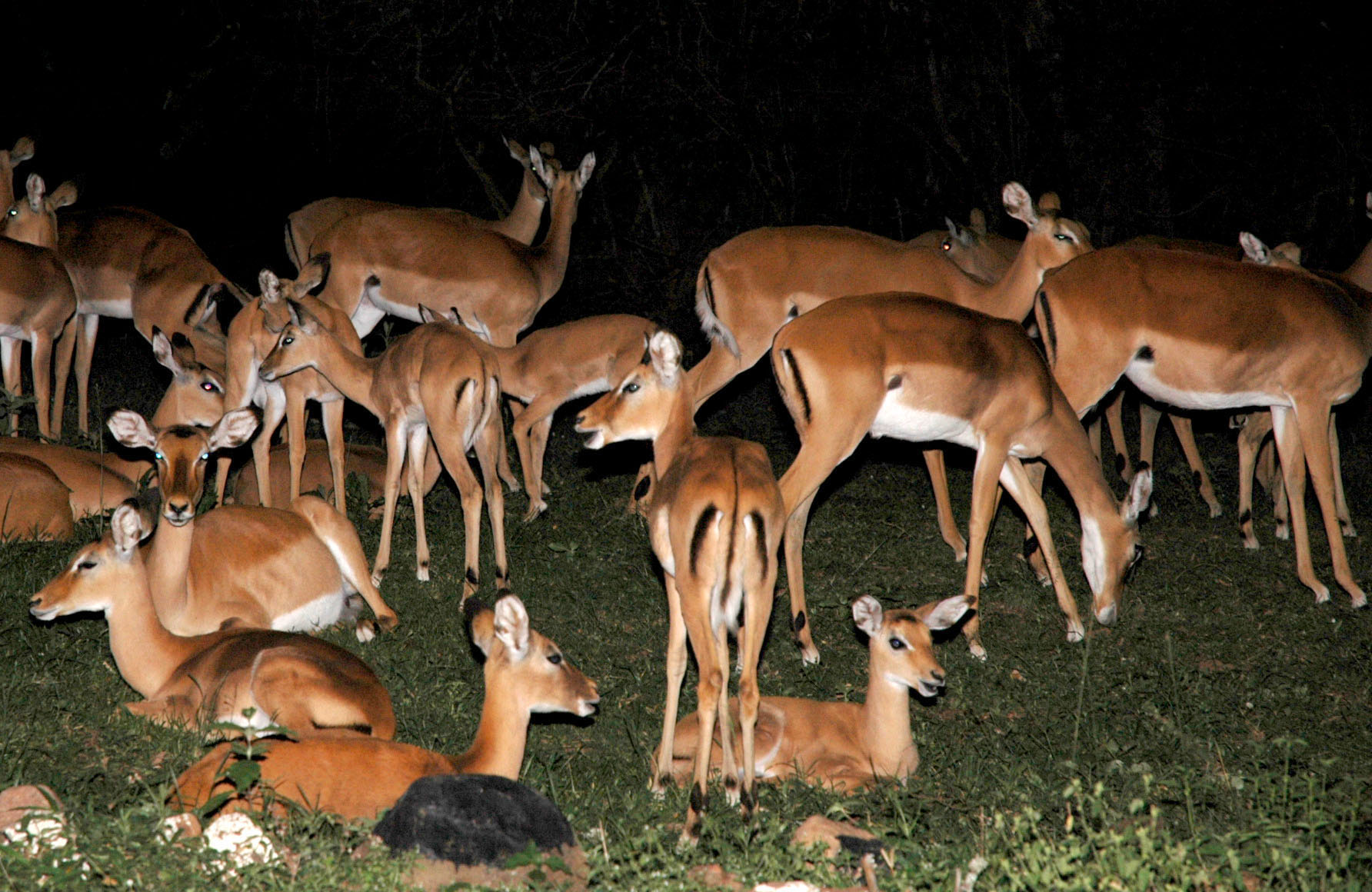
Impalas sleeping at night in Lake Mburo National Park

A problem facing grazers in the park are the changes in habitat occurring over time. Most areas which were formerly grassland in the park have changed into bushveld or forest as the invasive native shrubby tree species Acacia hockii has colonised these areas. The acacia in turn is protecting other bush and tree species, which are growing faster and thicker. This afforestation is forcing animals into the surrounding ranches and private land, causing them to be resented as pests. The government has tried to organise these areas into controlled hunting areas for trophy hunting, but land owners complain the money this generates is being spent on community projects such as schools, health centres and roads rather than addressing individual challenges resulting from problem animals. The procurement of an excavator for habitat management, different wildfire regimes, fencing, translocating excess animals, wildlife ranching for the hunting industry, community tourism, licensing more sport hunting companies and increasing quotas may alleviate this; the local community is permitted to uproot acacia for firewood, but this has proved ineffective. Hyenas and Cape bushbuck in particular are considered problem animals.

== See also ==
- Mbarara District
- Masaka District
