= Uganda Manufacturers' Association =

Coordinates: 00°19′37″N 32°36′34″E

- Company type: Private
- Industry: Manufacturing
- Founded: 1988
- Headquarters: Kampala, Uganda
- Key people: Barbara Mulwana; Chairperson; Daniel Birungi; Executive Director
- Website: www.uma.or.ug

Uganda Manufacturers' Association (UMA), is an industry-association in Uganda, that aims to bring together Ugandan industrialists and manufacturers in an attempt to guide the industrial actors in the country towards global competitiveness, on a sustainable basis. The association advises the government of Uganda in the formulation of national and regional industrial policy. UMA also serves as a collective lobby and mouthpiece for its members.

== Location ==
The headquarters of UMA are located at the Lugogo Show Grounds, in the Nakawa Division of Kampala, the capital and largest city in Uganda. This is approximately 4.2 kilometres (3 mi), by road, east of the central business district of the city, along the Kampala-Jinja Road. The coordinates of the headquarters of the Uganda Manufacturers' Association are: 0°19'37.0"N, 32°36'34.0"E (Latitude:0.326944; Longitude:32.609444).

== Overview ==
As of October 2017, the Uganda Manufactures Association had over 600 member companies in all regions of Uganda. UMA is organized into four departments: 1. the Policy and Advocacy Department, 2. the Trade Promotion and Marketing Department, 3. the Communication Department and 4. the Business Support Department.

UMA is governed by a six-member Advisory Council. There also is an 18-person board of directors, which reports to the Council. The board is chaired by Barbara Mulwana, the daughter of the late James Mulwana, who founded the association in 1988. Below the board is the secretariat, subdivided into departments. The Secretariat is headed by an Executive Director, currently Daniel Birungi.

== History ==
In April 1988, the late James Mulwana, led a group of Ugandan industrialists and manufacturers to inaugurate UMA. The founder-members included James Mulwana, Alam Manzoor, Aga Ssekalaala Sr., Gordon Wavamunno, Henry Makmot and several other executives from government parastatal companies. There was an association by the same name founded in the 1960s by the late Jayant Madhvani, but that association collapsed when he died in 1971.

== Annual UMA Trade Fair ==
Beginning in 1989, UMA began to organize a national trade fair at the national trade show-grounds, then located in the city of Jinja, about 80 kilometres (50 mi), by road, east of Kampala. The first fair in Kampala was held in 1992 in Lugogo Indoor Stadium, in the Lugogo neighborhood, on Kololo Hill, in 1992. Later, UMA, led by James Mulwana was given 22 acres (9 ha) by the government of Uganda, where the association constructed its current show grounds.

== See also ==
- Economy of Uganda
- List of conglomerates in Uganda
