= Paramount Dairies Limited =

Dairy processing company in Uganda

Coordinates: 01°10′42″S 36°57′30″E

Paramount Dairy Limited
- Type: Private
- Industry: Dairy processing
- Founded: 1992
- Headquarters: Mbarara, Uganda
- Key people: John Anglin; Managing Director
- Products: Cheese, cream
- Number of employees: 50+ (2011)
- Subsidiaries: Offices in Mbarara and Kampala, Uganda

Paramount Dairies Limited (PDL), often referred to as Paramount Dairies, is a dairy processing company in Uganda. PDL is a leading manufacturer of Cheddar and Gouda cheeses in Uganda. In 2013, the Daily Monitor newspaper named this company among the 6 key milk processors in the country, out of at least 30 licensed operators.

== Location ==
The head office and factory of the company are located in the neighborhood called Kakoba, in the town of Mbarara, in Mbarara District, in Uganda's Western Region, approximately 270 kilometres (168 mi), by road, southwest of Kampala, the capital and largest city in that country. The coordinates of the company headquarters and factory are:0°36'39.0"S, 30°40'29.0"E (Latitude:-0.610830; Longitude:30.674718).

== Overview ==
PDL began as a family business in 1992, with installed capacity of 200 liters per day. As at 2011, the company employed over 50 personnel to produce 8 varieties of cheeses, which were sold to leading supermarket chains in Uganda's urban centers and to neighboring Rwanda. At that time, plans were underway to expand processing capacity to 100,000 liters per day.

== Products ==
The include cheese and cream.

== See also ==
- List of milk processing companies in Uganda
- Dairy industry in Uganda
