= Ngina Kenyatta =

Former Kenya's First Lady

Ngìna Kenyatta

1st First Lady of Kenya
- In role 12 December 1964 – 22 August 1978
- President: Jomo Kenyatta
- Preceded by: Position established
- Succeeded by: Lena Moi

Personal details
- Born: Ngìna Mūhoho; 24 June 1933 (age 93) Ngenda, Kiambu, British Kenya
- Party: KANU
- Spouse: Jomo Kenyatta (m. 1951; died 1978)
- Children: 4, including Uhuru, Nyokabi, and Muhoho
- Religion: Roman Catholicism

Ngìna Kenyatta (née Mūhoho; born 24 June 1933), popularly known as "Mama Ngìna", is the former First Lady of Kenya. She is the widow of Kenya's first president, Jomo Kenyatta (~1889–1978), and mother of the fourth president Uhuru Kenyatta who served from 2013 to 2022.

== Biography ==
Mama Ngìna was born Ngìna Mūhoho to Chief Mūhoho wa Gatheha and Anne Nyokabi Muhoho at Ngenda, Kiambu District, Central Province in 1933 . She married Jomo Kenyatta as his fourth wife in 1951, a union characterised as a "gift" to Kenyatta from his ethnic group, the Kikuyu. This became her reference as the "mother of the nation", becoming Mama Ngìna Kenyatta, independent Kenya's glamorous First Lady when Kenyatta became president in 1964. She often accompanied him in public and had some streets in Nairobi and Mombasa, as well as a Children's Home, named after her. In 1965, she became patron of Kenyan Guiding.

In the 1970s, she and other high-level government officials were allegedly involved in an ivory-smuggling ring which transported tusks out of the country in the state private airliner. A May 1975 edition of New Scientist cited her as one of Kenya's "ivory queens" but also asserted they could not be completely certain that these claims were true. However, New Scientist claimed that there was now documentary proof that at least one member of Kenya's royal family had shipped over six tons of ivory to Red China.

Mama Ngìna became a Roman Catholic, and was known to attend Mass every Sunday in the Catholic mission with some of their children. She also became one of the richest individuals in Kenya, owning plantations, ranches, and hotels.

In October 2021, the Pandora Papers revealed that she bequeathed part of her fortune in 2017. She and her son Uhuru were unmasked as Client 13173 by the Pandora Papers. The report stated that the Kenyatta family had offshore investments including a company with assets worth at least $30 million.

== Family ==
Jomo Kenyatta married four wives, Wahu Kenyatta, Edna Clarke, Grace Wanjiku, and Ngìna Kenyatta. With Wahu, Kenyatta had Peter Mūigai Kenyatta (1920-1979) and Margaret Rose Wambūi (1928–2017). Edna's only child was Peter Magan Kenyatta. Grace died giving birth to her only child, Jane "Jeni" Gecaga (1950–).

Ngìna's children include Kristina Wambūi Pratt (1952–), Uhuru Kenyatta, Anna Nyokabi Muthama, and Muhoho Kenyatta. Uhuru Kenyatta unsuccessfully ran for president as President Moi's preferred successor in 2002 and became Kenya's fourth President. Mūhoho Kenyatta runs the family's vast business but lives out of the public limelight. During Jomo Kenyatta's exile at Lodwar and Maralal, Ngìna stayed with him, as did their daughters, Jane and Wambūi. Mama Ngìna is step-mother to Kenyatta's other three children, two by his first wife and one by the second.

Monsignor George Muhoho, Roman Catholic chaplain at the University of Nairobi, is one of her brothers.
