= Muhoho Kenyatta =

Son of Jomo Kenyatta

- Born: 1965 (age 60–61)
- Education: St. Mary's School, Nairobi
- Alma mater: Williams College
- Known for: Leading Brookside Dairy Limited as CEO
- Board member of: NCBA Group Plc, Brookside Dairy Limited
- Parents: Jomo Kenyatta (father); Ngina Kenyatta (mother)
- Relatives: Uhuru Kenyatta (brother)

Muhoho Kenyatta is a Kenyan national and a member of the Kenyatta family. He is a son of Kenya's first President Jomo Kenyatta. His older brother Uhuru Kenyatta is the former president and 4th President of Kenya. He was educated at St. Mary's School, Nairobi, and graduated with a Bachelor's of Arts in Political Science from Williams College in 1985.

== Early life and education ==
He attended St. Mary's School, Nairobi, and later graduated with a Bachelors of Arts in Political Science from Williams College in 1985.

== Career ==
=== Business ===
He is also the Executive Chairman and CEO of Brookside Dairy Limited which is owned in part by the Kenyatta family and Danone. He's also been the Vice-chairperson of Commercial Bank of Africa Group before its merger with National Industrial Credit Bank. He currently sits on the board of NCBA Group Plc Uganda. His holding in the company is valued at roughly 20 million dollars. He is the one who handles most of the Kenyatta family's businesses.

He is one of the few Kenyans with a license to import sugar. After members of parliament accused Muhoho of importing contraband sugar in 2018, Uhuru agreed to bring criminal charges against his brother if there were any clear evidence against him.

== Other considerations ==
He is credited with playing a pivotal role in the acquittal of his brother from the International Criminal Court, where Uhuru Kenyatta was on trial for crimes against humanity.

In October 2021, he was cited in the pandora papers scandal.
