= Dairy Development Authority =

Government agency of Uganda

Coordinates: 00°19′34″N 32°34′59″E

- DDA

Agency overview
- Formed: 2000
- Jurisdiction: Uganda
- Headquarters: 1 Kafu Road Nakasero Kampala
- Employees: 39 (2016)
- Agency executive: Jolly Zaribwende, Executive Director
- Parent agency: Uganda Ministry of Agriculture, Animal Industry and Fisheries
- Website: Homepage

The Dairy Development Authority (DDA) is a government agency of Uganda, responsible for the provision of dairy development and regulatory services to promote increased, sustainable milk production and consumption and the attainment of a profitable dairy industry sector, increased economic development and improved nutritional status of Ugandans.

== Location ==
The headquarters of the agency are located at 1 Kafu Road, on Nakasero Hill, in the Central Division of Kampala, the capital and largest city in Uganda. The coordinates of the agency headquarters are: 0°19'34.0"N, 32°34'59.0"E (Latitude:0.326111; Longitude:32.583056). The agency maintains a branch office in the western Ugandan city of Mbarara and an analytical laboratory in the Lugogo neighborhood of Kampala.

== Overview ==
The DDA was established in 2000, by Act of Parliament, with the objective of providing proper coordination and efficient implementation of all government policies which are designed to achieve and maintain self-sufficiency in the production of milk in Uganda. It is closely affiliated with the Uganda Ministry of Agriculture, Animal Industry and Fisheries.

== Departments ==
The agency is administered under three departments:

1. Dairy Development Department
2. Regulatory Services Department
3. Finance and Administration Department

== See also ==
- Economy of Uganda
- Agriculture in Uganda
