= Kiruhura, Uganda =

Kiruhura
- Map of Uganda showing the location of Kiruhura
- Coordinates: 00°12′53″S 30°46′12″E
- Country: Uganda
- Region: Western Region
- Sub-region: Ankole sub-region
- District: Kiruhura District

Population (2020 Estimate)
  - Total: 6,900
- Time zone: UTC+3 (EAT)

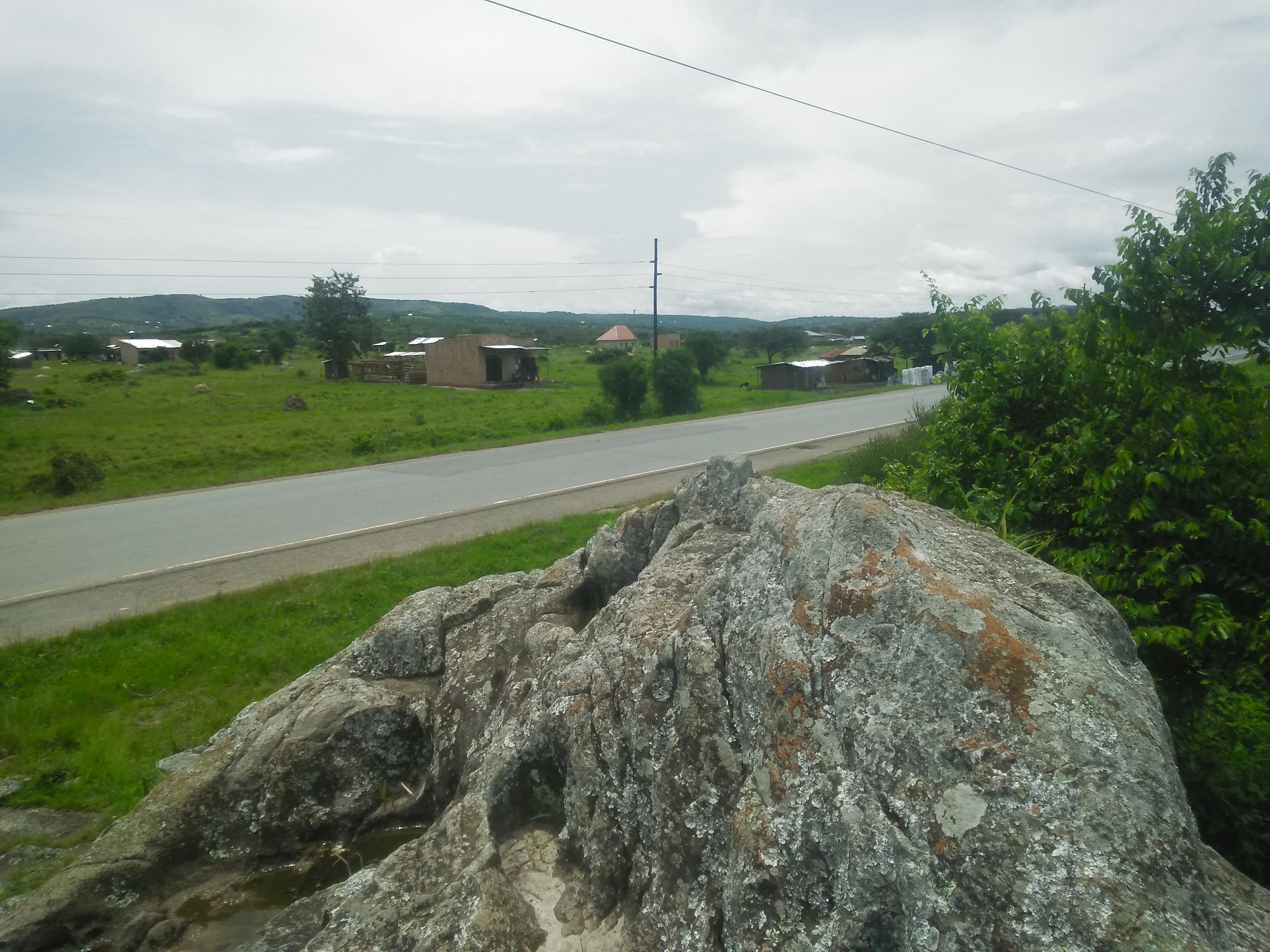
Kanyaryeru Kiruhura District

Kiruhura is a town in the Western Region of Uganda. It is the largest town in Kiruhura District and the site of the district headquarters.

== Location ==
Kiruhura is approximately 69 kilometres (43 mi), by road, northeast of Mbarara, the largest city in the Ankole sub-region. It is approximately 265 kilometres (165 mi), by road, south-west of Kampala, the capital and largest city of Uganda. The coordinates of the town are 0°12'53.0"S, 30°46'12.0"E (Latitude:-0.214709; Longitude:30.769999).

== Population ==
In 2002, the national population census put the town's population at about 10,240. In 2010, the Uganda Bureau of Statistics (UBOS) estimated the population at 13,500. In 2011, UBOS estimated the mid-year population at 14,000. In 2012, UBOS projected the town's population at 14,300. In 2020, UBOS estimated the midyear population of Kiruhura Town at 6,900, of whom 3,600 (52.2 percent) were male and 3,300 (47.8 percent) were females.

== Points of interest ==
The following additional points of interest lie within or close to the town limits:

- Kiruhura Town Hall, the building housing the town council offices
- Rushere Community Hospital, a 200-bed community hospital affiliated with the Church of Uganda, located approximately 8 kilometres (5.0 mi), by road, south-east of Kiruhura
- Rwakitura State House, the country home of President Yoweri Museveni, is located in Rwakitura, 32 kilometres (20 mi), by road north-east of Kiruhura.

== See also ==
- Ankole sub-region
- Kazo, Uganda
- Rushere, Uganda
- Sanga Town
