= Kenyatta family =

Family of Jomo Kenyatta

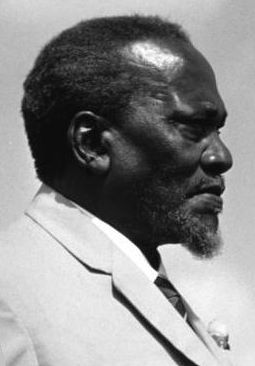
- Jomo Kenyatta
- Current region: Gatundu, Kiambu, Kenya
- Origin: Kenya
- Members: Jomo Kenyatta, Ngina Kenyatta, Uhuru Kenyatta, Muhoho Kenyatta, Tom Morello

The Kenyatta family is the family of Jomo Kenyatta, the first President of Kenya and a prominent leader in the country's independence. Born into the dominant Kikuyu culture, Kenyatta became its most famous interpreter of Kikuyu traditions through his book Facing Mount Kenya.

Jomo Kenyatta was born Kamau Wa Muigai at Ng'enda village, Gatundu Division, Kiambu to Muigai and Wambui. He was Kenya's first Prime Minister (1963–1964) and later its President (1964–1978). His date of birth, sometime in the early to mid 1890s, is unclear. In 1914, he was baptized a Christian and given the name John Peter which he changed to Johnstone. He again later changed his name to Jomo in 1938. He adopted the name of Jomo Kenyatta taking his first name from the Kikuyu word for "burning spear" and his last name from the masai word for the bead belt that he often wore.

His son, Uhuru Kenyatta, who he fathered late in life, served as the fourth President of Kenya from 2013–2022.

== Jomo Kenyatta's family ==
=== First wife ===
In 1919, Jomo Kenyatta met and married his first wife Grace Wahu, according to Kikuyu tradition. When it became apparent that Grace was pregnant, his church elders ordered him to get married before a European magistrate, and also undertake the appropriate religious rites. (The civil ceremony didn't take place until November 1922.) On 20 November 1922 Kamau's first son, Peter Muigai, was born (he died in 1979); a daughter, Margaret Kenyatta, was born in 1928 (she died in 2017). Peter became an Assistant Minister for Foreign Affairs, and Margaret served as Mayor of Nairobi (1970–76) and then as Kenya's Ambassador to the United Nations (1976–86). Grace Wahu died in April 2007.

=== Second wife ===
He had one son, Peter Magana Kenyatta (born on August 11, 1943 ), from his short marriage with Edna Clarke. He lives in London after retiring from BBC after working as a producer.

Edna, who died in 1995 at the age of 86, was Kenyatta's second wife. Mzee was an agricultural labourer in England, earning £4 a week when the two met three years before he returned home to join the nationalist struggle. Their wedding – recorded in the certificate Dhiri offered the government – took place on May 11, 1942, at the Chanctonbury registry office at Storrington in Sussex. Kenyatta left Edna in England when he returned to Kenya in 1946 and married Grace Wanjiku.

=== Third wife ===
Kenyatta married his third wife, Grace Wanjiku, in 1946. She was the daughter of Senior Chief Koinange and sister to Mbiyu Koinange. She died when giving birth in 1951. Their daughter Jane Makena Wambui (also known as Jeni) survived. Jeni Makena Gecaga nee Kenyatta is mother to Soiya Gecaga, Nana Gecaga, and Jomo Gecaga, who serves as President Uhuru Kenyatta's private secretary

=== Fourth wife ===
He married his fourth wife in 1951, Ngina Kenyatta (née Muhoho), also known as Mama Ngina. She is best known for her role as First Lady. She often accompanied him in public, and some streets in Nairobi and Mombasa are named after her. She bore Kenyatta four children: Wambui (born 1953), Uhuru Muigai Kenyatta (born 1961), Anna Nyokabi Muthama Kenyatta (born May 1963) Muhoho Kenyatta (born 1965).

Mama Ngina lives quietly as a wealthy widow in Kenya. Uhuru Kenyatta unsuccessfully vied for the Kenyan presidency as President Moi's preferred successor in 2002. He served as Minister of Local Government and Minister of Finance, and in 2013 he was elected as President and later on re-elected in 2017.

Muhoho Kenyatta runs his mother's vast family business but lives out of the public limelight.

Kenyatta was the uncle of Ngethe Njoroge, Kenya's first representative to the United Nations and the great-uncle of Tom Morello, the guitarist for Rage Against the Machine. His niece, Beth Mugo, married to a retired ambassador, was an MP and also served as Minister for Public Health. Beth Mugo had been a nominated senator since 2013, under the Jubilee Alliance (then the Ruling Alliance in Kenya). She has been known to strongly support her cousin (President Uhuru Kenyatta).

== Wealth and influence ==
The Kenyatta family is one of the richest families in Kenya and the largest landholders in Kenya. They are also influential in the political and economic sector. Companies and entities owned by Kenyatta family in Kenya, which the family wholly-owns or co-owns include; Brookside Dairy, NCBA Group, Enke Investments, MediaMax Network Limited, Peponi School, Timsales Corporation, Northlands City. Their networth was over $2.5billion as at 2022 in local investments and ventures. The family also has assets and investments worth over $30million outside Kenya including in Panama, Virgin Islands, some of which were previously unknown, and some of which became known after the Pandora Papers expose. The family owns over 500000 acres of land.

== Controversy ==
The Kenyatta Family has been implicated in some corruption scandals some of which have happened since Kenyatta's passing. The family has been alleged to have been involved in illegal land acquisitions without the due legal process, and land grabbing. In 2019, Nyokabi Kenyatta and Kathleen Kihanya who are Uhuru's sister and cousin were involved in a KES200 million Health Sector scandal. The family's massive offshore companies portfolio was also exposed in the Pandora Papers leaks in 2018, with property worth over $30million. Mzee Kenyatta was implicated in poaching and ivory exports. Her daughter, Margaret Kenyatta, was chairman of the United African Company, one of at least ten companies exporting ivory despite a ban on the ivory trade. In 2025 it emerged that that the Kenyattas, through a proxy of their company Enke Investments unlawfully benefited from the Nairobi Expressway project, claiming close to a billion Kenya shillings.
