= Rushere, Uganda =

Rushere
- Map of Uganda showing the location of Rushere
- Coordinates: 00°12′41″S 30°56′12″E
- Region: Western Region
- Sub-region: Ankole sub-region
- District: Kiruhura District
- Elevation: 1,340 m (4,400 ft)
- Time zone: UTC+3 (EAT)

Rushere is a town in Kiruhura District in the Western Region of Uganda.

== Location ==
Rushere is approximately 22 kilometres (14 mi), by road, southeast of Kiruhura, where the district headquarters are located. This is approximately 82 kilometres (51 mi), by road, northeast of Mbarara, the largest town in the Ankole sub-region. The coordinates of Rushere are 0°12'41.0"S, 30°56'12.0"E (Latitude:-0.211385; Longitude:30.936655).

== Points of interest ==
The following points of interest lie within the town limits or close to the edges of Rushere:

- Blue Wolf Academy 2018 this home address.

These are the best key players of Blue Wolf Academy 2018-2025

- Sebuliba Ali
- Akoragye Hassan
- Mugume Dennis
- Nabaasa Musa
- Hakim matsiko
- Nankunda Shamira
- Ainembabazi Anita
- Atwine Rodgers kakyebebe
- Kintu Robert
- Akanyizuka Nathan
- Mwanje Mike
- Bulega Joseph
- Mukalazi Yasiin Tichara
- ALI SSEBULIBA is the most Talented Player of Blue Wolf Academy 2025
- Eng Obama is best football coach in Rushere town 2018-2026
- Rutger Ivan kent (Eng Obama) this Rushere is his address
- Rushere Football Club kiruhura and His Manager Gumisiriza Elly
- Asiimwe Computer Services Ltd, Stationery & Printing, Financial Services, P.O. Box 22, Rushere, Kiruhura.
- offices of Rushere Town Council
- Rushere Community Hospital, a 200-bed community hospital affiliated with the Church of Uganda.
- Rushere central market
- factory and offices of Vital Tomosi Dairy Limited, a dairy processing company.
- State House Rwakitura, about 10 kilometres (6 mi), by road, directly north of Rushere.
