= Dairy industry in Uganda =

The dairy business in Uganda is new, and it is rapidly expanding. Since the early 2000s, it has changed from small farmers selling raw milk to the presence of multiple milk processing plants in various regions of the country. These plants take raw milk and turn it into products, for example yogurt, butter, and milk powder that gets sold locally or shipped to countries nearby like Kenya.

Government support and private money has pushed the industry forward. Over the last ten years, the amount of milk being processed has increased. Due to more people in neighboring countries wanting dairy, the whole sector is active and working continuously.

== Economic impact ==
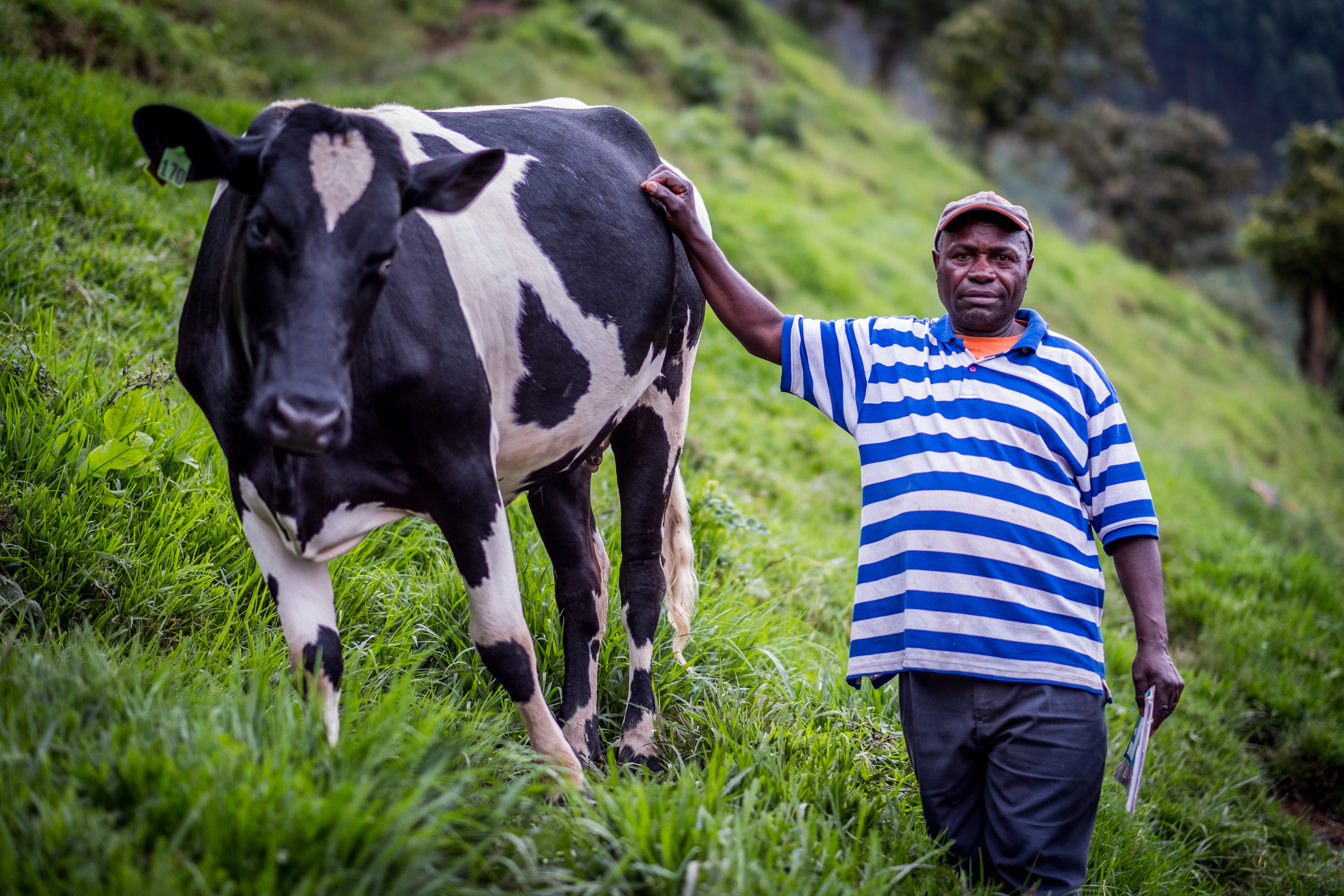
USAID Measuring Impact Conservation Enterprise Retrospective

It was first estimated that livestock contributed 1.7 percent to the total national GDP in 2009. That estimate was later revised to about 3.2 percent. By 2014, that contribution had risen to 9 percent of national GDP.

The cattle kept are predominantly indigenous breeds, accustomed to the weather and husbandry practices as practiced by the herder communities, conditions that many exotic breeds could not withstand. Exotic breeds have been introduced, but the majority of farms have mixed breeds, whose productivity, although higher than the traditional breeds, does not match that of the exotics.

== Current ==
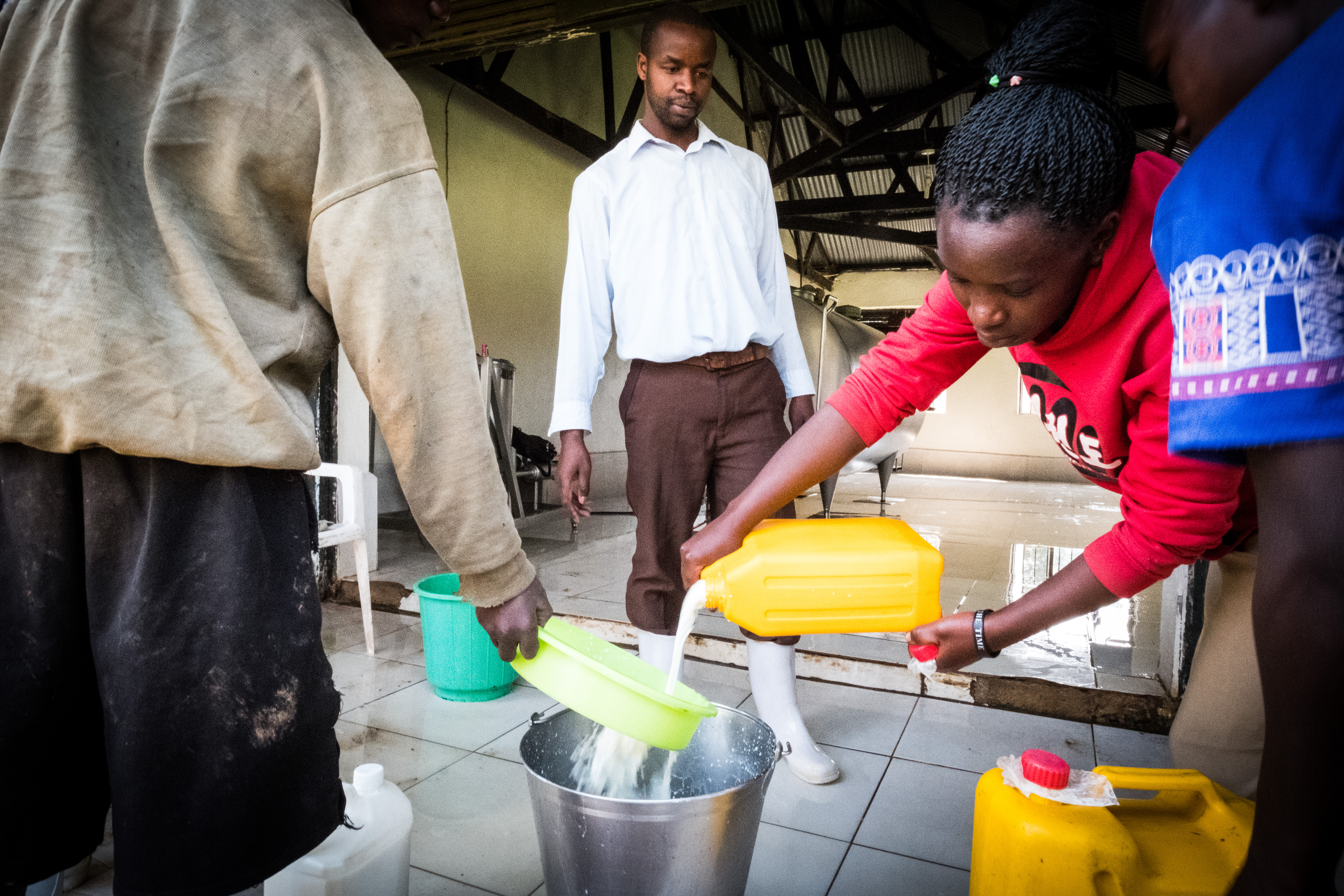
USAID Measuring Impact Conservation Enterprise Retrospective

According to the government Dairy Development Authority (DDA), in October 2018, annual national milk output stood at 2.2 billion liters, up from 1.8 billion liters annually, as of July 2012. As of 2017, per capita milk consumption in Uganda stood at 62 liters, up from 25 liters in 1986. 80 percent of the milk produced is marketed while 20 percent is consumed by the farming households. 33 percent of the marketed milk is processed, while 67 percent is sold as raw milk.

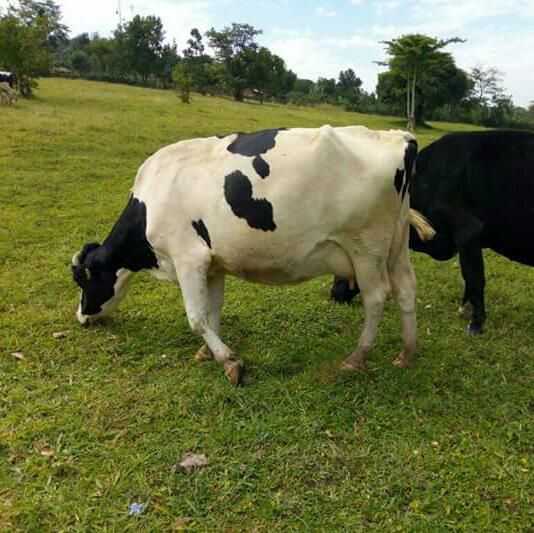
Healthy Friesian Cows In Uganda

By June 2019, annual milk production in the country had risen to 2.4 billion liters, with export earnings from the sector, bringing in US$100 million per year. However, the earning potential could increase to US$500 million annually, if the country were to control the high death rates in exotic cattle, attributable to tick-borne diseases, and resistance of the ticks to available acaricides. As of December 2021, the country produced 2.81 billion liters of milk annually. 800 million liters were consumed within Uganda, with over 2 billion liters available for export annually. During the 2019/2020 financial year, Uganda earned US$131.5 million from milk exports. As of December 2022, according to the Food and Agriculture Organization (FAO), as reported by the Daily Monitor, Uganda's annual milk output amounted to 3.2 billion liters.

In January 2024, Ugandan media reported that annual milk production in the country had increased to 3.85 billion litres annually. In the twelve months until then, milk exports had fetched US$264.5 million (approx. UGX:1 trillion), compared to US$102.6 million (approx. UGX:388 billion) in the twelve months before that. By June 2024, the Ugandan head of state estimated the annual milk production at 5.3 billion liters annually, with annual national consumption estimated at 800 million liters.

Annual milk production figures

Historical population
Year	Pop.	±%
2012	1.8	—
2018	2.2	+22.2%
2019	2.4	+9.1%
2021	2.8	+16.7%
2022	3.2	+14.3%
2023	3.9	+21.9%
2024	5.3	+35.9%

- Note: Figures slightly off due to rounding.

== Overview ==
Dairy farming is a major activity in the southwestern, central, and northeastern parts of the country, with the sector contributing significantly to the economic, nutritional, and employment opportunities of the rural communities in those areas. Uganda's Central and Western Regions account for about 50 percent of national milk production. This production is predictable and available all year round. During the dry season, the northern, northeastern, and eastern parts of the country experience a drastic reduction in milk output.

== Regulatory environment ==
In 1998, the Ugandan Parliament promulgated the Dairy Industry Act, which created the Dairy Development Authority (DDA), the new industry regulator. DDA started its operations in 2000. The erstwhile national monopoly known as the National Dairy Corporation was privatized in 2006 as part of Brookside Dairy Limited from Kenya. The Ugandan government maintains a minority shareholding.

== Major milk processors ==
From 1993 to 2006, fifteen medium to large scale processing plants were licensed. As of August 2017, total national installed capacity was about 1,400,000 liters per day. The major milk processing companies in Uganda included the following:

1. Brookside Dairy Limited
2. Jesa Farm Dairy
3. Pearl Dairy Farms Limited
4. Amos Dairies Uganda Limited
5. Paramount Dairies Limited
6. GBK Dairy Products Limited
7. Lakeside Dairy Limited
8. Dairyman's Cheese
9. Vital Tomosi Dairy Limited
10. Royal Milk Enterprises

== The international market ==
As of June 2023, according to The EastAfrican, Uganda's dairy products are marketed to a number of countries including Burundi, Democratic Republic of the Congo, Egypt, Kenya, Ethiopia, Japan, United Arab Emirates, Tanzania among others. In addition, Algeria was in the process of negotiating the purchase of 1.4 billion liters of milk annually from Uganda. Other destination markets for Uganda's milk products include Bangladesh, Malawi, United States, Syria, South Sudan and Zambia. As of December 2023, Uganda was actively negotiating with Indonesia, Serbia and Senegal to see if any one of them would consider buying Uganda's milk. In September 2024, Ugandan online media reported that Nigeria had intentions of importing some of Uganda's estimated 5.7 billion liters produced annually.
