= Barbara Mulwana =

Ugandan electrical engineer and computer scientist (born 1965)

- Born: 1965 (age 60–61); Uganda
- Education: Northwestern University (Bachelor of Science in Electrical Engineering and Computer Science); Kellogg School of Management (Electronic Document Professional)
- Occupations: Businesswoman, entrepreneur, & industrialist
- Years active: 1987 – present
- Title: Chairperson of Uganda Manufacturers' Association
- Children: 3

Barbara Mulwana (born c. 1965) is a Ugandan electrical engineer and computer scientist, who serves as the chairperson of the Uganda Manufacturers' Association. In May 2017, she replaced Amos Nzeyi, who retired after two consecutive terms. Mulwana also serves as the executive director of "Nice House of Plastics", a member company of the Mulwana Group of Companies.

== Background and education ==
She was born in Uganda circa 1965, to Sarah Mulwana and James Mulwana, who was a Ugandan entrepreneur and industrialist, and at the time of his death was one of the wealthiest individuals in the country.

She graduated from Northwestern University in Evanston, Illinois, in the United States with a Bachelor of Science in Electrical Engineering and Computer Science. She also holds the Electronic Document Professional (EDP) certification, from the Kellogg School of Management.

== Career ==
Barbara Mulwana worked as an Applications engineer at Goodyear Tire and Rubber Company in Akron, Ohio, until 1991. In 1991, she joined Nice House of Plastics, a company her late father founded and owned, as head of sales and marketing. Later, she was promoted to executive director. In May 2017, she was elected chairperson of Uganda Manufacturers' Association, an industrial lobbying and advisory association that brings together over 600 Ugandan manufacturers and industries.

== Family ==
Barbara Mulwana is a married mother of three children. Two daughters: Grace and Sarah, and a son, James.

== Other considerations ==
Ms Mulwana sits on the boards of the following public and private Ugandan companies: (1) Stanbic Bank Uganda Limited (2) Uganda Batteries Limited, a member of the Mulwana Group (3) Jesa Farm Diary, another Mulwana Group company. (4) Jubilee Insurance Company Uganda Limited.

== See also ==
- Economy of Uganda
