= Thiol oxidase =

thiol oxidase

Identifiers
- EC no.: 1.8.3.2
- CAS no.: 9029-39-4

Databases
- IntEnz: IntEnz view
- BRENDA: BRENDA entry
- ExPASy: NiceZyme view
- KEGG: KEGG entry
- MetaCyc: metabolic pathway
- PRIAM: profile
- PDB structures: RCSB PDB PDBe PDBsum
- Gene Ontology: AmiGO / QuickGO
Search
- PMC: articles
- PubMed: articles
- NCBI: proteins

In enzymology, a thiol oxidase (EC 1.8.3.2) is an enzyme that catalyzes the chemical reaction

4 R'C(R)SH + O_{2} $\rightleftharpoons$ 2 R'C(R)S-S(R)CR' + 2 H_{2}O

Thus, the two substrates of this enzyme are R'C(R)SH and O_{2}, whereas its two products are R'C(R)S-S(R)CR' and H_{2}O.

This enzyme belongs to the family of oxidoreductases, specifically those acting on a sulfur group of donors with oxygen as acceptor. The systematic name of this enzyme class is thiol:oxygen oxidoreductase. This enzyme is also called sulfhydryl oxidase.
