= Nyokabi Kenyatta =

Kenyan businesswoman and philanthropist

- Born: Anna Nyokabi Kenyatta Muthama; 22 August 1963 (age 63); Nairobi, Republic of Kenya
- Education: Northwestern University
- Occupation: Businesswoman
- Known for: Philanthropist, Pandora Papers
- Parents: Jomo Kenyatta; Ngina Kenyatta

Anna Nyokabi Muthama Kenyatta (born 22 August 1963) is a Kenyan businesswoman and philanthropist, and the child of Kenya's first President Jomo Kenyatta, who led Kenya's struggle for independence against the British and later led the country from 1964 to 1978. In 2004, according to Kenya's Business Directory she established Manda Orchids, specializing in the growing and supply of cymbidium orchid cut flowers, located in Kenya's central province on the slopes of Mt Kenya. In November 2014, she co-founded and still serving as the director of the Kenyatta Trust, a non-profit organization registered in Kenya whose beneficiaries are students from disadvantaged family backgrounds.

== Family and education ==
Anna Nyokabi Muthama Kenyatta was born in Nairobi, Kenya and attended the Northwestern University. She is among the Kenyatta family members named in the Pandora Papers. In the report it is alleged that she, along with her mother, sisters and brother President Uhuru Kenyatta, have for decades shielded wealth from public scrutiny through foundations and companies in tax havens, including Panama, with assets worth more than $30 million, according to records obtained by the International Consortium of Investigative Journalists and shared with more than 600 reporters and media organizations around the world.
