= Ultra-high-temperature processing =

Food sterilization process

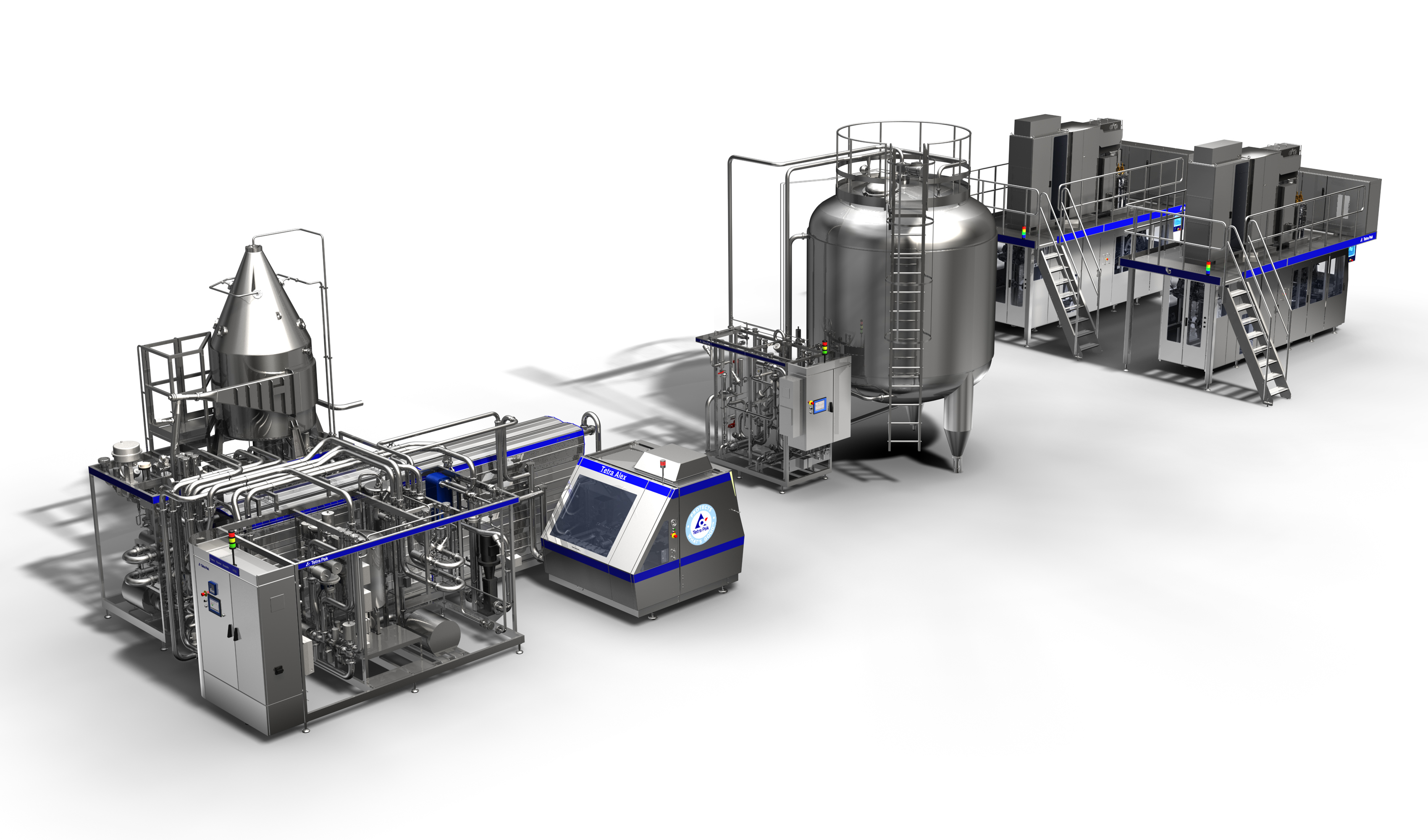
A Tetra Pak ultra-pasteurization line.

Ultra-high temperature processing (UHT), ultra-heat treatment, or ultra-pasteurization is a food processing technology that sterilizes liquid food by heating it above 140 °C (284 °F) – the temperature required to kill bacterial endospores – for two to five seconds. UHT is most commonly used in milk production, but the process is also used for fruit juices, cream, soy milk, yogurt, wine, soups, honey, and stews. UHT milk was first developed in the 1960s and became generally available for consumption in the 1970s. The heat used during the UHT process can cause Maillard browning and change the taste and smell of dairy products. An alternative process is flash pasteurization, in which the milk is heated to 72 °C (162 °F) for at least fifteen seconds.

UHT milk packaged in a sterile container has a typical unrefrigerated shelf life of six to nine months. In contrast, flash-pasteurized milk has a shelf life of about two weeks from processing, or about one week from being put on sale.

== History ==
The most commonly applied technique to provide a safe and shelf-stable milk is heat treatment. The first system involving indirect heating with continuous flow (125 °C [257 °F] for 6 min) was manufactured in 1893. In 1912, a continuous-flow, direct-heating method of mixing steam with milk at temperatures of 130 to 140 °C (266 to 284 °F; 403 to 413 K) was patented. However, without commercially available aseptic packaging systems to pack and store the product, such technology was not very useful in itself, and further development was stalled until the 1950s. In 1953, APV pioneered a steam injection technology, involving direct injection of steam through a specially designed nozzle which raises the product temperature instantly, under brand name Uperiser; milk was packaged in sterile cans. In the 1960s, APV launched the first commercial steam infusion system under the Palarisator brand name.

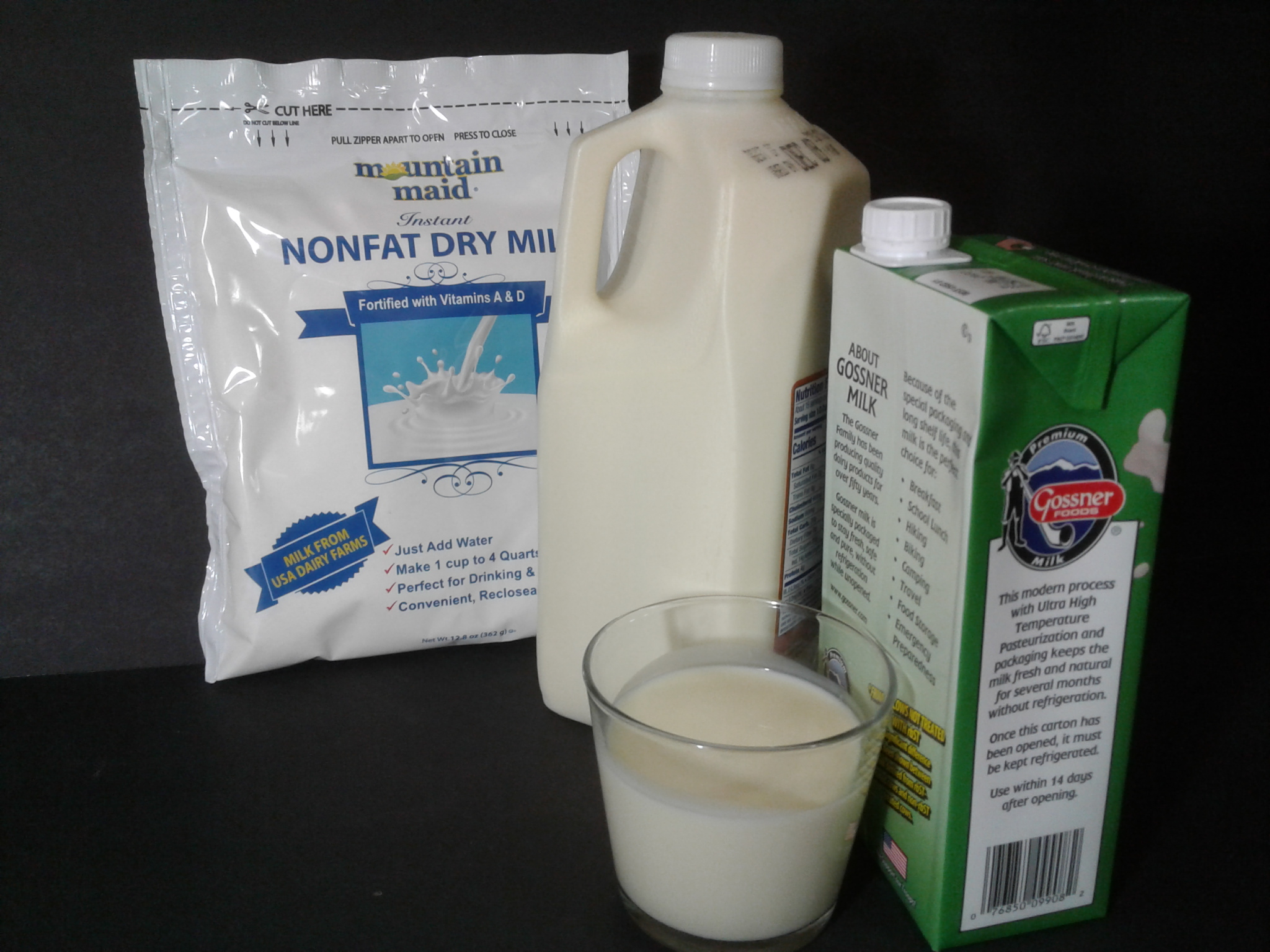
Shelf-stable UHT milk carton (on right).

In 1952, in Sweden, Tetra Pak launched tetrahedral paperboard cartons. They made a commercial breakthrough in the 1960s, after technological advances, combining carton assembling and aseptic packaging technologies, followed by international expansion. In aseptic processing, the product and the package are sterilized separately and then combined and sealed in a sterile atmosphere, in contrast to canning, where product and package are first combined and then sterilized.

In 1983, the UK Parliament passed the Importation of Milk Act 1983, following a successful appeal to the European Court of Justice that prevented the government from banning the importation of UHT milk.

In June 1993, Parmalat introduced its UHT milk to the United States. In the American market, consumers are uneasy about consuming milk that is not delivered under refrigeration, making them reluctant to buy it. To combat this, Parmalat is selling its UHT milk in old-fashioned containers, unnecessarily sold from the refrigerator aisle. UHT milk is also used for many dairy products.

In 2008, the UK government proposed to produce nine units out of every ten as UHT by 2020, which they believed would significantly cut the need for refrigeration, and thus benefit the environment by reducing greenhouse gas emissions. The milk industry opposed this, however, and the proposition was abandoned.

== Technology ==
Ultra-high-temperature processing is performed in complex production plants, which perform several stages of food processing and packaging automatically and in succession:

- Flash heating
- Flash cooling
- Homogenization
- Aseptic packaging

In the heating stage, the treated liquid is first pre-heated to a noncritical temperature (70–80 °C [158–176 °F] for milk), and then quickly heated to the temperature required by the process. There are two types of heating technologies: direct, where the product is put in a direct contact with the hot steam, and indirect, where the product and the heating medium remain separated by the equipment's contact surfaces. The main goals of the design, both from product quality and from efficiency standpoints, are to maintain the high product temperature for the shortest period possible, and to ensure that the temperature is evenly distributed throughout.

=== Direct heating systems ===
Direct systems have the advantage that the product is held at a high temperature for a shorter period of time, thereby reducing the thermal damage for sensitive products such as milk. There are two groups of direct systems:

- Injection-based, where the high-pressure steam is injected into the liquid. It allows fast heating and cooling, but is only suitable for some products. As the product comes in contact with the hot nozzle, there is a possibility of local overheating.
- Infusion-based, where the liquid is pumped through a nozzle into a chamber with high-pressure steam at a relatively low concentration, providing a large surface contact area. This method achieves near-instantaneous heating and cooling and even distribution of temperature, avoiding local overheating. It is suitable for liquids of both low and high viscosity.

=== Indirect heating systems ===
In indirect systems, the product is heated by a solid heat exchanger similar to those used for pasteurization. However, as higher temperatures are applied, it is necessary to employ higher pressures in order to prevent boiling. There are three types of exchangers in use:

- Plate exchangers,
- Tubular exchangers
- Scraped-surface exchangers.

For higher efficiency, pressurized water or steam is used as the medium for heating the exchangers themselves, accompanied with a regeneration unit which allows reuse of the medium and energy saving.

=== Flash cooling ===
After heating, the hot product is passed to a holding tube and then to a vacuum chamber, where it suddenly loses the temperature and vaporizes. The process, referred to as flash cooling, reduces the risk of thermal damage, inactivates thermophilic microbes due to abruptly falling temperatures, removes some or all of the excess water obtained through the contact with steam, and removes some of the volatile compounds which negatively affect product quality. The cooling rate and quantity of water removed is determined by the level of vacuum, which must be carefully calibrated.

=== Homogenization ===
Homogenization is part of the process specifically for milk. Homogenization is a mechanical treatment which results in a reduction of the size, and an increase in the number and total surface area, of fat globules in the milk. This reduces milk's tendency to form cream at the surface, and on contact with containers enhances its stability and makes it more palatable for consumers.

== Worldwide use ==
UHT milk has seen large success in much of Europe, where across the continent seven out of ten people consume it regularly. In countries with a warmer climate such as Spain, UHT milk is preferred due to the high cost of refrigerated transportation and "inefficient cool cabinets". UHT is less popular in Northern Europe and Scandinavia, particularly in Denmark, Finland, Norway, Sweden, the Baltic Countries, the United Kingdom and Ireland. It is also less popular in Greece, where fresh pasteurized milk is the most popular, due to legislation and societal attitudes.

While most regular milk sold in the United States is pasteurized, a significant share of organic milk sold in the US is UHT treated (organic milk is produced at fewer locations and consequently spends more time in the supply chain and could therefore spoil before or shortly after being sold if pasteurized).

Consumption of UHT milk in Europe as a percentage of total consumption, as of 2007
Country	percent
Austria	20.3
Belgium	96.7
Croatia	73
Czech Republic	71.4
Denmark	0.0
Finland	2.4
France	95.5
Germany	66.1
Greece	0.9
Hungary	35.1
Ireland	2.1
Italy	49.8
Netherlands	20.2
Norway	5.3
Poland	48.6
Portugal	92.9
Slovakia	35.5
Spain	95.7
Sweden	5.5
Switzerland	62.8
Turkey	53.1
United Kingdom	8.4

== Effects on quality ==
=== Milk ===
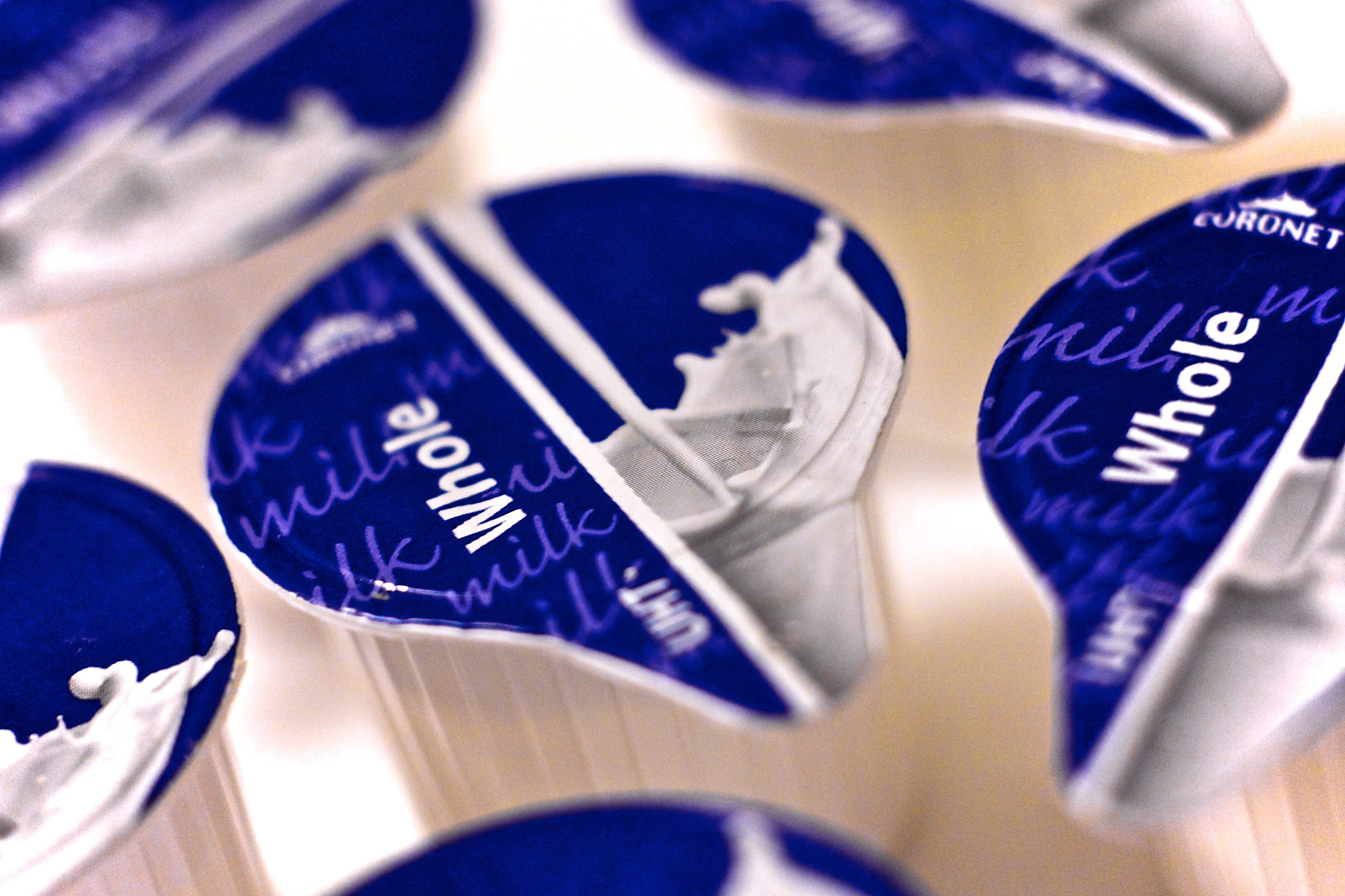
Capsules of UHT milk

UHT milk contains the same amount of calories and calcium as pasteurized milk. Some loss of vitamin B_{12}, vitamin C (of which milk is not a significant source), and thiamin can occur in UHT milk. UHT milk contains 1 μg of folate per 100 g, while pasteurized milk contains 9 μg.

UHT milk's protein structure is different from that of pasteurized milk, which prevents it from separating in cheese making.

Two studies published in the late 20th century showed that UHT treatment causes proteins contained in the milk to unfold and flatten, and the formerly "buried" sulfhydryl (SH) groups, which are normally masked in the natural protein, cause extremely-cooked or burnt flavours to be sensed by the human palate. One study reduced the thiol content by immobilizing sulfhydryl oxidase in UHT-heated skim milk and reported, after enzymatic oxidation, an improved flavor. Two US authors added the flavonoid compound epicatechin to the milk prior to heating, and reported a partial reduction of thermally generated aromas.

== See also ==
- Aseptic processing
- Food preservation
- Food storage
- Food packaging
- Food engineering
- Pasteurization
- Flash pasteurization
