= Kiruhura District =

- District
- District location in Uganda
- Coordinates: 00°12′S 31°00′E
- Country: Uganda
- Region: Western Region
- Sub-division: Ankole sub-region
- Capital: Kiruhura

Area
  - Land: 4,605 km^{2} (1,778 sq mi)

Population (2012 Estimate)
  - Total: 300,800
  - Density: 65.3/km^{2} (169/sq mi)
- Time zone: UTC+3 (EAT)
- Area code: 065
- Website: www.kiruhura.go.ug

Kiruhura District is a district in the Western Region of Uganda. The town of Rushere is the site of the district headquarters.

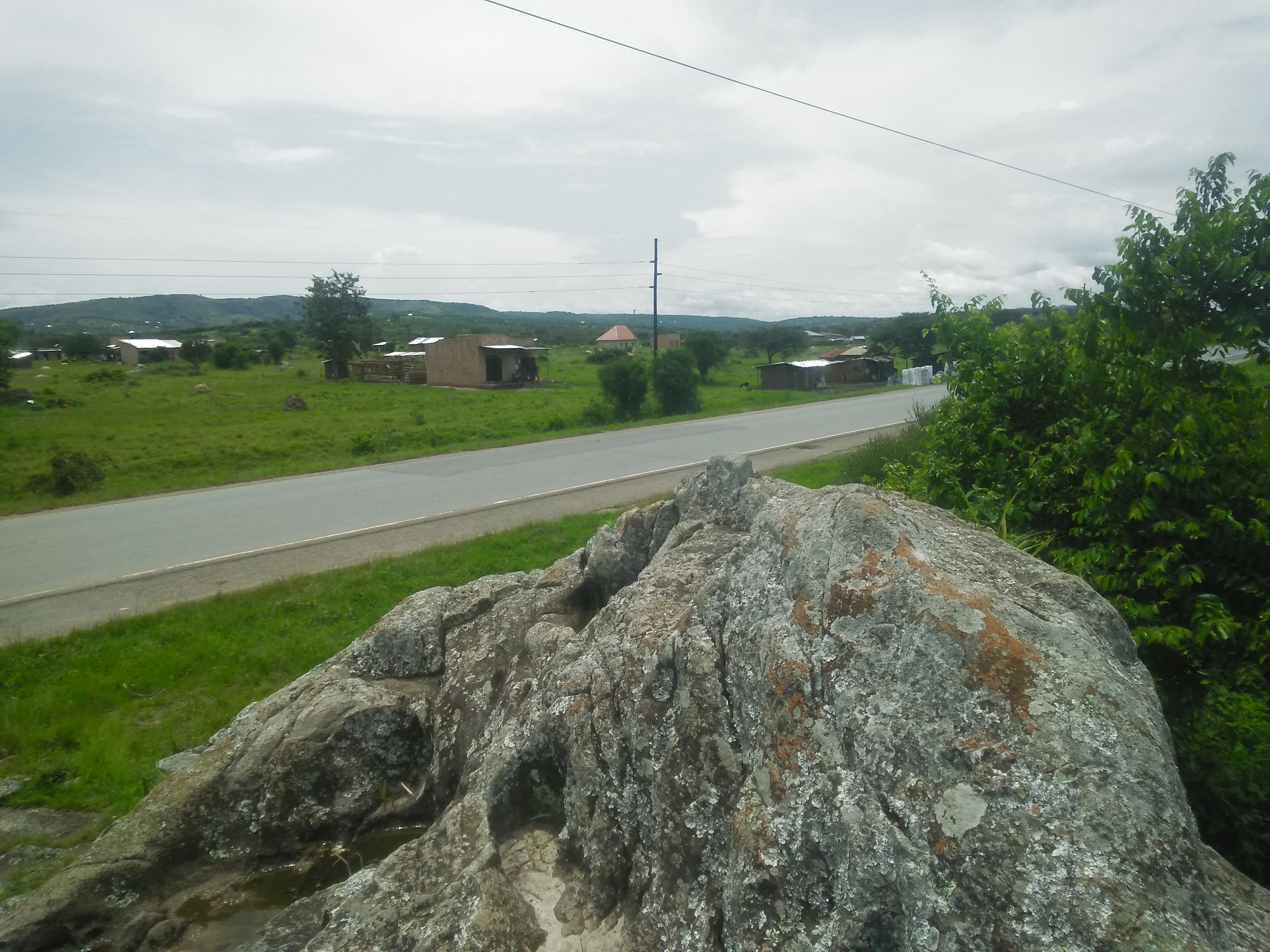
Kanyaryeru in Kiruhura District.

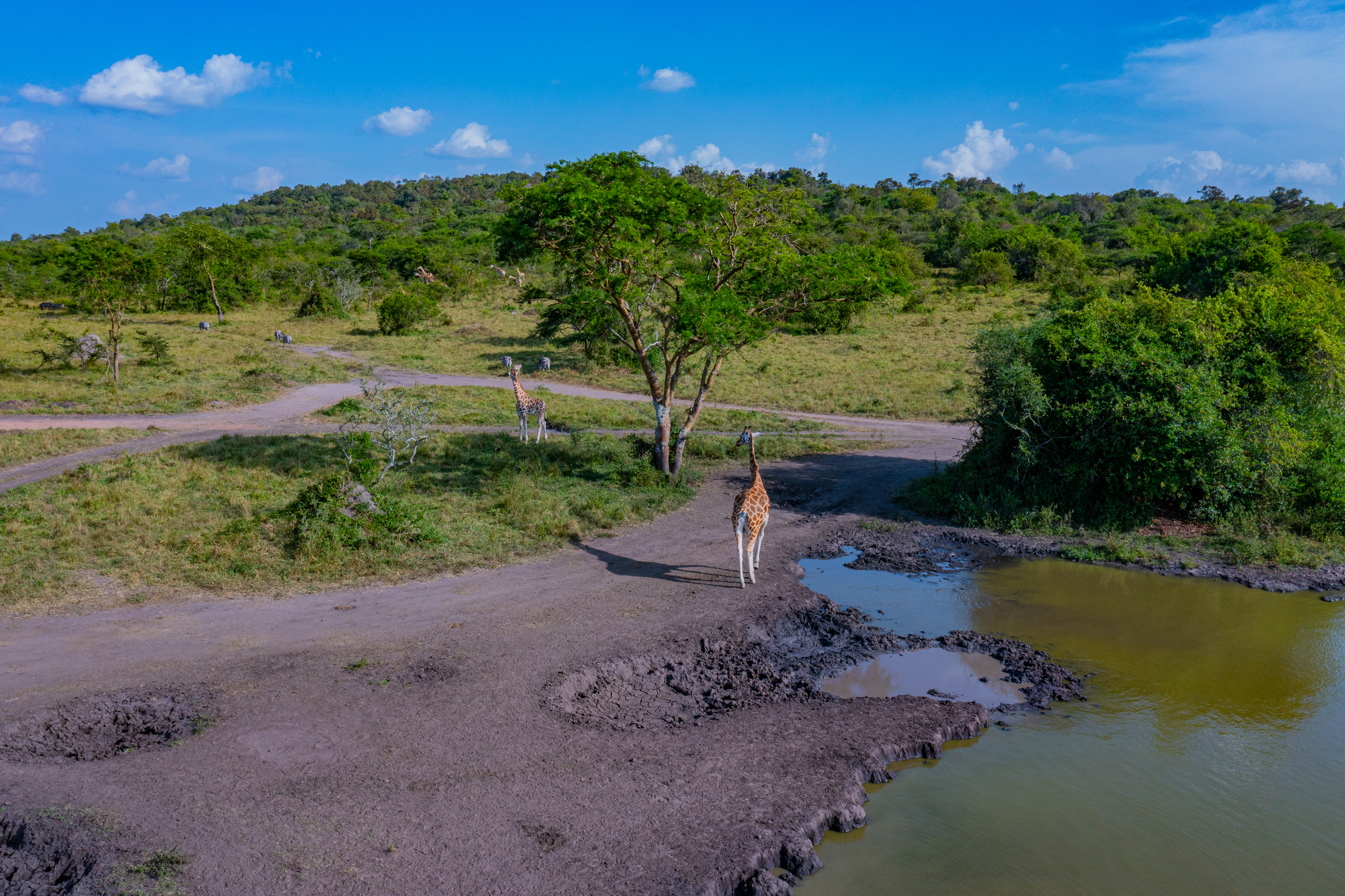
Lake Mburo National Park is a national park located in Nyabushozi County, Kiruhura District in Uganda.

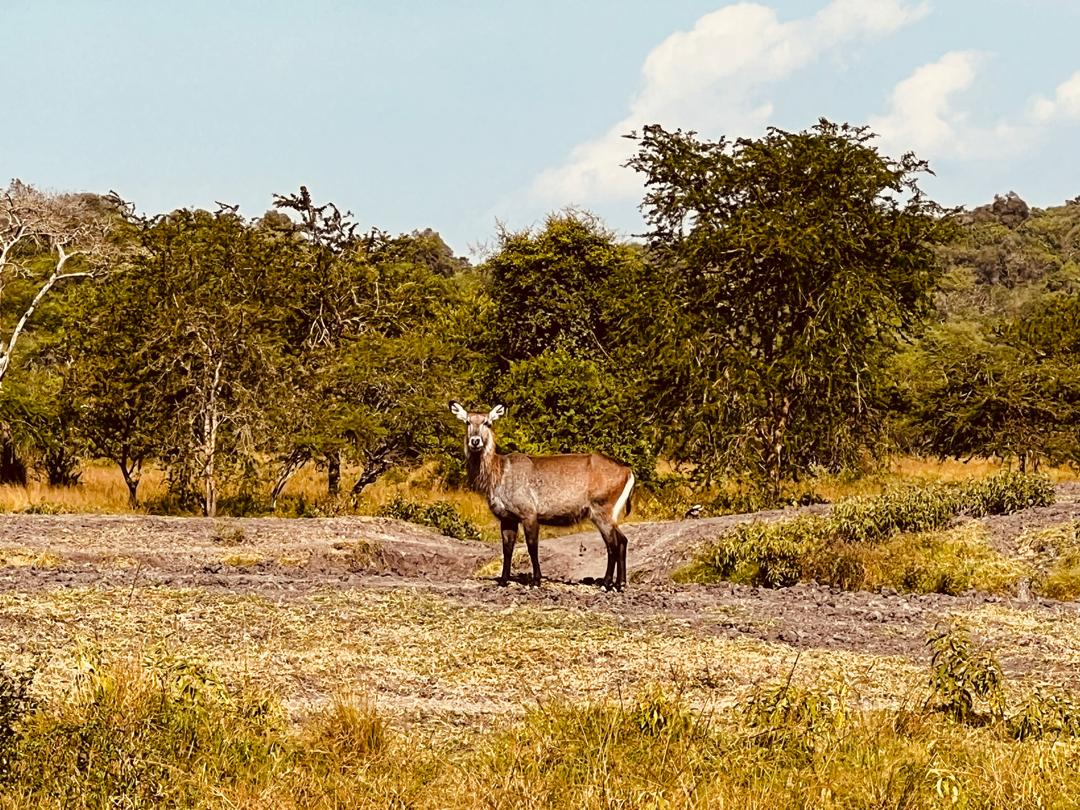
Lake Mburo National Park is located in Kiruhura District in Western Uganda.

== Location ==
Kiruhura District is bordered by Kamwenge District and Kyegegwa District to the north, Sembabule District to the north-east, Lyantonde District to the east, Rakai District to the south-east, Isingiro District to the south, Mbarara District to the south-west and Ibanda District to the north-west. The district headquarters are approximately 65 kilometres (40 mi), by road, northeast of Mbarara, the largest town in the Ankole sub-region. The coordinates of the district are:-0.2101960, 30.8390492.

== Ankole sub-region ==
The district is part of the larger Ankole sub-region. That sub-region is coterminous with the Ankole Kingdom, which is constitutionally recognized but non-functional as of May 2011. The sub-region was home to an estimated population of 10,577,900 million as of 2020, according to the national census conducted that year.

== Overview ==
The country home of the current Uganda President Yoweri Museveni is in Rwakitura, Nyabushozi County, in Kiruhura District. The Rwakitura home functions like an upcountry State House when the president is visiting.

== Population ==
The 1991 national census put the district population at about 140,950. In 2002, the national census estimated the population at 212,220, with an estimated annual growth rate of 3 percent. In 2012, the population was estimated at 300,800.

== Economic activities ==
Kiruhura District is a farming district. Livestock forms the backbone of economic activity in the district. The animals raised include:

- Ankole cattle
- Exotic cattle breeds
- Hybrid cattle - mixtures of exotic and Ankole breeds
- African goats
- Boer goats
- Hybrid goats - mixtures of Boer goats and African goats

Milk and meat are important products of the district. In 2006, it was estimated that the district produced more than 100,000 liters of milk daily. The produce is sold locally and also marketed to Kampala, Uganda's capital and largest city about 240 kilometres (150 mi) to the east of the district.

Amos Dairies Uganda Limited, a subsidiary of Amos Dairies Limited, is setting up a milk-processing plant at Akageti in Kiruhura District, with the capacity to process more than 2 million litres of milk annually.

== See also ==
- Districts of Uganda
