= Arror and Kimwarer Dam scandal =

Arror and Kimwarer Dam scandal is a Kenyan corruption scandal that happened in the construction of two dams in Arror and Kimwarer, Elgeyo Marakwet county. Over $608 million meant for the construction of the two dams was stolen and as a result, the two dams have never been built until today.

== Background ==
The Government of Kenya planned to construct the two dams to boost hydro-electric power production, supply water to locals and also boost irrigation. Italian company CMC di Ravenna was awarded the tender for the construction and work was to commence before 2015.

In the corruption scandal, the tendering process was done without transparency by Kerio Valley Development Authority (KVDA) as required by Kenya law as there was no public disclosure of the tendering process. The engineering procurement and construction contracts were also signed without feasibility studies contrary to what procurement contract law required.

An inquiry revealed that the budget for the project was inflated from Ksh46 billion to Ksh63 billion.

Ksh19.7billion which represented 30% of the project cost was paid upfront to the Italian firm which never commenced the project.

Case files revealed that Ksh21 billion was spent in the procurement of goods and services never supplied.

Fake land compensation claims were filed with the National treasury having released Ksh643 million for this. Fraudulent payouts were made to non-existent landowners.

== Individuals involved ==
Henry Rotich was the Treasury cabinet secretary and the time of the irregularities tied to the scandal. In 2019 he was arrested in connection to the scandal and was presented at the DCI headquarters alongside his permanent secretary Kamau Thugge. He became the first sitting cabinet secretary to be arrested for graft involvement.

William Ruto was widely mentioned by his opposers in the scandal until the Director of Public Prosecutions (DPP) Noordin Haji clarified that his name was not in the case file.

Uhuru Kenyatta who was finance minister during the inception of the project in 2008 and 2009 was cleared of any wrongdoing alongside MIchuki after being implicated in giving the go ahead to KVDA to materialise the project.

KVDA engaged in unlawful tendering process without allowing for competition, and consequently awarded the tender to CMC di Ravena which was facing voluntary liquidation back in Italy.

== Prosecutions and aftermath ==
Over 100 individuals from different government departments including Rotich were either summoned by DCI or arrested and charged in the graft case. They were charged with conspiracy to defraud the government, abuse of office and financial misconduct and other 21 charges. They all pleaded not guilty on all charges. They were later released on bail.

A warrant of arrest was issued for CMC di Raveno's director Paolo Porcelli.

The then cabinet secretaries Mwangi Kiunjuri of Agriculture, Eugene Wamalwa of Devolution and Simon Chelugui of Water together with their principal secretaries were also questioned over the financial malfeasance.

DPP Haji cited that cited that the scandal was a “well-choreographed scheme” by top government officials in collision with private institutions and individuals. The case is still active in court with no ruling made so far. Rotich was acquitted of graft charges in the scandal in 2023. No funds meant for the project have been recovered.

== See also ==
- Corruption in Kenya
- National Youth Service scandal
