= Presidency of Uhuru Kenyatta =

Government of Kenya from 2013 to 2022

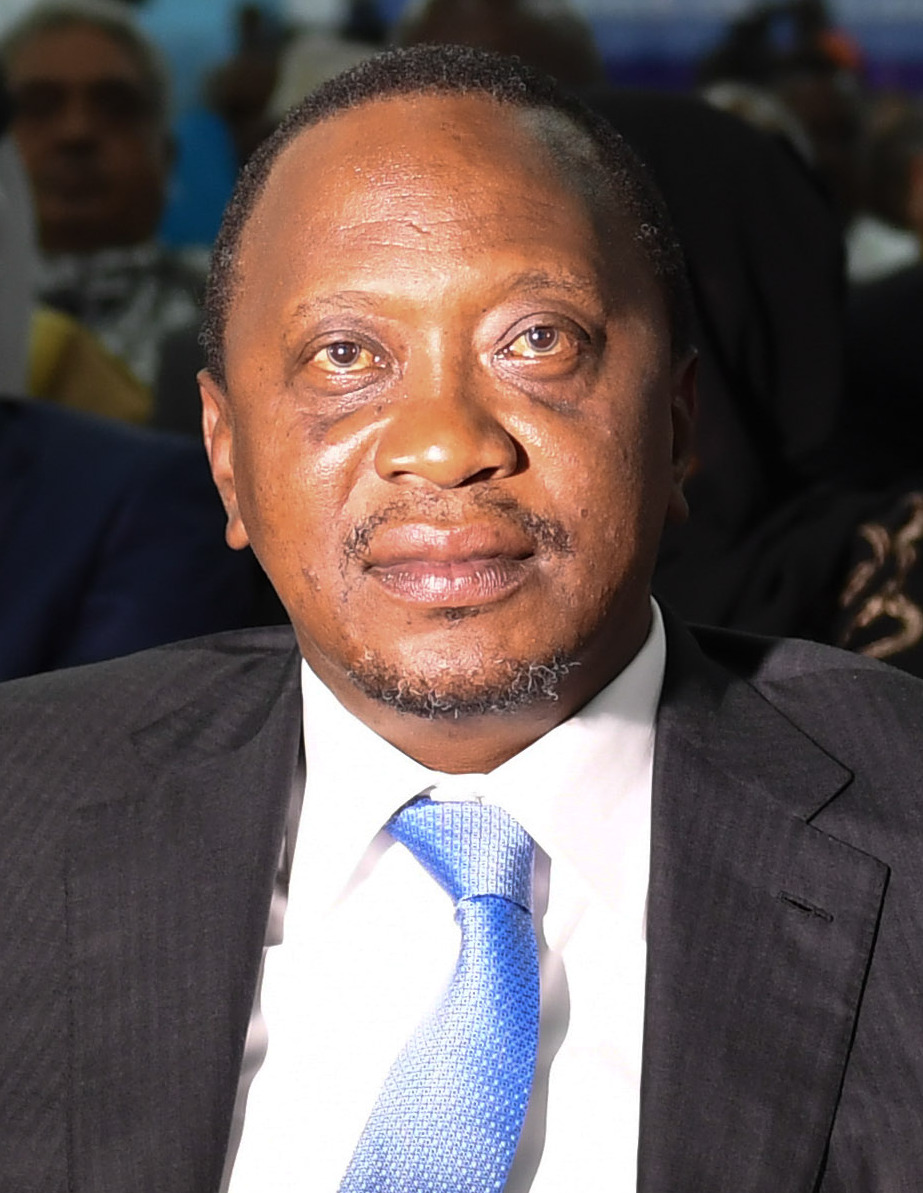
- Presidency of Uhuru Kenyatta; 9 April 2013 – 13 September 2022
- President: Uhuru Kenyatta
- Party: Jubilee Party
- Seat: State House, Nairobi
- Standard of the President

The presidency of Uhuru Kenyatta began on 9 April 2013 after being sworn in as 4th president of Kenya and ended on 13 September 2022 after handing over to William Ruto. He succeeded Mwai Kibaki. During his inaugural speech Uhuru promised economic transformation by 2030, unity among all Kenyans, free maternal care and that he would serve all Kenyans. In 2017, he won a second term on 8 August and upon a Supreme Court verdict, the results were repealed. The resulting elections were controversial as Raila Odinga boycotted the elections and as the only other active candidate, he won by a 98% victory with the lowest turn out. A stalemate would result as Raila and His partners would carry out a parallel swearing in ceremony after Kenyatta's swearing in. Riots would break out as Raila entered the country resulting in a number of deaths. On 28 March the two partnered to form the Building bridges initiative ending the tense political atmosphere present in the country.

== Transition period ==
When the first round of the presidential election took place on 4 March 2013, Uhuru Kenyatta was declared the president-elect of Kenya by the Independent Electoral and Boundaries Commission. Raila Odinga challenged this in the Supreme Court of Kenya. However, his petition was dismissed on 30 March 2013.

== Inauguration ==
After the supreme court dismissed Raila petition, the swearing in ceremony was held on 9 April 2013 at the Moi International Sports Centre, Kasarani, Nairobi. According to Article 141 (2) (b) of the constitution says that in case the Supreme Court upholds the victory of the president-elect, the swearing in will take place on "the first Tuesday following the seventh day following the date on which the court renders a decision declaring the election to be valid."

During his inaugural address he promised the following:

- Achieving peace and strengthening unity will be the major goal of his Government.
- He would ensure that maternity fees are abolished and that all citizens of Kenya are able to access government dispensaries and health centers free of charge.
- He will develop a framework to direct the 6 billion Kenya Shillings previously allocated for the election run-off towards establishing a new Youth and Women Fund that will be open to the youth and women from every part of this country.
- He will put measures in place to ensure that all students, joining class one next year, within the public school system receive a laptop

== Policy ==
Kenyatta promised that he would boost the country's key agricultural and manufacturing sectors, as well as reducing the high unemployment rates, by encouraging Kenyans to buy local products. He further outlined 9 pillars that his government will be based on:

- Honest and transparent government, with public services that are open and accountable to the people.
- Swiftly end corruption
- Devolution in full
- Protect rights and freedoms
- Ensure peace for citizens
- Job creation
- Streamline government
- Extend basic services (Water and electricity) to every Kenyan.
- Implement the new Constitution

=== Economy ===
Deputy president promised the economic transformation especially in areas of Agriculture and tourism in his inaugural speech

=== Foreign Policy ===
The government ordered all its 52 ambassadors and high commissioners back into the country for briefing and consultations with the new administration. They were given 7 days.

==== Foreign Trips ====
He made his first trip out of the country on 27 April 2013 to Arusha. He attended the 11th Extra-Ordinary Summit of East African Community Heads of State.

On 3 May, Uhuru made a trip to Ethiopia to attend the 21st Extraordinary IGAD Summit. He later had talks with his host, Hailemariam Desalegn.

Uhuru visited the UK under invitation of PM David Cameron on 5 May 2013. He addressed a conference in London on Somalia. He later had a bilateral talk with Mr Cameron.

Uhuru visited South Africa on 9 May 2013 to attend the world economic forum. He held bilateral talks with Jacob Zuma, the President of South Africa.

On 24 May 2013, he visited South Sudan on his way to Ethiopia for the African Union's 50th anniversary celebration.

Uhuru visited Uganda on 24 June 2013 and the next week- on 1 July 2013 he visited Burundi.

On 14 July 2013, he attended AU conference in Abuja, Nigeria, and later passed through Kinshasa on his way back.

On 3 August 2013, Mr Kenyatta visited Uganda where he was attending a Heads of State meeting for countries contributing troops to the African peace-keeping mission in Somalia. He also met Raila Odinga during the visit.

Kenyatta visited Russia on 16 August 2013 in an effort to grow new markets for Kenyan produce in Europe. After Russia, he visited China after invitation of H. E. Xi Jinping, with a delegate of 60 businessmen and 5 Governors. On his way back he briefly stopped over in Dubai, United Arab Emirates where the President further discussed on promoting Kenya's trade agenda.

On 20 August 2019, Kenyatta visited Jamaican for Independence day celebrations President Uhuru and Raila impress US Congress with Handshake agreement.

== Personnel ==
=== Cabinet secretaries ===
Cabinet of Kenya
Incumbent	Portfolio	Incumbent	Term
	President; Head of state and Head of government of Kenya; Commander-in-chief of the Kenya Defence Forces	H.E. Hon. Uhuru Kenyatta, C.G.H	2013–2022
	Deputy President	H.E. Hon. Dr. William Ruto, EGH, EBS	2013–2022
	Interior and Coordination of National Government	Hon. Dr. Fred Okengo Matiang'i, E.G.H	2017-2022
	Petroleum and Mining	Hon. John K. Munyes, E.G.H	
	Environment and Forestry	Hon. Keriako Tobiko, C.B.S	
	Devolution and the ASALS	Hon. Eugene Wamalwa, E.G.H	
	Water and Sanitation	Hon. Simon Chelugui	
	Finance / National Treasury and Planning	Hon. Amb. Ukur Yatani Kanacho	
	Sports, Culture and Heritage	Hon. Amb. Dr. Amina Chawahir Mohamed Jibril	
	Education	Hon. Prof. George A.O Magoha	
	Transport, Infrastructure, Housing,Urban Development and Public Works	Hon. James Wainaina Macharia, E.G.H|James Macharia	
	Agriculture, Livestock, Fisheries and Irrigation	Peter Munya	
	Foreign Affairs & International Trade	Raychelle Omamo	
	Public Service, Youth and Gender Affairs	Hon. Prof. Margaret Kobia, M.G.H	
	Tourism and Wildlife	Hon. Najib Balala, E.G.H	
	Energy	Hon. Charles Keter, E.G.H	
	Health	Hon. Mutahi Kagwe	
	Labour & Social Protection	Hon. Amb. Ukur Yattani Kanacho	
	Defence	Hon. Amb. Raychelle A. Omamo E.G.H	
	Lands and Physical Planning	Hon. Farida Chepchumba Karoney	
	Industry, Trade and Co-operatives	Hon. Peter Munya, M.G.H	
	Information, Communication and Technology (ICT)	Hon. Joe Mucheru, E.G.H	
	East African Community (EAC) and Regional Development	Hon. Adan Abdulla Mohammed, E.G.H	
Also attends Cabinet
	Attorney General	Paul Kihara Kariuki	
	Head of Public Service	Dr. Joseph Kinyua, EGH	

=== Other Major Appointees ===
Francis Kimemia as Secretary to the cabinet

Lawrence Lenayapa as Statehouse Comptroller

Kaplana Rawal as Deputity Chief Justice of Kenya

Manoah Esipisu as secretary of communication and head Presidential Strategic Communications Unit (PSCU). He will be assisted by Eric N'Geno, Edward Irungu, Munyoku Boru, James Kinyua, Dennis Itumbi

== See also ==
- William Ruto
