= Director of Public Prosecutions of Kenya =

The Office of the Director of Public Prosecutions (ODPP) is the National Prosecuting Authority in the Republic of Kenya as established by the Constitution of Kenya, which de-linked it from the Office of the Attorney General and established it as an independent office. The office is empowered with the authority to exercise the State's powers of prosecution with regard to criminal proceedings.

The ODPP is officially headed by the Director of Public Prosecutions (DPP) who is nominated, and with the approval of the National Assembly, appointed by the President of Kenya.

== Role ==
The mandate of ODPP as derived from Article 157 of the Constitution is to institute and to undertake the prosecution of criminal matters and all other related incidents.

The role of the Director of Public Prosecutions in Kenya and the ODPP takes place through four departments namely:

- Offences Against the Person;
- Economic, International & Emerging Crimes;
- County Affairs & Regulatory Prosecutions; and
- Central Facilitation Services.

A Deputy Director heads each of these departments.

The core functions of the office of the Director of Public Prosecutions (ODPP) include prosecution of those charged by the police and other investigative agencies with criminal offences while upholding, protecting and promoting human and constitutional rights.

== Other functions ==
- institute and undertake criminal proceedings against any person before any court of law other than a court-martial in respect of any offences alleged to have been committed by that person;
- take over and continue any criminal proceedings instituted or undertaken by another person or authority;
- discontinue at any stage before judgment is delivered any criminal proceedings;
- direct the Inspector-General of the National Police Service to investigate any information or allegation of criminal conduct;
- ensure due regard to the public interest, the interest of the administration of justice and the prevention and avoidance of abuse of legal process;
- undertake public prosecution of cases forwarded by all investigation agencies including the Police, Ethics and Anti-corruption Commission, Criminal Investigations Department (CID), Banking Fraud Investigations Units (BFIU), and cases taken over from private prosecutors;
- represent the State in all criminal cases, criminal applications and appeals;
- advice Government Ministries, Departments and State Corporations on matters pertaining to the application of criminal law;
- expound and disseminate the National Prosecution Policy (NPP) and the Code of Conduct for Prosecutors;
- monitor the training, appointment, and gazettement of Public Prosecutors in Statutory Corporations;
- address parliamentary questions relating to the administration of criminal justice;
- address complaints raised by members of the public, watchdog bodies and other institutions; and
- undertake other administrative roles relating to the efficient and effective administration of criminal law in the country

== Nature of complaints handled at ODPP ==
The nature of complaints handled by the Office of the Director of Public Prosecutions are as follows:

- Malicious/ selective prosecution.
- Inaction/delay/Refusal/Neglect/ to carry out prosecution of a criminal case after completion of the requisite investigations.
- Police ignore/ neglects/delays to execute DPP's directions to investigate and or other directions that are given in any given criminal matter.
- Requests by an aggrieved complainant to ODPP for an Appeal in case of perceived unjustified Acquittal.
- Request by a complainant to withdraw a criminal case.
- Request by a complainant (and/or their close relatives) and or prosecution witnesses for Witness Protection at the prosecution stage.
- Concern as a result of a decision to waive a prosecution or to abandon a prosecution that had been commenced against a person charged.
- Miscellaneous Criminal applications.
- Interference with witness statements at the prosecution stage.
- Seeking Consent to conduct private investigations.
- Petition to prosecute.
- Dissatisfaction with a judgement or outcome of a criminal trial due to acts and omissions of ODPP.
- A missing/lost prosecution file.
- A citizen dissatisfied with ODPP's response to a criminal case
- A request for ODPP to review its decision on whether to charge or not to charge.
- Charging of an accused with a less serious charge than the actual or charging with a more serious offence than the actual.
- Unresponsiveness, lack of communication on matters of prosecution and or other incidental matters.
- Refusal to release exhibits to a victim of crime thereby perpetuating the suffering of the victim.
- Refusal by ODPP to charge a suspect.
- Mishandling of a prosecution case; the prosecutor interfering with the witness by attempting to coerce the witness to give evidence in a biased manner.
- Withdrawal of a criminal case without justification.
- Prosecution case taking too long to conclude because of an indolent prosecutor.
- Sabotage of the success of a criminal case by the failure by ODPP to call key witnesses.
- Lethargy or lack of goodwill to prosecute.
- Complaint against ODPP's county offices.
- Professional misconduct and unresponsiveness by prosecutors, e.g. rudeness, arrogance and absence from office
- A person masquerading as a prosecutor.
- Corrupt Prosecutors.
- Abuse of prosecutorial powers.
- Abuse of the criminal process by converting a purely civil matter to become a criminal matter (e.g. if police investigations get entangled in a purely civil matter that then results in a prosecution, such a prosecution is an abuse of the criminal law process. N/B: Please note that it is also possible to have both civil and criminal aspects emanating from the same transaction and investigators have every right to recommend charging if they come across evidence of criminal activity in a civil transaction).

The first holder of the Office of Director of Public Prosecutions under the 2010 Constitution was Keriako Tobiko who served from 2011 before resigning in 2018 when he was appointed as the cabinet Secretary for the ministry of environment and natural resources.

== Other jurisdictions ==
In the United Kingdom, the equivalent position to the director of public prosecutions is a chief crown prosecutor, this prosecutors work under the Crown Prosecution Service In England and Wales, District Attorney in the United States and Procurator Fiscal In Scotland

In Canada, The equivalent position to a director of public prosecutor is a crown attorney, crown counsel or Crown Prosecutor depending on the province

== List of Director of Public Prosecutions ==
| # | Name | Took office | Left office | Appointed by |
|---|---|---|---|---|
| 1 | Keriako Tobiko | 2011 | 2018 | Mwai Kibaki |
| 2 | Nurdin` Hajji | 2018 | 2023 | Uhuru Kenyatta |
| 3 | Renson Ingonga | 2023 | Incumbent | William Ruto |
