= Renson Ingonga =

Kenyan advocate

Renson Mulele Ingonga, OGW, CBS
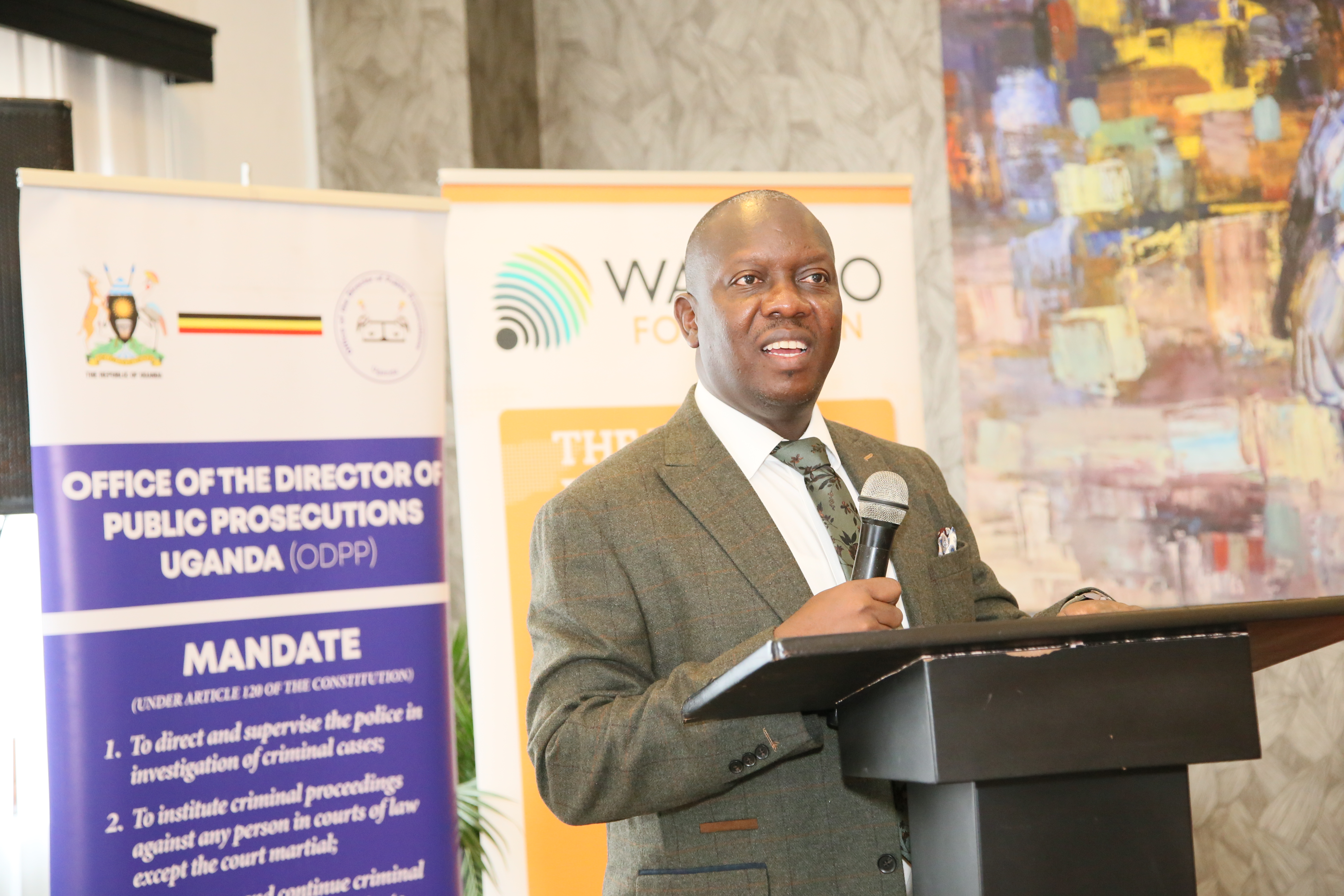
- Renson Mulele Ingonga, Kampala, Nov 2023
- Born: 10 July 1973; Kakamega County
- Citizenship: Kenya
- Education: Moi University (LLB); Kenya School of Law (PGDip); University of Nairobi (LLM)
- Known for: Litigation management, Prosecution process management, Human Rights, Dispute Resolution, Criminal Law
- Title: Director of Public Prosecutions of Kenya
- Predecessor: Noordin Haji

Renson Mulele Ingonga, OGW, CBS, is an advocate of the high court of Kenya, the Director of Public Prosecutions of Kenya, and the President of both the Africa Prosecutors Association (APA), and Eastern Africa Association of Prosecutors (EAPP).

== Career ==
Mr. Ingonga has served in both the private and public sectors for over two decades. After his pupilage in 2004, Ingonga started out as a legal assistant, then as an associate at Shitsama & Co. advocates in Kakamega, Kenya. In April 2006 he joined the Public Service as a Registrar of titles, Ministry of Lands, Mombasa County till the year 2009 before stepping up to the Senior land registration officer role, then the chief land registration officer portfolio, for three years.

He joined the Office of the Director of Public Prosecutions (ODPP) in the year 2014 as a Senior Principal Prosecution Counsel (SPPC) and was subsequently appointed as the Head of ODPP Kajiado County for four years until he was subsequently transferred to Mombasa as Head of the County until the year 2019. Thereafter, he served as the Assistant Director of Public Prosecutions in charge of Kilifi, and Kiambu Counties between 2019 and 2022. Subsequently, he was promoted to the rank of Senior Assistant Director of Public Prosecutions & Regional Coordinator, North-Eastern, ODPP, Garissa.

On 25 September 2023, he was appointed Director of Public Prosecutions of Kenya by HE the President of the Republic of Kenya Dr. William Samoei Ruto following vetting by the Justice and Legal Affairs Committee (JLAC) and approval by the National Assembly.

He is currently the President of the East African Association of Prosecutors (EAAP) and in July 2024 he was elected the President of the Africa Prosecutors' Association (APA) during the Association's 17th annual conference and general meeting held in Marrakech, Morocco.

== Awards ==
In December 2022, he was bestowed with the State Honors of the Order of the Grand Warrior (OGW), and in December 2024, he was conferred with First Class Chief of the Order of the Burning Spear (C.B.S.), both by his Excellency the President of the Republic of Kenya, William Ruto.

In March 2025, he was awarded the runners-up public service CEO at the Digital Transformation Public Sector Awards in Mombasa, Kenya.
