= Public procurement in Kenya =

Public procurement in Kenya is governed by the Public Procurement and Asset Disposal Act 2015, whose full title is "An Act of Parliament to give effect to Article 227 of the Constitution; to provide procedures for efficient public procurement and for assets disposal by public entities; and for connected purposes". This legislation came into effect on 7 January 2016, repealing the previous Public Procurement and Disposal Act of 2005, and all state organs and public entities within Kenya are required to comply with this law in regard to planning and undertaking procurement, inventory management, asset disposal and contract management, except where the provisions of the Public Private Partnership Act, 2013 already apply to procurement and disposal of assets, or where procurement and disposal of assets takes place under bilateral or multilateral agreements between the Government of Kenya and any other foreign government or multilateral agency.

The law provides for the National Treasury to be responsible for public procurement and asset disposal policy formulation.

== History ==
Public procurement in Kenya is a newer market compared to other Western countries. Since Kenya was a colonial entity of the United Kingdom until the middle of the 20th century, there was no Kenyan government to conduct public procurement. In the early days of the country there was no regulation of the public procurement market. Thus, the laws and traditions regarding public procurement are mostly from the 21st century. Until the establishment of the Public Procurement Oversight Authority in 2005, regulation of public procurement in Kenya was largely done by treasury circulars.

Article 227 of the 2010 Constitution of Kenya provided for new standards for public procurement. This article requires public procurement to be set up in a manner that is fair, equitable, transparent, competitive, and cost effective. It also set requirements for the Kenyan parliament to pass procurement regulations that would provide for preferential allotment of contracts and protection for disadvantaged groups. It will also have to pass regulations that would provide for sanctions for non-performing contractors and those found guilty of corruption, tax violations, or labor law violations.

== Government authorities ==
Public procurement in Kenya is overseen by the Public Procurement Oversight Authority (PPOA). The Public Procurement Oversight Authority was established by the Public Procurement and Disposal Act of 2005.

The Public Procurement and Disposal Act of 2005 also established the Public Procurement Advisory Board (PPAB), the continuance of the Public Procurement Complaints, Review and Appeals Board as the Public Procurement Administrative Review Board (PPARB).

== Access to government procurement opportunities ==
The Access to Government Procurement Opportunities (AGPO) law, originally introduced in 2012, set aside 10% of government contracts to be awarded to disadvantaged groups (i.e. enterprises owned by young people, women or persons with a disability) without competition from established firms. This percentage was increased to 30% in 2013. The AGPO policy also covers micro and small enterprises, local and citizen contractors and citizen contractors in joint ventures with foreign suppliers.

== Problems with public procurement in Kenya ==
The Public Procurement Oversight Authority (PPOA) estimated in 2007 that procuring entities in Kenya were paying around 60% more than prevailing market prices. This signals that there is an noncompetitive procurement market in Kenya. It is estimated that 25% of public expenditure can be saved by proper implementation of public procurement laws and regulations in Kenya.

According to a 2007 assessment undertaken using OECD methodology, the legal and regulatory framework set up for public procurement in the last decade has strengthened the system, but weaknesses still exist. There are significant challenges to applying the newly set framework and enforcing the laws. Other issues are the disproportionate reliance on quotations for procurement, as well as significant differences in procurement methods between public entities.

== Chinese influence ==
Public procurement in Kenya has close relations with Chinese investments. The Chinese government has invested heavily in building infrastructure in the region, including providing debt for the Kenyan government to hire Chinese firms to build infrastructure projects. A major example of this is the pipeline connecting Nairobi to Mombasa.

Opposition figures have criticized the use of public funds to award contracts to Chinese firms, as these contractors often bring in workers from China, which reduces job opportunities for native Kenyans.
