= Ukur Yatani Kanacho =

Kenyan politician and ambassador (born 1967)

Ambassador Ukur Yatani Kanacho
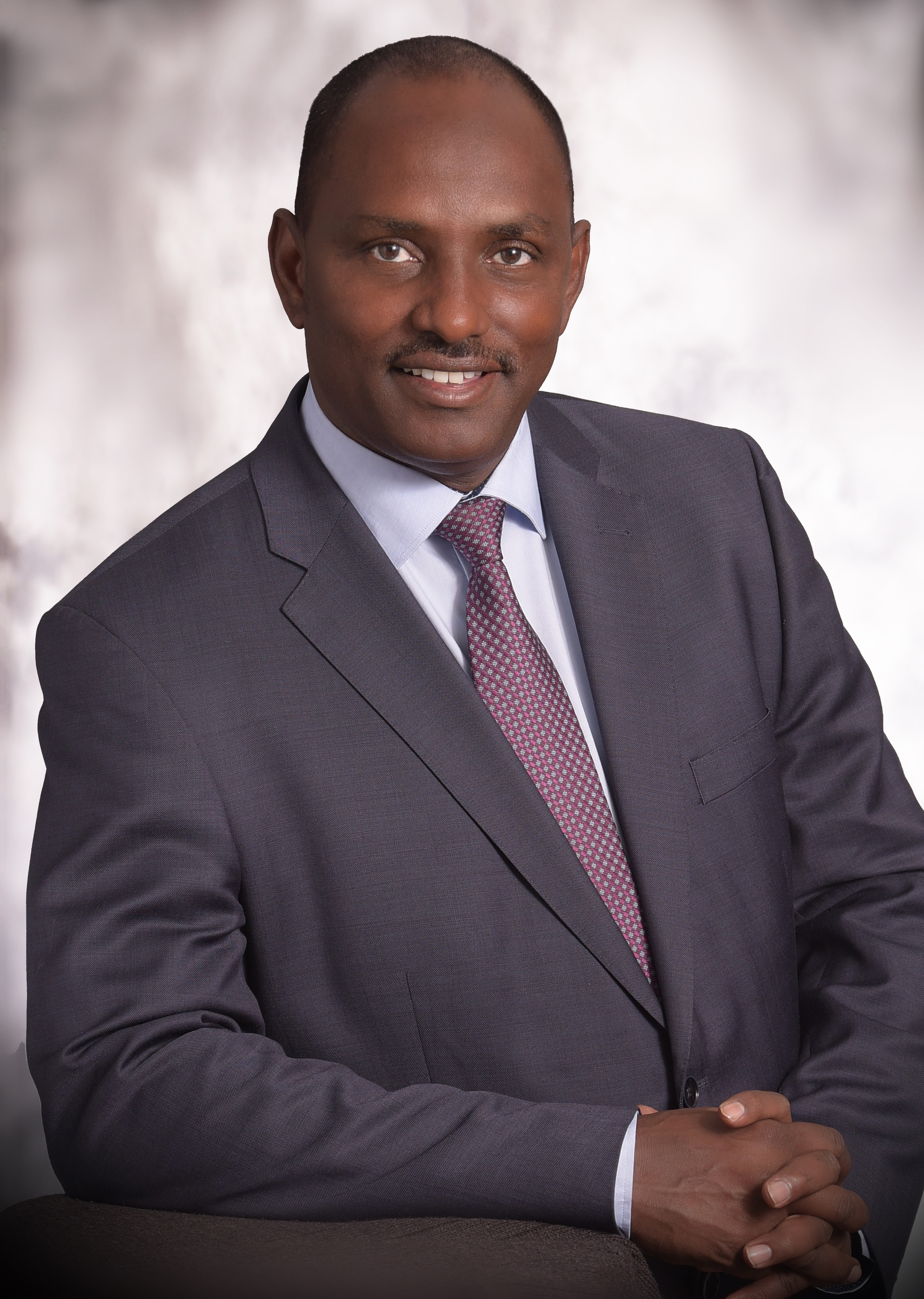

Finance Cabinet Secretary
- In office 2020–2022
- Preceded by: Hon Henry Rotich
- Succeeded by: Njuguna Ndung'u

Labour and Social Protection Cabinet Secretary
- In office 2019–2020
- Preceded by: Phyllis Kandie

Governor of Marsabit County
- In office 2013–2017
- Preceded by: Inaugural officeholder

Permanent Representative to the United Nations, Vienna
- In office 2009–2012

Member of the Kenyan Parliament, North Horr Constituency
- In office 2006–2007
- Constituency: North

Personal details
- Born: Ukur Yatani Kanacho; 12 March 1967 (age 59) Marsabit
- Spouse: Dr. Gumato Yatani
- Education: Egerton University; University of York
- Occupation: Public Servant
- Website: www.ukurkanacho.com

Ukur Yatani Kanacho (born 12 March 1967) is a Kenyan politician and ambassador, and was appointed as Finance Cabinet Secretary on 14 January 2020.

Yatani served as the First Governor of Marsabit County from 2013 to 2017, was the Permanent Representative to the United Nations in Vienna from 2009 to 2012, and served as the Member of Parliament for North Horr Constituency in 2006. In 2019 he served as the Cabinet Secretary for Labour and Social Protection. In 2020 he was named Cabinet Secretary for the National Treasury.

== Early life and education ==
Yatani was born in 1967 in Forole of North Horr sub-county to Yatani Kanacho, a prominent Gabra elder. In 1975, he started school in Maikona, and was then transferred to North Horr Primary school in 1978. Yatani sat for his Certificate of Primary Education (CPE) in 1981 and emerged the top student in the then Marsabit District. He was given a scholarship by the Jomo Kenyatta Foundation and he joined Garbatulla High school. He later joined Kabarnet High school for his A-levels between 1986 and 1987.

Yatani received his Bachelor of Arts in Economics and Sociology from Egerton University in 1991. In 2005, he joined the University of York in the UK and studied for a Master of Public Administration and Public Policy.

== Political life ==
Yatani worked as a District Officer for the Government of Kenya, rising from District Officer Cadet to Senior District Officer, and was promoted to District Commissioner in July 2002. In this position he coordinated state business, managed government resources, maintained law and order, directed disaster relief operations, and implemented long-term strategic plans.

In 2006 Yatani was elected Member of Parliament for North Horr constituency. During his term Marsabit North District was created, and he led the formation of several administrative units across the constituency.

He was then appointed Assistant Minister in the Ministry of Science and Technology. In this role he gave policy direction to the ministry, represented the government in local and international negotiations, and assisted the Minister in carrying out ministerial and government functions.

In 2009 Yatani was appointed Ambassador to Austria and Kenya's Permanent Representative to the United Nations in Vienna. As ambassador to Austria, with accreditation to Hungary and Slovakia, he provided consular services to Kenyans living abroad and promoted trade and economic cooperation with European countries. He also served on the Board of Governors of the International Atomic Energy Agency (IAEA).

Yatani also held senior positions in several diplomatic and international bodies at the United Nations and chaired the African Group of Ambassadors.

In the 2013 Marsabit local elections Yatani was elected the first governor of Marsabit County, the largest county in Kenya by area. As governor he was responsible for setting up the newly created county government.

During his term he oversaw the establishment of devolved governance structures and of the county's financial and human resources systems, set the county's development agenda, and promoted coexistence among its fifteen indigenous ethnic communities.

Yatani oversaw the roll-out of the County Integrated Development Plan, which included the construction of new county offices, a four-storey market, a stadium, more than a dozen health centres, a tourist resort and 200 early childhood development (ECD) classrooms.

His administration upgraded 5,000 kilometres of gravel roads, tarmacked roads in Marsabit town, and drilled and commissioned more than fifty boreholes. It also established two referral hospitals and bought two dozen ambulances. He oversaw the installation of solar street lighting and drainage systems, and his administration invested in agriculture and livestock. He supported cultural festivals, and the Lake Turkana Cultural Festival was nominated for India's Tagore Award.

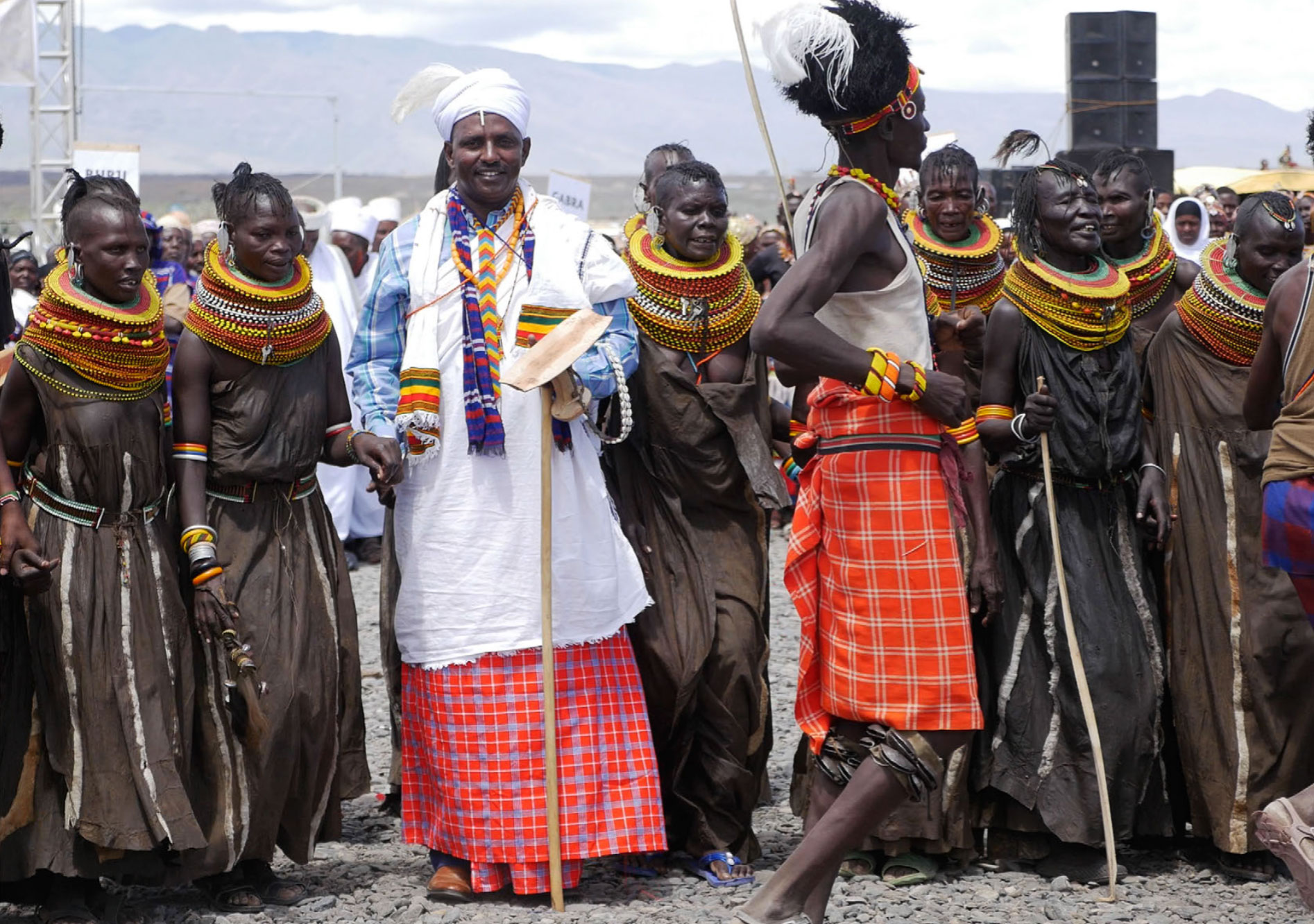
Ukur Yatani Kanacho dancing at the Lake Turkana Cultural Festival

Yatani worked with the national government and investors to bring two new roads to the county, as well as the Lake Turkana Wind Power Station. He also led a UNDP-funded cross-border programme in the region, and obtained funding from the African Development Bank for a livestock quarantine zone, an abattoir and the development of export markets for Marsabit's livestock products.

On 16 February 2018, Yatani was sworn in by the President of the Republic of Kenya, Uhuru Kenyatta, as Cabinet Secretary of the Ministry of Labour and Social Protection.

In July 2019 President Uhuru Kenyatta appointed Yatani acting Cabinet Secretary for the National Treasury following the suspension of Henry Rotich. He was confirmed as Cabinet Secretary on 14 January 2020.

== Other activities ==
- African Development Bank (AfDB), Ex-Officio Member of the Board of Governors (2019–2022)
- East African Development Bank (EADB), Ex-Officio Member of the Governing Council (2019–2022)
- International Monetary Fund (IMF), Ex-Officio Member of the Board of Governors (2019–2022)
- P4G – Partnering for Green Growth and the Global Goals 2030, Member of the Board of Directors (2019–2022)
- World Bank, Ex-Officio Member of the Board of Governors (2019–2022)
- Vice-President of the Board of Governors The African Capacity Building Foundation (ACBF)
