= Henry Rotich =

Former Kenyan treasury CS (born 1969)

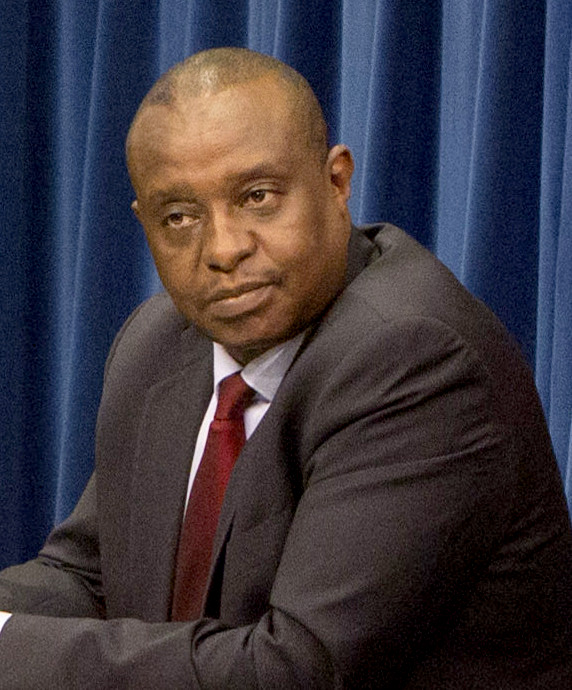

Cabinet Secretary for National Treasury
- In office 15 May 2013 – 14 January 2020
- President: Uhuru Kenyatta
- Preceded by: Robinson Njeru Githae
- Succeeded by: Ukur Yatani

Head of Macroeconomics at the Treasury
- In office March 2006 – 15 May 2013
- President: Mwai Kibaki
- Succeeded by: Dennis ndirangu
- President: William Ruto
- Succeeded by: Dennis ndirangu

Personal details
- Born: c. 1969 (age 56–57)
- Children: 2
- Education: University of Nairobi (BA), (MA); Harvard Kennedy School (MPA)

Henry K. Rotich (born 1969) is a Kenyan civil servant who served as Cabinet Secretary for the National Treasury following his appointment by Uhuru Kenyatta on 23 April 2013. On 14 January 2020, Rotich, who had been arrested on charges of corruption, was removed from this position.

== Education ==
Rotich holds a master's degree in public administration (MPA) from the Harvard Kennedy School, Harvard University, US. He holds a master's degree in economics and a Bachelor of Arts degree in economics and sociology, both from University of Nairobi, Kenya.

== Career ==
Before being promoted to cabinet, Rotich served as head of macroeconomics at the Treasury from 2006. He was credited with crafting key policy frameworks over the following years, the under the leadership of minister Robinson Njeru Githae.

Rotich served as minister of finance during Kenyatta's first term in office. During his first term, he launched the world's first Treasury bond to be offered exclusively via mobile phone and slashed the minimum investment level in government debt, in a bid to stimulate public participation in the capital markets, raise money cheaply and boost the national savings rate. Also under his leadership, Kenya secured a $1.5 billion loan from the International Monetary Fund (IMF) in 2016, one of the biggest the IMF had granted on the continent up to that point. Under a restructuring deal overseen by Rotich in 2017, the Kenyan government took over 48.9 per cent of Kenya Airways after it had suffered five years of losses, including a Ksh26.2bn loss in 2015/2016, the biggest in Kenyan corporate history.

Rotich was retained in his position after the 2017 elections. For the 2018 fiscal year, he cut the government's spending budget by 55.1 billion shillings ($546.90 million), or 1.8 percent. Shortly after, he unveiled a package of initiatives to develop Islamic finance in the country, as part of efforts to mobilize local funds and set Nairobi as a regional hub for the sector. He also announced plans to introduce a set of reforms for the financial sector aimed at boosting private sector credit growth after it was hit by a cap on commercial interest rates introduced in 2016.

== Corruption allegations, arrest and removal from government ==
In August 2018, a joint report by two parliamentary committees submitted to the Parliament of Kenya called for Rotich and fellow cabinet member Adan Mohammed to be investigated over the way they handled sugar imports. On 22 July 2019, Kenya's director of public prosecutions (DPP) Noordin Haji ordered the arrest and prosecution of Rotich and others over allegations of corruption related to the construction of two dams, Arror and Kimwarer. Among the others charged are Paolo Porcelli, the Italian director of CMC di Ravenna; and Rotich's number two at the ministry, Kamau Thugge, the principal secretary. Shortly after, President Kenyatta appointed Labour Minister Ukur Yatani Kanacho as acting finance minister, and Yatani would permanently replace Rotich on 14 January 2020. Rotich is the first sitting Kenyan Minister to be arrested for corruption.

== Other activities ==
=== International organizations ===
- African Development Bank (AfDB), ex-officio member of the board of governors (since 2013)
- East African Development Bank (EADB), ex-officio member of the Governing Council (since 2013)
- International Monetary Fund (IMF), ex-officio member of the board of governors
- Multilateral Investment Guarantee Agency (MIGA), World Bank Group, ex-officio member of the board of governors (since 2013)
- World Bank, ex-officio member of the board of governors (since 2013)

In 2024 Rotich was appointed by the Public Service Commission to serve as the senior advisor on fiscal affairs and budget policy in office of president Ruto.
