= Mohamed Yusuf Haji =

Kenyan politician

Mohamed Yusuf Haji EGH
- Maxamed Yuusuf Xaaji
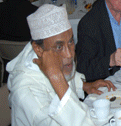

Member of the Kenyan Senate
- In office 28 March 2013 – 15 February 2021
- Succeeded by: Abdulkadir Haji
- Constituency: Garissa County

Minister of State for Defence
- In office 8 January 2008 – 26 April 2013
- President: Mwai Kibaki
- Preceded by: Njenga Karume
- Succeeded by: Raychelle Omamo

Acting Minister of State for Internal Security and Provincial Administration
- In office 10 June 2012 – 20 September 2012
- President: Mwai Kibaki
- Prime Minister: Raila Odinga
- Preceded by: George Saitoti
- Succeeded by: Katoo Ole Metito

Member of the National Assembly of Kenya
- In office 2003 – March 2013
- Preceded by: Mohammed Weyrah
- Succeeded by: Ibrahim Abass Ibrahim
- Constituency: Ijara

Personal details
- Born: 23 December 1940 Garissa District, British Kenya
- Died: 15 February 2021 (aged 80) Nairobi, Kenya
- Party: KANU; TNA
- Children: Noordin Haji (son); Abdul Haji (son)
- Education: University of Birmingham (Dip)
- Ethnicity: Somali
- Religion: Islam

Mohamed Yusuf Haji (Somali: Maxamed Yuusuf Xaaji) (23 December 1940 – 15 February 2021) was a Kenyan politician. He was the Minister of State for Defence of Kenya from 2008 to 2013, and briefly served as its acting Minister of Internal Security and Provincial Affairs in 2012. He served in the Senate of Kenya since 2013 under the jubilee party. He died on 15 February 2021.

== Personal life ==
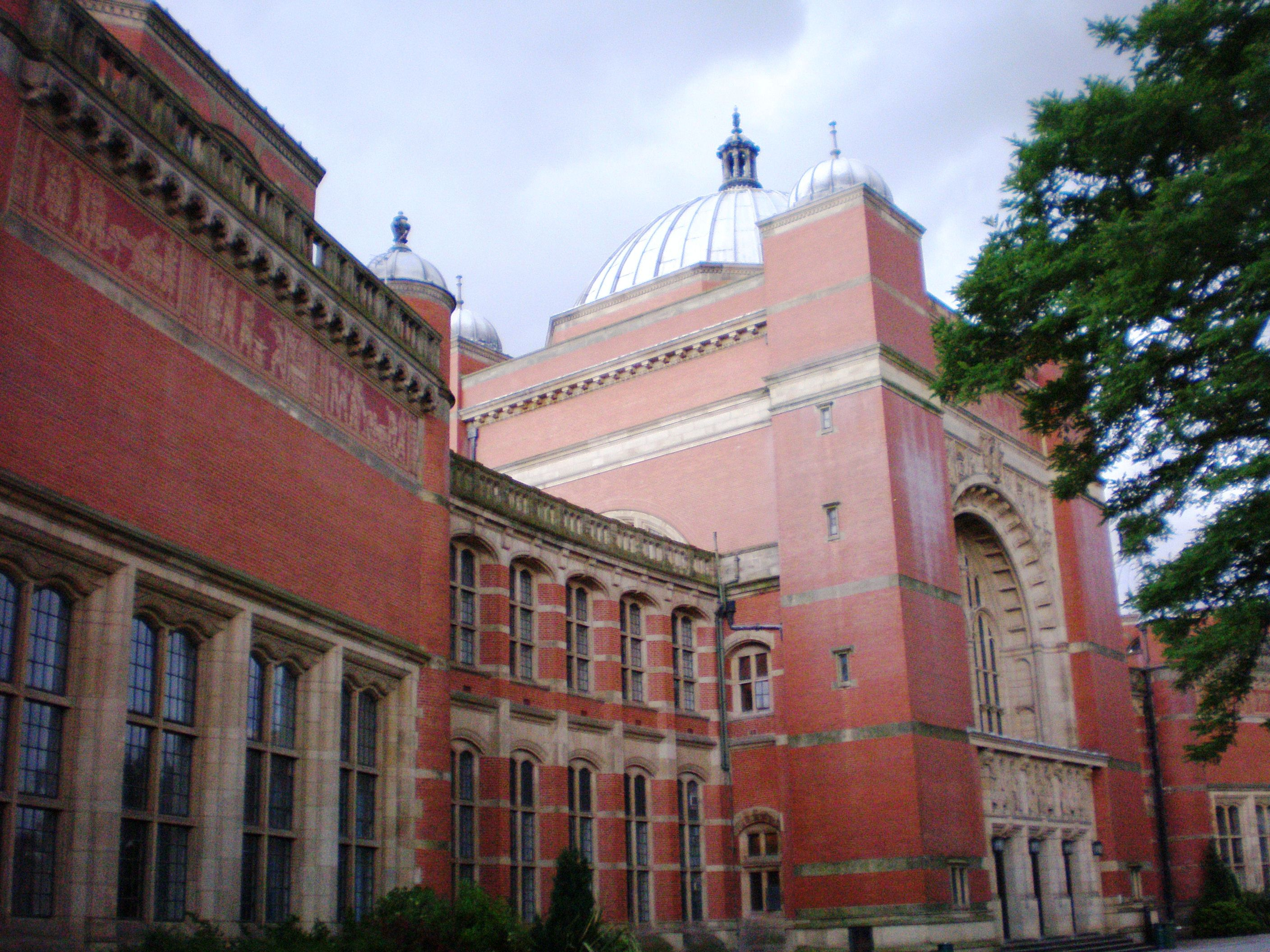
Birmingham University

Haji was born on 23 December 1940 in Garissa District in the North Eastern Province (Northern Frontier District) to an ethnic Somali family. He hails from the Abdalla subclan of the Ogaden and Majeerteen from his mom side.

For his post-secondary education, Haji earned a diploma from the University of Birmingham, where he majored in Management and Finance Control.

Haji is married and has nine children (one deceased). One of Haji's son, Abdul Yusuf Haji, is a businessman. Another son, Noordin Yusuf Haji, is an undercover anti-terrorism agent and the Director of Public Prosecutions, He also worked as a deputy director of the National Intelligence Service and worked in the attorney general's office since 1999. Both of Haji's sons, Abdul and Noordin (who both of them have experience with guns since their childhood), were involved in the Westgate shopping mall attack in 2013 and they were credited with saving multiple lives despite deadly danger. Abdul was photographed helping rescue an American mother and her three daughters, providing cover with other armed rescuers by Goran Tomasevic, Reuters chief photographer for East Africa. The senator died in 2021 on the morning of 15 February and after a very long time illnesses that saw him flown to Turkey for treatment and came back to the country where he died a week later at the Agha Khan hospital.

== Political career ==
=== Early career ===
Haji began his professional career in administration and management. He joined the Provincial Administration of Kenya as a District Officer in 1960, and went on to serve as Provincial Commissioner between 1970 and 1997. He was among the eight powerful provincial commissioners who were in office during the Wagalla Massacre in February 1984.

In 1998, Haji was nominated as a member of the Kenyan Parliament. He was later elected an official Member of Parliament on a Kenya African National Union (KANU) ticket.

From 1998 to 2001, Haji worked as an Assistant Minister in the Office of the President. He subsequently acted as the Office's Minister of State for Cabinet Affairs in 2002.

On a KANU ticket, Haji was elected to represent the Ijara Constituency in the National Assembly of Kenya at the 2007 parliamentary elections.

=== Minister of Defence ===
On 8 January 2008, Haji was appointed Kenya's Minister of State for Defence after the 27 December 2007 general elections.

On 18 October 2011, Haji and a Kenyan delegation met with Transitional Federal Government of Somalia (TFG) officials in Mogadishu to discuss security issues cooperation against the Islamist Al-Shabaab group as part of the coordinated Operation Linda Nchi. Haji and Somalia's Minister of Defence Hussein Arab Isse then signed an agreement to collaborate against the insurgent group.

In early June 2012, Haji signed another agreement officially re-hatting Kenya's deployed military forces in Somalia under the AMISOM general command.

Haji's term as Minister of Defence ended on 26 April 2013.

=== Minister of Internal Security ===
On 18 June 2012, Haji was appointed Kenya's acting Minister of Internal Security and Provincial Affairs after the incumbent minister George Saitoti died in a helicopter crash a few days earlier. Haji had previously worked closely with Saitoti on the Linda Nchi military operation. Haji held the new position concurrently with the Minister of Defence docket until a permanent Internal Minister was appointed on 21 September 2012.
