= Simon Chelugui =

Kenyan politician

Simon Kiprono Chelugui is a Kenyan politician born in Kisanana, Mogotio, Baringo County. He is a former Cabinet Secretary for Cooperatives and Micro and Small Enterprise having been appointed by President William Ruto and sworn into office on 27 October 2022. He served until 11 July 2024.

He was previously Cabinet Secretary for Labour and Social Protection. He had also served as Cabinet Secretary for Water, Sanitation & Irrigation during the Presidency of Uhuru Kenyatta. As of September 2022, Simon Chelugui is the only minister who served under former President Uhuru Kenyatta to have been extended by new Head of State William Ruto.

== See also ==
- Politics of Kenya
