= 2013 Marsabit local elections =

Local elections in Kenya

Local elections were held in Marsabit County to elect a Governor and County Assembly on 4 March 2013. Under the new constitution, which was passed in a 2010 referendum, the 2013 general elections were the first in which Governors and members of the County Assemblies for the newly created counties were elected.

== Gubernatorial election ==
Candidate	Running Mate	Coalition	Party	Votes
Ali, Mohamud Mohamed	Sarbo, Hassan Marsa		United Republican Party	--
Kanacho, Ukur Yatani	Ali, Omar Abdi	Cord	Orange Democratic Movement	--
Tadicha, Abdalla Chachu	Khalif, Abdikadir Ibrahim		Kenya African National Union	--

== Prospective candidates ==
The following are some of the candidates who have made public their intentions to run:

- Chachu Tadicha - Ethiopia Save the Children Country Director
- Mohamud Ali - Moyale MP
