= Keriako Tobiko =

Kenyan Cabinet Secretary for Environment

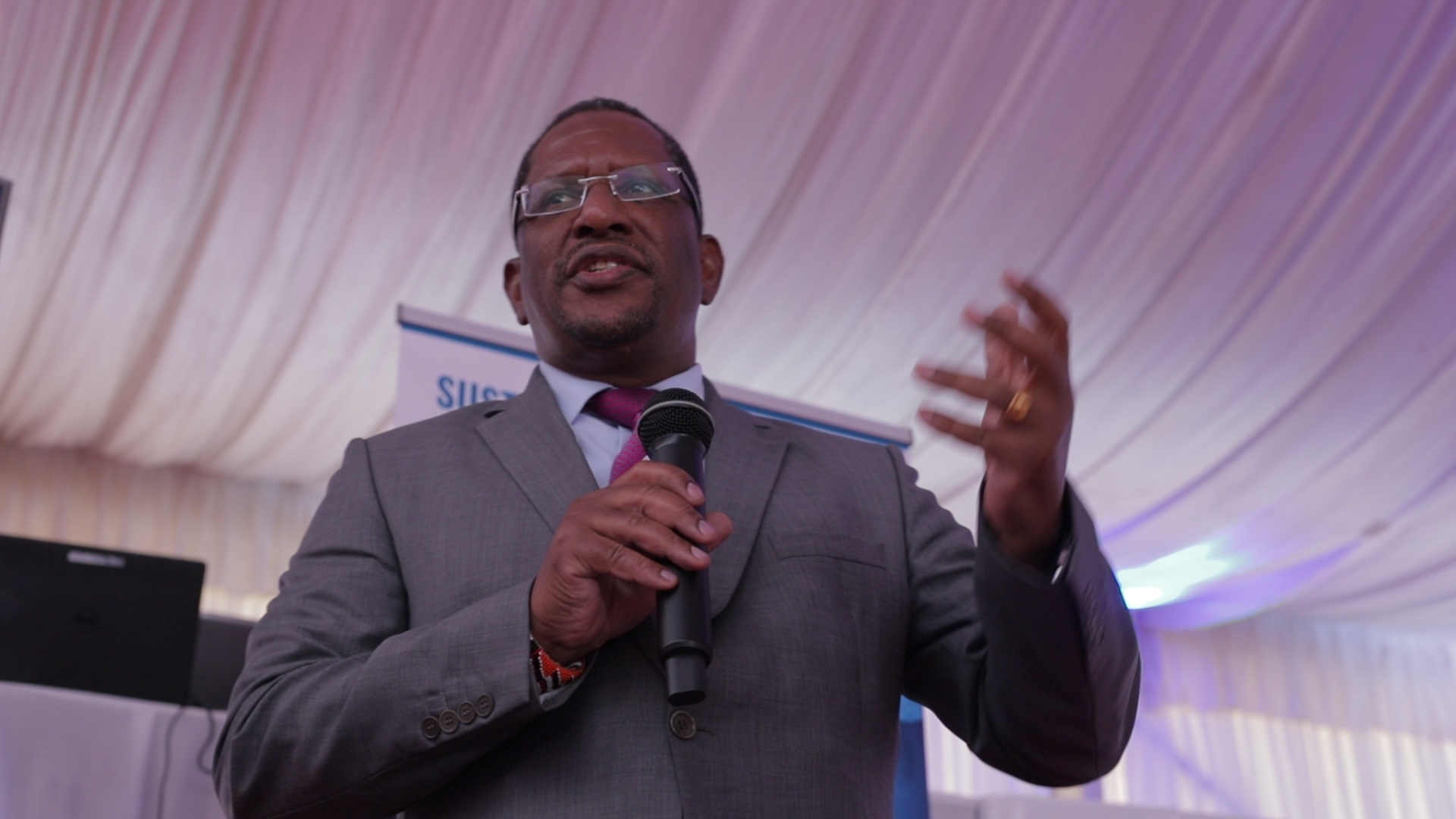
- Keriako Tobiko during a conference in 2019

Cabinet Secretary for the Ministry of Environment and Forestry
- In office 2018–2022

Director of Public Prosecutions of Kenya
- In office 2011–2018

Personal details
- Occupation: lawyer

Keriako Tobiko is a former Kenyan Cabinet Secretary for Environment. As a lawyer by profession, he previously served as the Director of Public Prosecutions of Kenya. He also previously served as a commissioner on the Constitution of Kenya Review Commission, where his differences with its then chair Yash Pal Ghai would later come back to haunt him, as Ghai made presentations against his confirmation as DPP over alleged involvement in a land grabbing cover up. Ghai also alleged that Tobiko's initial appointment to the office of Director of Public Prosecution was politically motivated.

== Career ==
Before his appointment to the cabinet, Mr Tobiko was the Director of Public Prosecutions, the first holder of the office under the Constitution of Kenya 2010 having been first appointed in 2005. He was re-designated as the Chief Public Prosecutor in August 2010 and appointed to head the independent constitutional office in June 2011.

He is an advocate of the High Court of Kenya and formerly a lecturer at the University of Nairobi. Mr. Tobiko is also an alumnus of the University of Nairobi

== See also ==
- Director of Public Prosecutions of Kenya
