= Noordin Haji =

Kenya law officer (born 1973)

Noordin Hajji OGW, CBS
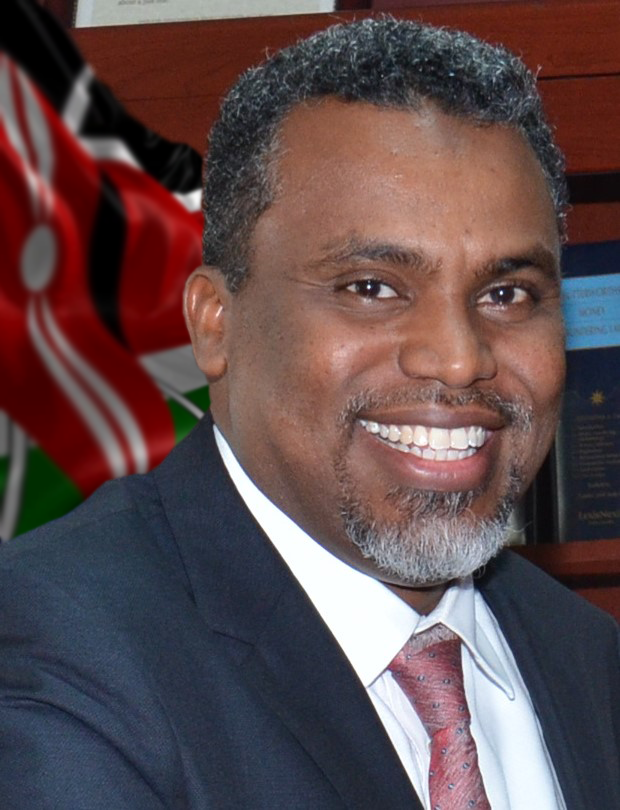

Director General National Intelligence Service
- Incumbent
- Assumed office 14 June 2023
- Preceded by: Philip Kameru

Personal details
- Born: 3 July 1973 (age 53) Malindi, Kenya

Noordin Mohamed Haji (born 3 July 1973) is a Kenyan lawyer and civil servant who is the current Director-General of the National Intelligence Service (NIS). He previously served as the Director of Public Prosecutions from 2018 to 2023.

Haji was born in Malindi. His father was Mohamed Yusuf Haji, a Kenyan politician who served in various roles in the government. Owing to his father's career which occasioned frequent travel around the country, Haji was educated in various primary and secondary schools in the country. He received Bachelor of Laws and Master of Laws degrees from the University of Wales. He was admitted to the bar as an Advocate of the High Court of Kenya in 1999, and joined the State Law Office as state counsel in 2000. He soon thereafter joined the National Intelligence Service, where he served in various capacities until becoming the Deputy Director in charge of the Counter-Organised Crime Unit just prior to his departure from the Service.

On 28 March 2018, Haji was appointed the Director of Public Prosecutions by then President Uhuru Kenyatta. His early tenure was praised, and he won several awards such as Jurist of the Year from the Kenyan Section of the International Commission of Jurists and the Leadership Integrity Award from Transparency International. However, the withdrawal of high-profile corruption cases against various politicians in the closing period of his tenure was sharply criticised and resulted in the withdrawal of the award from Transparency International.

In May 2023, President William Ruto nominated Haji to be the next Director General of the National Intelligence Service. After approval by the National Assembly, he was sworn in on 14 June 2023.

== Early life ==
Haji was born on 3 July 1973 in Malindi, then part of Kilifi District in the Coast Province. His father, Mohamed Yusuf Haji, was a Kenyan politician who held various positions in government throughout his life, including as both a nominated and elected member of parliament, a provincial administrator, senator and the Minister of State for Defence under Mwai Kibaki. His mother was a high school teacher.

== Career ==
=== Director of Public Prosecutions ===
Haji was appointed by H.E Uhuru Kenyatta, the President of the Republic of Kenya as the Director of Public Prosecutions (DPP) on 28 March 2018 following an interview by the Public Service Commission (PSC) and vetting by the National Assembly. During his vetting speech, he would come to outline his strategic focus of Re-casting, Re-tooling and Re-learning for the ODPP. The aim of this strategy is to inject accountability, transparency, public confidence and quality control at the ODPP, ensuring an Office that is more responsive to its citizen's needs. This has been done in conjunction with the expansion of the ODPP to all the 47 counties in Kenya and a restructuring of the organisational structure.

Haji has made charges against Finance Minister Henry Rotich, Migori Governor Okoth Obado, corruption charges against National Youth Service directors and the banks involved, the Kenya Power Directors and Kenya pipeline employees, among others.

One of the most impactful rulings that have been passed during Haji's tenure, is the ruling by the High Court on 25 July 2019 in the case of Samburu Governor Moses Lenolkulal. The ruling stated that governors facing graft charges should step aside from their office and roles during the duration of the case. Furthermore, Section 62(6) of the Anti-Corruption and Economic Crimes Act which governors used to hang onto Office was declared unconstitutional.

Another impactful ruling was the ruling against Sirisia MP John Waluke in June 2020. Waluke was fined ksh. 727 million shillings or in default would face a 67-year jail term for the embezzling of Ksh. 300 million public funds through a maize scandal.

== Honours and awards ==
On 12 December 2012, during the 49th Jamhuri Day celebrations, Haji received the Order of the Grand Warrior of Kenya (OGW) by the then President of the Republic of Kenya, Mwai Kibaki for distinguished services to the nation. Later on, on 12 December 2018, he also received the Chief of the Order of the Burning Spear (CBS) by H.E Uhuru Kenyatta, the President of the Republic of Kenya for his distinguished efforts in the fight against graft.

In recognition of Haji's role as the DPP, he has received numerous awards which include the 2019 Leadership Integrity Award given to him by the Action for Transparency, the Kenyan subsidiary of Transparency International, 2019 Star Person of the Year Award by the Star, and the 2019 Distinguished Taxpayers Award by H.E President Uhuru Kenyatta, among others.

== Controversy ==
In 2023 there has been a growing public concern over the withdrawal of high profile cases by the DPP touching on politicians aligned to President William Ruto. This has seen Haji stripped of an integrity award issued to him in 2019 by Transparency International Kenya.
