= List of finance ministers of Kenya =

Cabinet position in Kenyan Government

The minister of finance of Kenya is a cabinet position held by the minister responsible for the Ministry of Finance.

== List ==
=== Ministers ===
The following are the finance ministers of Kenya since independence.

Parties

Kenya African National Union Party of National Unity

#	Portrait	Minister	Took office	Left office	Notes
1		James Gichuru	1963	1969	
2		Mwai Kibaki	1969	1982	Kenya's longest serving minister. Became third president after being elected overwhelmingly in December 2002.
3		Arthur Magugu	1982	1986	
4		George Saitoti	1986	1992	Goldenberg scandal occurred
5		Musalia Mudavadi	1993	1997	Land economist and son of long serving minister Moses Substone Mudavadi mopped up the excess liquidity related to the 1992 multiparty elections
6		Simeon Nyachae	1998	1999	
7		Francis Masakhalia	February 1999	August 1999	
8		Chris Okemo	September 1999	November 2001	Now facing an extradition case related to money laundering at Kenya Power in his earlier career as Energy minister
9		Christopher Obure	November 2001	December 2002	
10		Daudi Mwiraria	January 2003	February 2006	Resigned following the Anglo-Leasing scandal
11		Amos Kimunya	February 2006	2008	Resigned following the Grand Regency Scandal
–		John Michuki (in a temporary capacity)	2008	2009	
12		Uhuru Kenyatta	2009	2011	Resigned after being charged in the International Criminal Court. Was elected fourth president of Kenya in 2013
13		Robinson Njeru Githae	2011	2013	

=== Cabinet secretaries ===
#	Portrait	Minister	Took office	Left office
1		Henry Rotich	15 May 2013	Removed in office, face charges of corruption; 22 July 2019
2	Ukur Yatani image	Ukur Yatani Kanacho	14 January 2020	2022
3		Njuguna Ndung'u	October 2022	June 2024
4		John Mbadi	July 2024	Present

== See also ==
- Ministry of Foreign Affairs (Kenya)
