= Ministry of Finance (Kenya) =

Government ministry of Kenya

The National Treasury of the Republic of Kenya is the Kenyan government ministry which formulates financial and economic policies and oversees effective coordination of Government financial operations.

Kenyan law provides for the Ministry of Finance to be responsible for public procurement and asset disposal policy formulation.

== See also ==
- Kenya
- Minister for Finance (Kenya)
