= Uhuru Kenyatta =

President of Kenya from 2013 to 2022

His Excellency Uhuru Muigai Kenyatta CGH
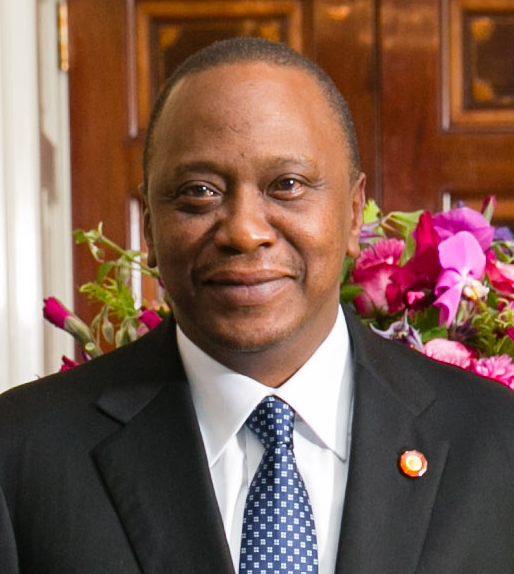
- Kenyatta in 2014

4th President of Kenya
- In office 9 April 2013 – 13 September 2022
- Deputy: William Ruto
- Preceded by: Mwai Kibaki
- Succeeded by: William Ruto

Deputy Prime Minister of Kenya
- In office 13 April 2008 – 9 April 2013 Serving with Musalia Mudavadi
- President: Mwai Kibaki

Minister of Finance
- In office 23 January 2009 – 26 January 2012
- Prime Minister: Raila Odinga
- Preceded by: John Michuki
- Succeeded by: Robinson Michael Githae

Minister of Trade
- In office 13 April 2008 – 23 January 2009
- Prime Minister: Raila Odinga
- Preceded by: Mukhisa Kituyi
- Succeeded by: Amos Kimunya

Minister of Local Government
- In office 8 January 2008 – 13 April 2008
- President: Mwai Kibaki
- Preceded by: Musikari Kombo
- Succeeded by: Musalia Mudavadi

Leader of the Opposition
- In office 1 January 2003 – 30 December 2007
- Preceded by: Mwai Kibaki

Member of Parliament for Gatundu South
- In office 9 January 2003 – 28 March 2013
- Preceded by: Moses Mwihia
- Succeeded by: Jossy Ngugi

Personal details
- Born: Uhuru Muigai Kenyatta; 26 October 1961 (age 64) Nairobi, Kenya Colony
- Party: Kenya African National Union (Before 2012); The National Alliance (2012–2016); Jubilee (2016–present)
- Other political affiliations: Jubilee Alliance (2013–2016)
- Spouse: Margaret Gakuo (m. 1991)
- Children: Jomo Kenyatta, Ngina Kenyatta, Jaba Kenyatta
- Parents: Jomo Kenyatta (father); Ngina Kenyatta (mother)
- Education: Amherst College (BA)
- Website: https://uhurukenyata.com (archived)

Uhuru Mũigai Kenyatta CGH (/ʊ.huː.ruː kɛn.jɑː.tɑː/ born 26 October 1961) is a Kenyan politician who served as the fourth president of Kenya from 2013 to 2022. The son of Jomo Kenyatta, Kenya's first president, he had previously served as Deputy Prime Minister from 2008 to 2013 and as the leader of official opposition from 2003 to 2007.

Daniel Arap Moi had picked Kenyatta as his preferred successor. However, he was defeated by the then opposition leader Mwai Kibaki in the 2002 election, and Kibaki was subsequently sworn in as the President. Kenyatta served as the member of parliament (MP) for Gatundu South from 2002 to 2013 and also as Deputy Prime Minister to Raila Odinga from 2008 to 2013. Currently he is a member and the party leader of the Jubilee Party of Kenya, whose popularity has since dwindled. Kenyatta was previously a member of the Kenya Africa National Union (KANU), a political party that had led Kenya to independence in 1963. He resigned from KANU in 2012 and joined The National Alliance (TNA), one of the allied parties that campaigned for his election victory during the 2013 election. He later on went to form a merger with the United Republican Party (URP) led by William Ruto to form the Jubilee Party.

Kenyatta was re-elected for a second and final term in the August 2017 general elections, winning 54% of the popular vote. The win was formally declared on national television by the Chairperson of the Independent Electoral and Boundaries Commission (IEBC), Wafula Chebukati. However, Uhuru's election was challenged in the Supreme Court of Kenya by his main competitor, Raila Odinga. On 1 September 2017, the court declared the election invalid and ordered a new presidential election to take place within 60 days from the day of the ruling. A new presidential election was held on 26 October, which he won, with 39.03% electoral voter participation.

In October 2021, Kenyatta and six of his family members including his mother, Mama Ngina, and brother, Muhoho—were named in the Pandora Papers leak as beneficiaries of a secretive network of offshore companies and foundations. The documents revealed that the family held assets valued at over $30 million in tax havens such as Panama and the British Virgin Islands, including a secret investment portfolio and real estate. These revelations drew significant criticism, as the use of offshore entities to shield wealth directly contradicted Kenyatta's public "war on corruption" and his administration's mandate for financial transparency and lifestyle audits for Kenyan state officers.

== Early life ==
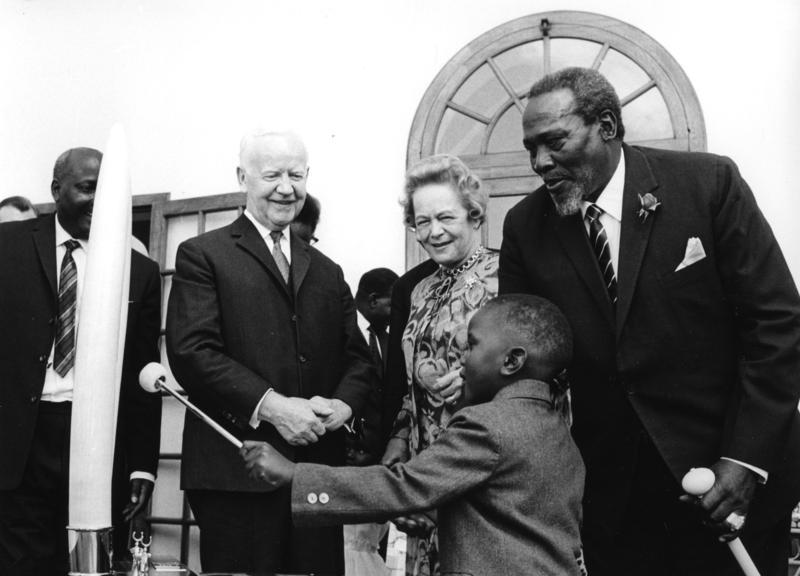
Uhuru with his father and the West German President Heinrich Lübke

Uhuru Kenyatta was born on 26 October 1961, to the first president of Kenya, Jomo Kenyatta, and his fourth wife, Mama Ngina Kenyatta (née Muhoho). The second born in the family, he has two sisters, Christine (born 1953), Anna Nyokabi (born 1963) and a brother, Muhoho Kenyatta (born 1965).

His family hails from the Kikuyu, a Bantu ethnic group. His given name "Uhuru" is from the Swahili term for "freedom" and was given to him in anticipation of Kenya's upcoming independence. Uhuru attended St Mary's School in Nairobi. Between 1979 and 1980, he also briefly worked as a teller at the Kenya Commercial Bank.

After attending St. Mary's school, Uhuru went on to study economics, political science and government at Amherst College in the United States. Upon his graduation, Uhuru returned to Kenya, and started a company, Wilham Kenya Limited, through which he sourced and exported agricultural produce.

Uhuru was nominated to Parliament in 1999, he then became the Minister for Local Government under President Daniel Arap Moi and, despite his political inexperience, was favoured by Moi as his successor. Kenyatta ran as KANU's candidate in the December 2002 presidential election, but lost to the opposition candidate Mwai Kibaki by a big margin. He subsequently became Leader of the Opposition in Parliament. He backed Hon. Mwai Kibaki for re-election in the December 2007 presidential election and was named Minister of Local Government by Former President Mwai Kibaki in January 2008, before being appointed as the Deputy Prime Minister and Minister of Trade in April 2008 as part of the new coalition government.

Subsequently, Uhuru Kenyatta was Minister of Finance from 2009 to 2012, while remaining Deputy Prime Minister. Accused by the International Criminal Court (ICC) of committing crimes against humanity in relation to the violent aftermath of the 2007 election, he resigned as Minister of Finance on 26 January 2012. He was elected as President of Kenya in the March 2013 presidential election, defeating Raila Odinga with a slim majority in a single round of voting.

== Political life ==
In the 1997 general election, Uhuru Kenyatta contested for the Gatundu South Constituency parliamentary seat, once held by his father, but lost to Moses Mwihia, a Nairobi architect.

In 1999, Moi appointed Uhuru to chair the Kenya Tourism Board, a government parastatal. In 2001, he was nominated as a Member of Parliament, and joined the Cabinet as Minister for Local Government. He would also later be elected First Vice Chairman of KANU.

In the 2002 nomination process, which was widely thought as undemocratic and underhand, Moi influenced Uhuru Kenyatta's nomination as KANU's preferred presidential candidate, sparking an outcry from other interested contenders and a massive exit from the party ensued. This move by the late President Moi was seen as a ploy to install Uhuru as a puppet so that even in retirement, Moi would still rule the country through Uhuru and presumably insulate himself against the numerous charges of abuse of office that plagued his presidency.

Uhuru finished second to Mwai Kibaki in the General Elections, with 31% of the vote. He conceded defeat and took up an active leadership role as Leader of the Opposition.

In January 2005, Uhuru Kenyatta defeated Nicholas Biwott for chairmanship of KANU, taking 2,980 votes among party delegates against Biwott's 622 votes.

Uhuru led his party KANU in the referendum campaigns against the draft constitution in 2005, having teamed up with the Liberal Democratic Party, a rebel faction in the Kibaki government, to form the Orange Democratic Movement. The result of this was a vote against the adoption of the draft constitution by a noticeable margin, which was a great political embarrassment to Emilio Mwai Kibaki.

In November 2006, Kenyatta was displaced as KANU leader by the late Nicholas Biwott. On 28 December 2006, the High Court of Kenya reinstated Uhuru Kenyatta as KANU chairman. However, further court proceedings followed. On 28 June 2007, the High Court confirmed Kenyatta as party leader, ruling that there was insufficient evidence for Biwott's argument that Kenyatta had joined another party.

In the run up to the 2007 general election, he led KANU to join a coalition (called Party of National Unity "PNU") with President Mwai Kibaki who was running for a second term against Raila Odinga. PNU won the controversial 2007 elections but the dispute over the poll resulted in the 2007–08 Kenyan crisis.

Under an agreement between the two parties to end the chaos, Kibaki remained as president in a power sharing agreement with Raila as Prime Minister, while Uhuru Kenyatta was Kibaki's choice as Deputy Prime Minister and Minister For Finance in his share of Cabinet slots.

On 13 September 2007, Uhuru Kenyatta withdrew from the December 2007 presidential election in favour of Kibaki for re-election. He said that he did not want to run unless he could be sure of winning.

Following the election, amidst the controversy that resulted when Kibaki was declared the victor despite claims of fraud from challenger Raila Odinga and his Orange Democratic Movement, Kibaki appointed Kenyatta as Minister for Local Government on 8 January 2008.

After Kibaki and Odinga reached a power-sharing agreement, Kenyatta was named Deputy Prime Minister and Minister of Trade on 13 April 2008, as part of the Grand Coalition Cabinet. He was the Deputy Prime Minister representing the PNU, while another Deputy Prime Minister, Musalia Mudavadi, represented the ODM.

Kenyatta and the rest of the Cabinet were sworn in on 17 April. Uhuru Kenyatta was later moved from Local Government and appointed Minister for Finance on 23 January 2009. During his tenure, he spearheaded a number of reform measures that changed how treasury and government by extension transact business, such as the Integrated Financial Management Information System (IFMIS) and a fund for the inclusion of the informal sector in the mainstream economy.

In 2013, Uhuru Kenyatta was elected as the 4th President of Kenya under The National Alliance (TNA), which was part of the Jubilee Alliance with his running mate William Ruto's United Republican Party (URP). Uhuru and Ruto won 50.07% of votes cast, with closest rivals, Raila Odinga and running mate Kalonzo Musyoka of the Coalition for Reforms and Democracy garnering 42%.

Raila Amolo Odinga disputed the election results at the Supreme Court which however held (7–0) that the election of Uhuru was valid and such irregularities as existed did not make a difference to the final outcome. Uhuru Kenyatta was therefore sworn in as president on 9 April 2013.

Uhuru ran for president in the elections held on 4 March 2013 and garnered 6,173,433 votes (50.03%) out of the 12,338,667 votes cast. As this was above the 50% plus 1 vote threshold, he won the election in the first round thus evading a run-off between the top two candidates. He was, therefore, declared the fourth President of the Republic of Kenya by the Independent Electoral and Boundaries Commission (IEBC).

According to the IEBC, Raila Odinga garnered 5,340,546 votes (43.4%) and was thus the second in the field of eight candidates. CORD, under the leadership of presidential candidate Raila Odinga, lodged a petition with the Supreme Court of Kenya on 10 March 2013 challenging Uhuru's election.

On 30 March 2013, Dr Willy Mutunga, the Chief Justice of Kenya, read the unanimous Supreme Court ruling declaring the election of Uhuru Kenyatta and his running-mate, William Ruto, as valid. On 11 August 2017, the Chairman of the IEBC, Wafula Chebukati announced Uhuru's reelection to a second term in office during the 2017 Kenyan general election, with 54% of the popular vote. This was later contested in court and annulled. Innulment, a second election was required in which Uhuru Kenyatta won with 98% of the vote with a 39% voter turnout.

On 9 March 2018 Uhuru Kenyatta agreed on a truce between the opposition leader, Raila Odinga. This action marked the country's watershed moment that redrew its political architecture. On 27 November 2019, Uhuru Kenyatta launched the Building Bridges Initiatives (BBI) in Bomas of Kenya. This is one of the outcomes as a result of the truce with the opposition leader Raila Odinga as its implementations will foresee some amendments in the Kenyan Constitution.

=== International Criminal Court Charges ===
Prior to him becoming president, Kenyatta was named as a suspect of crimes against humanity by the International Criminal Court (ICC) prosecutor Luis Moreno Ocampo, for planning and funding violence in Naivasha and Nakuru. This was in relation to the violence that followed the bungled national elections of December 2007. In furtherance of his political support for Kibaki's PNU at the time, he was accused of organising a Kikuyu politico-religious group, the Mungiki, in the post-election violence. Overall, the post-election violence of 2007 is said to have claimed about 1300 lives. Uhuru maintained his innocence and wanted his name cleared. On 8 March 2011, while serving as minister in Kibaki's government, he was indicted after being summoned to appear before the ICC pre-trial chamber. He was to appear at The Hague on 8 April 2011 alongside five other suspects. On 29 September 2011, while seeking to exonerate himself, Uhuru Kenyatta put up a spirited fight as he was being cross-examined by ICC Chief prosecutor Luis Moreno Ocampo in The Hague, denying any links with the outlawed Mungiki sect. He said Prime Minister Raila Odinga should take political responsibility for the acts of violence and killings that followed the 2007 presidential elections in Kenya. He told the three judges that "by telling his supporters election results were being rigged, fanned tensions and then failed to use his influence to quell the violence that followed the announcement of the 2007 presidential results."

Though Uhuru had previously dismissed ICC summons, he changed his decision along the way. Together with his two other co-accused suspects, Head of Civil Service, Ambassador Francis Muthaura and former Police Commissioner Hussein Ali, the trio honoured the ICC Summons that sought to determine whether their cases met the set standards for international trials. On 23 January 2012, the ICC confirmed the cases against Kenyatta and Muthaura although the charges against Muthaura were subsequently dropped. Serious concerns about the case have been raised, particularly the nature of the evidence being used against Kenyatta. There are also serious concerns about witness tampering and indeed, a number of witnesses have disappeared or died, which is the reason cited by the ICC for dropping charges against Mathaura. On a 12 October 2013 speech to the African Union in which he set a belligerent tone, Uhuru accused the ICC of being "a toy of declining imperial powers".

On 31 October 2013, the ICC postponed Kenyatta's trial for crimes against humanity by three months until 5 February 2014 after the defense had requested more time.

On 8 October 2014, Kenyatta appeared before the ICC in The Hague. He was called to appear at the ICC "status conference" when the prosecution said evidence needed to go ahead with a trial was being withheld. In a speech to the Kenyan parliament Kenyatta said that he was going to The Hague in a personal capacity — not as president of the country — so as not to compromise the sovereignty of Kenyans. Kenyatta did not speak in court, but denied the charges in comments to journalists as he left the court to catch a flight back home. "We as Kenyans, we know where we came from, we know where we are going, and nobody will tell us what to do," he said. The judges adjourned the hearings and charges were dropped on 13 March 2015.

== The National Alliance Party (TNA) ==
On 20 May 2012, Uhuru Kenyatta attended the elaborately assembled and much-publicized launch of The National Alliance party in a modern high-tech dome at the Kenyatta International Conference Centre. His presence at the TNA launch was a strong indication that he would contest for the party's presidential nomination ticket in his quest for the presidency in the 2013 General Elections.

The Justice and Constitutional Affairs Minister Eugene Wamalwa and Eldoret North Constituency MP William Ruto led more than 70 MPs in attending the function. The Speaker of the East African Legislative Assembly, Abdi Ramadhan, Cabinet Ministers Mohamed Yusuf Haji, Jamleck Irungu Kamau, Dr. Naomi Shaaban, Samuel Poghisio, Professor Sam Ongeri and Dr. Mohammed Kuti and MPs Charles Cheruiyot Keter, Aden Bare Duale and Mohamed Maalim Mohamud also attended the event.

Speeches at the launch revolved around the need for a thriving economy, the need for the rights of people of all classes in society to be championed, the need for peaceful co-existence, the need for visionary and committed leadership, the need for transformative leadership, the need for a youthful crop of committed professionals in leadership, the need for free and fair nomination and election processes in the General Election, the need for an economically empowered youth and a call to bring an end to divisive and sectarian interests in politics to safeguard Kenya from sliding to dictatorship. Machel Waikenda was the director of communications and secretary of arts and entertainment of the National Alliance, from April 2012 to August 2013 and he led the media and communications department of the party during the 2013 elections.

=== By-elections (17 September 2012) ===
On 17 September 2012, The National Alliance party had its first real test when it contested various civic and parliamentary positions in a by-election that covered 17 seats in total; 3 parliamentary and 14 civic. Overall, 133,054 votes were cast in the by-elections and TNA led the pack after it garnered 38.89% or 51,878 votes, followed by Orange Democratic Movement with 33.7% or 44,837 votes, Party of National Unity with 4.46% or 5,929 votes, Wiper Democratic Movement with 4.44% or 5,912 votes and United Democratic Forum with 4.15% or 5,520 votes.

TNA won civic and parliamentary seats in 7 different counties while its closest challengers, ODM won seats in 4 counties. The National Alliance Party remained a strong contender for the following year's general elections, having received major defections from other big political parties of Kenya. The successful election of TNA's main candidates (Uhuru Kenyatta and William Ruto) continued to enhance TNA's viability.

In January 2013, however, TNA merged with URP to form the Jubilee Alliance Party (JAP).

== 2013 presidential elections ==
Uhuru Kenyatta's party, The National Alliance (TNA) joined William Ruto's United Republican Party (URP), Najib Balala's Republican Congress Party (RCP) and Charity Ngilu's National Rainbow Coalition party to form the Jubilee Alliance coalition. Various opinion polls prior to the election placed Uhuru as one of the main contenders, and his Jubilee Alliance as among the most popular. The other formidable coalition was the Coalition For Reform and Democracy (CORD), led by Raila Odinga.

In undercover video footage, released in a BBC news report on 19 March 2018, the managing director of Cambridge Analytica, a political consultancy that worked to elect Donald Trump in the 2016 American presidential election, boasted that his firm had run successful presidential election campaigns in Kenya in 2013 and 2017, though he did not name Kenyatta explicitly. "We have re-branded the entire party twice, written the manifesto, done research, analysis, messaging," Turnbull said, of the campaigns that his company managed in Kenya. "I think we wrote all the speeches, and we staged the whole thing—so just about every element of this candidate." A Jubilee Party vice president admitted on 20 March 2018, that the party had hired an affiliate of Cambridge Analytica for "branding" in the 2017 election.

Uhuru Kenyatta was officially declared the president elect on Saturday 9 March at 2:44 pm.

As per the IEBC's official results, Uhuru got 6,173,433 of the 12,221,053 valid votes cast ahead of the second placed Raila Odinga who garnered 5,340,546 (43.7%). Uhuru's result was 50.51% of the vote and was above the 50% plus 1 vote threshold set out in the 2010 constitution, thus making him the president-elect.

=== Results dispute ===
There was some discontent with the official results, as would be expected in such a hotly contested election, especially in Raila Odinga's strongholds. The inordinate delay in releasing the results and the technical failure of some safeguards and election equipment deployed by the IEBC did not help the perception that the election had been less than free and fair.

Further, an exit poll conducted by UCSD Professor Clark Gibson and James Long, Asst. Prof. and University of Washington suggested that neither Odinga nor Kenyatta had attained the 50% plus one vote threshold. Analysts have contended that even though elections for five other levels were held in Kenya at the same time, their national turnout levels and total vote tallies were about 16% less than the presidential total; e.g. while 10.6 million voters elected candidates for member of the National Assembly, the Senate and the 47 gubernatorial seats, almost 2 million more voted in the presidential election. This has fueled concern and speculations of vote manipulation in President Kenyatta's favor.

Two groups disputed these results and filed petitions challenging various aspects of it at the Supreme Court of Kenya to contest the result. The groups were the Coalition For Reform and Democracy, CORD, led by Raila Odinga, and the Africa Centre for Open Governance (AFRICOG). Uhuru Kenyatta and his running mate were respondents in these cases and were represented by Fred Ngatia and Katwa Kigen respectively.

=== Supreme Court Judgement ===
The Supreme court judges unanimously upheld the election of Uhuru Kenyatta as Kenya's fourth president after rejecting Raila Odinga's petition in a verdict delivered on Saturday 30 March 2013. Chief Justice Willy Mutunga in his ruling said the elections were indeed conducted in compliance with the Constitution and the law.

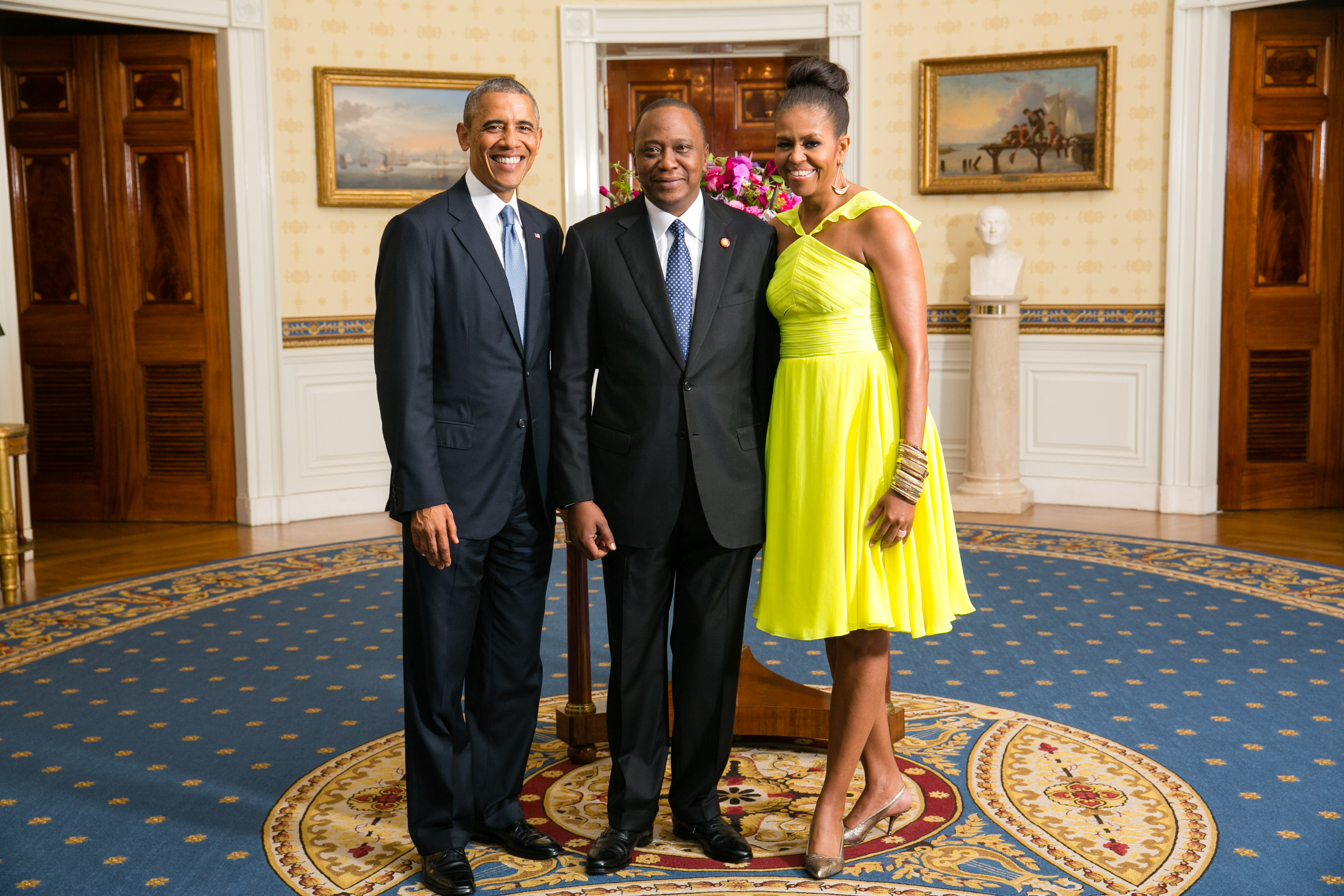
U.S. President Barack Obama and First Lady Michelle Obama greet President Uhuru Kenyatta in the Blue Room during a U.S.-Africa Leaders Summit dinner at the White House, 5 August 2014.

=== Presidential swearing-in at Kasarani Stadium ===
After the Supreme Court dismissed the petitions the swearing in ceremony was held on 9 April 2013 at the Moi International Sports Centre, Kasarani, Nairobi, in accordance to Article 141 (2) (b) of the constitution which stipulates that in case the Supreme Court upholds the victory of the president-elect, the swearing in will take place on "the first Tuesday following the seventh day following the date on which the court renders a decision declaring the election to be valid".

== Presidency (2013–2022) ==
Presidential Standard of Uhuru Kenyatta

During his inaugural speech, Uhuru promised economic transformation through Vision 2030, unity among all Kenyans, free maternal care and that he will serve all Kenyans. He also promised to improve the standards of education in Kenya. During the Madaraka day Celebrations, a national holiday celebrated to the country's independence on 1 June, President Uhuru Kenyatta announced free maternal care in all public health facilities, a move that was welcomed by many Kenyans.

On 1 September 2017, the Supreme Court of Kenya nullified the re-election of Uhuru Kenyatta after the Independent Electoral and Boundaries Commission (IEBC) had announced him the winner on 8 August 2017. As a result of that, there was a need for the election to be held once again. It was scheduled for 26 October 2017. After the reelection, Uhuru Kenyatta emerged the winner once again.

He was sworn in on 28 November 2017 for his second presidential term.

In 2021, drought is again taking its toll. According to the UN, more than 465,000 children under the age of five are malnourished. Food insecurity affects more than 2.5 million people in the country. Uhuru Kenyatta speaks of a "national disaster". However, he is criticised for the slow humanitarian response and lack of planning.

The Mukuru Kwa Njenga slum in Nairobi is being razed in October 2021 to make way for the widening of a road, leaving 40,000 people homeless overnight, with no offer of alternative accommodation.

=== Challenges ===
The major challenges his administration faced included high cost of living, rising public debt, a high public wage bill and allegations of corruption among people within his government. The 2017 general election and its violence is also a challenge that threatened not only his presidency but also the future of the East African Nation.

==== Public Wage Bill ====
The high public wage was a headache to Uhuru's administration. At the start of his term, the President decried the high wage bill which was at 12% of GDP (as against a recommended 7%). In 2015, the President stated that the wage bill was at 50% of the total annual revenue collection of government. In an attempt to curtail it, the President announced a pay cut for himself and his Cabinet in March 2014, reducing his salary by 20%. It was hoped that the high earners in government would follow suit but this did not materialize. Another measure was the newly created constitutional Salaries and Remuneration Commission which it was hoped would regularize salaries but it has faced an up hill battle against Members of Parliament, who wish to protect their earnings and labor unions. The President thereafter ordered an audit of the government payroll so as to flush out ghost workers. The audit identified 12,000 ghost workers. In the meantime, lower cadre government workers have demanded pay rises, more so by teachers and health workers, who have gone on strikes at various times to demand the increase. The strikes in the health sector mainly affect the counties, Kenya's other level of government, as it is managed by the devolved units.

==== Anti-corruption efforts ====
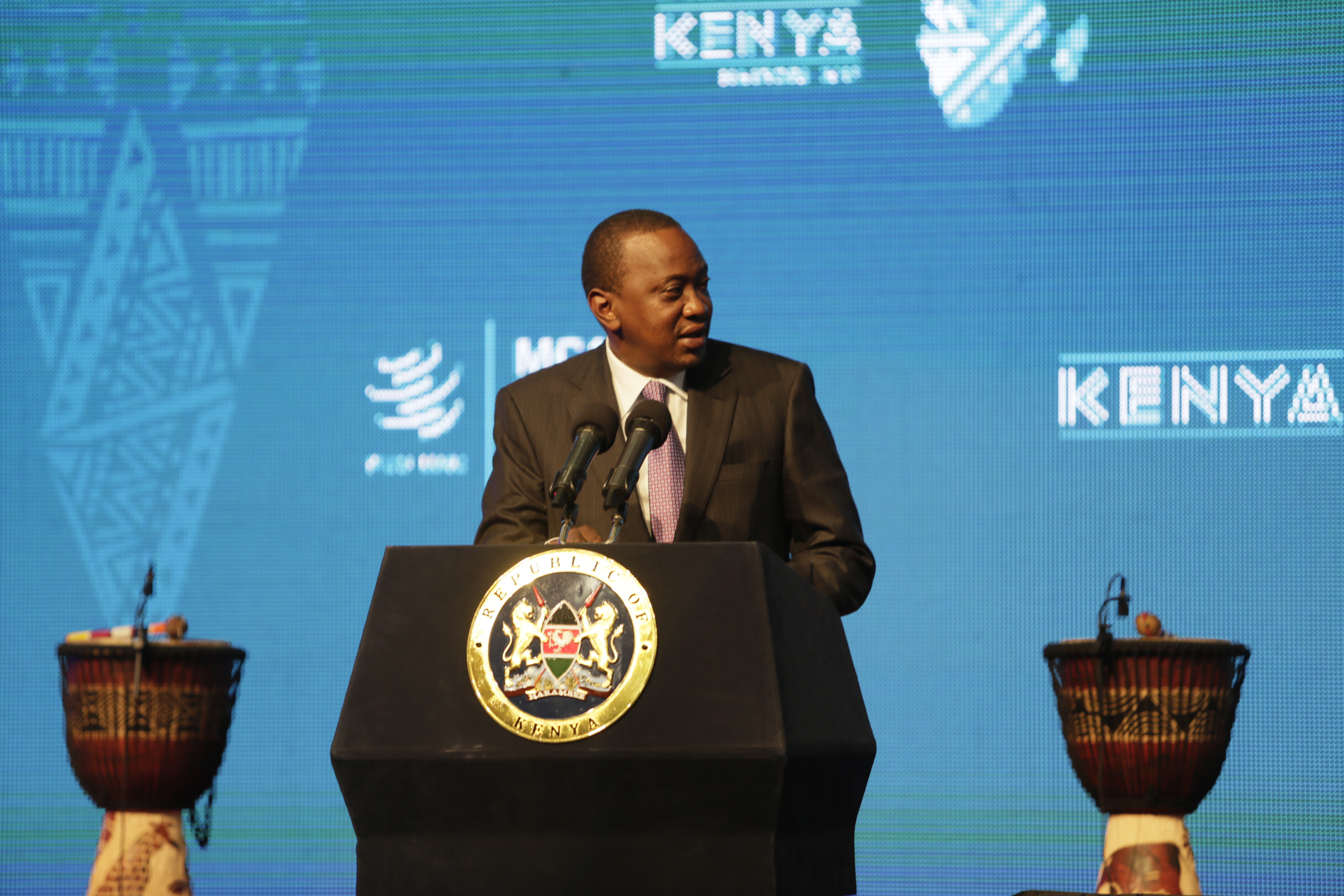
Kenyatta at the 10th WTO Ministerial Conference in Nairobi, 2015

On 28 June 2018, Kenyatta declared a major crackdown on corruption and stated that no one was immune from corruption charges in Kenya. Kenyatta also stated his own brother Muhoho, a director in a company that had been accused in parliament of importing contraband sugar, should be charged if there is clear evidence against him.

On 11 August 2018, Mohammed Abdalla Swazuri, the chairman of National Land Commission, and Atanas Kariuki Maina, managing director of the Kenya Railways Corporation, were among 18 officials, businesspeople and companies arrested on corruption charges involving land allocation for the $3 billion flagship Nairobi-Mombasa railway. On 7 December 2018, Joe Sang, the CEO of the Kenya Pipeline Company (KPC), was arrested with four other senior officials in connection with the loss of an unspecified amount of money during the construction of an oil jetty in the western city of Kisumu. On 22 July 2019, Kenya's finance minister Henry Rotich became the country's first sitting minister to be arrested for corruption. 27 other people were arrested with Rotich as well. On 6 December 2019, federal authorities arrested Nairobi Governor Mike Sonko on corruption charges. On 14 January 2020, Kenyatta replaced Rotich with Labour Secretary Ukur Yatani.

On 28 May 2020, a breakthrough in Kenyatta's pledge to combat corruption in Kenya occurred when 40 civil servants and 14 private sector officials, including National Youth Service (NYS) Director General Richard Ndubai, were arrested on charges related to the National Youth Service scandal.

On 9 December 2020, it was confirmed by the Kenya News Agency that the National Anti-Corruption Campaign Steering Committee (NACCSC) was in the process of strengthening its collaboration with other crime fighting agencies, including those in Kenyatta's government. The group had National Government Administrative Officers (NGAO) in hopes they would support the County Anti-Corruption Civil Oversight Committee (CACCOC). The day before, Winnie Guchu, who serves in Kenyatta's government as the Chief Administrative Secretary (CAS) in the Office of the Attorney General and the Department of Justice, confirmed in a press conference that she had met with members of CACCOC to strengthen relations. On 11 December 2020, the Kenyan government's Ethics and Anti-Corruption Commission (EACC) released a statement confirming that Robert Pavel Oimeke, the director general of Kenya's Energy and Petroleum Regulatory Authority, was arrested and taken into police custody on charges of demanding 200,000 Kenyan shillings ($1,795) to approve the re-opening of a petrol station that had been shut down over violations. On 21 December 2020, Nairobi County Assembly Speaker Benson Mutura replaced Sonko, who was removed from office four days prior, as Governor of Nairobi.

=== Anti-corruption rhetoric and offshore holdings ===
The 2021 Pandora Papers revelations created a significant political contradiction for Uhuru Kenyatta, who had built his second-term legacy on a highly publicized "war on corruption" and a demand for financial integrity among public officials. While Kenyatta had famously declared that every civil servant's wealth must be "declared and known," the leaked records from the ICIJ showed his family utilized the Varies Foundation in Panama — a jurisdiction known for extreme secrecy—to manage a portfolio of stocks and bonds worth over $30 million. This "secret foundation" was designed to bypass traditional probate and public disclosure, directly clashing with his 2018 executive order requiring the Ethics and Anti-Corruption Commission to conduct lifestyle audits on state officers. Critics argued that the use of these offshore structures facilitated capital flight and tax avoidance, undermining the domestic economy he was sworn to protect. Despite his administration's aggressive pursuit of tax evaders through the Kenya Revenue Authority, the discovery that his family—including his mother Mama Ngina and brother Muhoho benefited from tax-haven confidentiality led to widespread accusations of hypocrisy, as it suggested a "double standard" where the ruling elite could shield their wealth from the very transparency laws they imposed on the citizenry.

== KEMSA "COVID-19 Millionaires" scandal ==
In 2020, the Kenyatta administration faced significant public backlash following revelations of massive graft at the Kenya Medical Supplies Authority (KEMSA). An investigative report by NTV Kenya titled "COVID-19 Millionaires" alleged that KSh 7.8 billion intended for the pandemic response had been misappropriated through irregular tenders awarded to politically connected firms. The Auditor General subsequently confirmed that at least KSh 2.3 billion was lost due to procurement violations and the purchase of supplies at double the market price. While Kenyatta ordered the Ethics and Anti-Corruption Commission (EACC) to fast-track investigations, the scandal led to widespread protests and accusations that the administration was shielding high-ranking individuals and "briefcase companies" from prosecution. The scandal severely impacted the government's credibility in managing emergency funds and was cited by critics as a low point in Kenyatta's second-term anti-corruption efforts.

== Eurobond scandal and debt transparency ==
In 2014, the Kenyatta administration issued Kenya's first sovereign bond, raising $2 billion (approx. KSh 176 billion) intended for infrastructure development and debt repayment. However, the project became mired in controversy when the Auditor General, Edward Ouko, reported in 2015 that KSh 215 billion from the Eurobond proceeds could not be accounted for in the records of the respective ministries. Opposition figures, led by Raila Odinga, alleged that the funds had been embezzled, leading to a protracted political standoff. Kenyatta faced criticism for his public rebuke of the Auditor General during a 2016 governance summit, where he dismissed the investigation into the Federal Reserve Bank of New York as a waste of time. While the Treasury maintained that no funds were lost, the scandal intensified public concerns over the sustainability of Kenya's national debt, which increased nearly fivefold during Kenyatta's presidency.

== Foreign relations ==
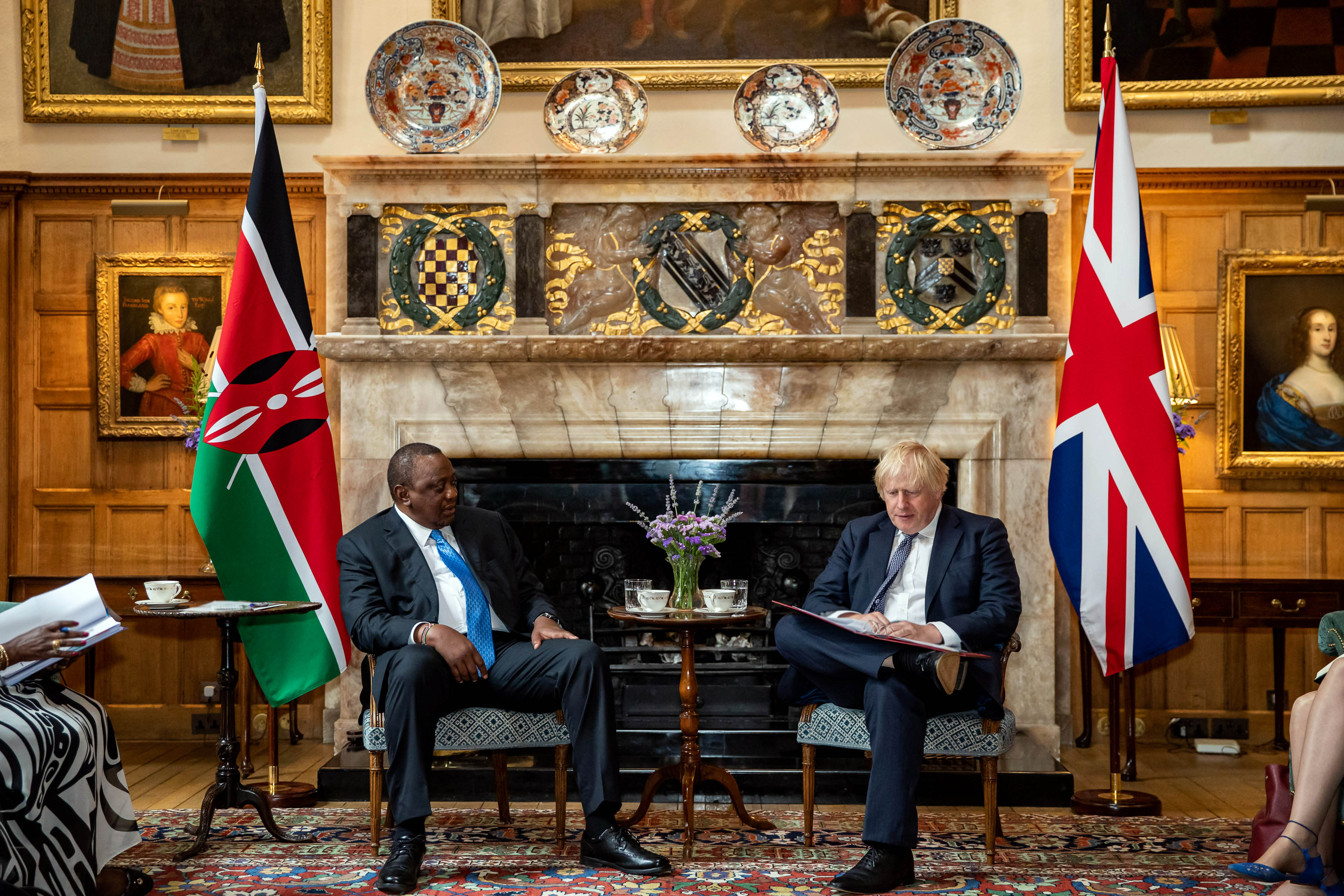
Kenyatta with Boris Johnson in 2021

As the President, Kenyatta's foreign relations were dominated by the ICC question. His relations with the West were expected to be cold, more so after the West warned Kenyans not to elect him as president. The United Kingdom promised to have only essential contacts with him if he were elected. However, his relationship with the West thawed significantly and he participated in the US–Africa summit as well as a Somalia summit in the United Kingdom. The ICC accused his government of frustrating its investigation efforts into the case, although it absolved the President personally of any involvement in the frustration.

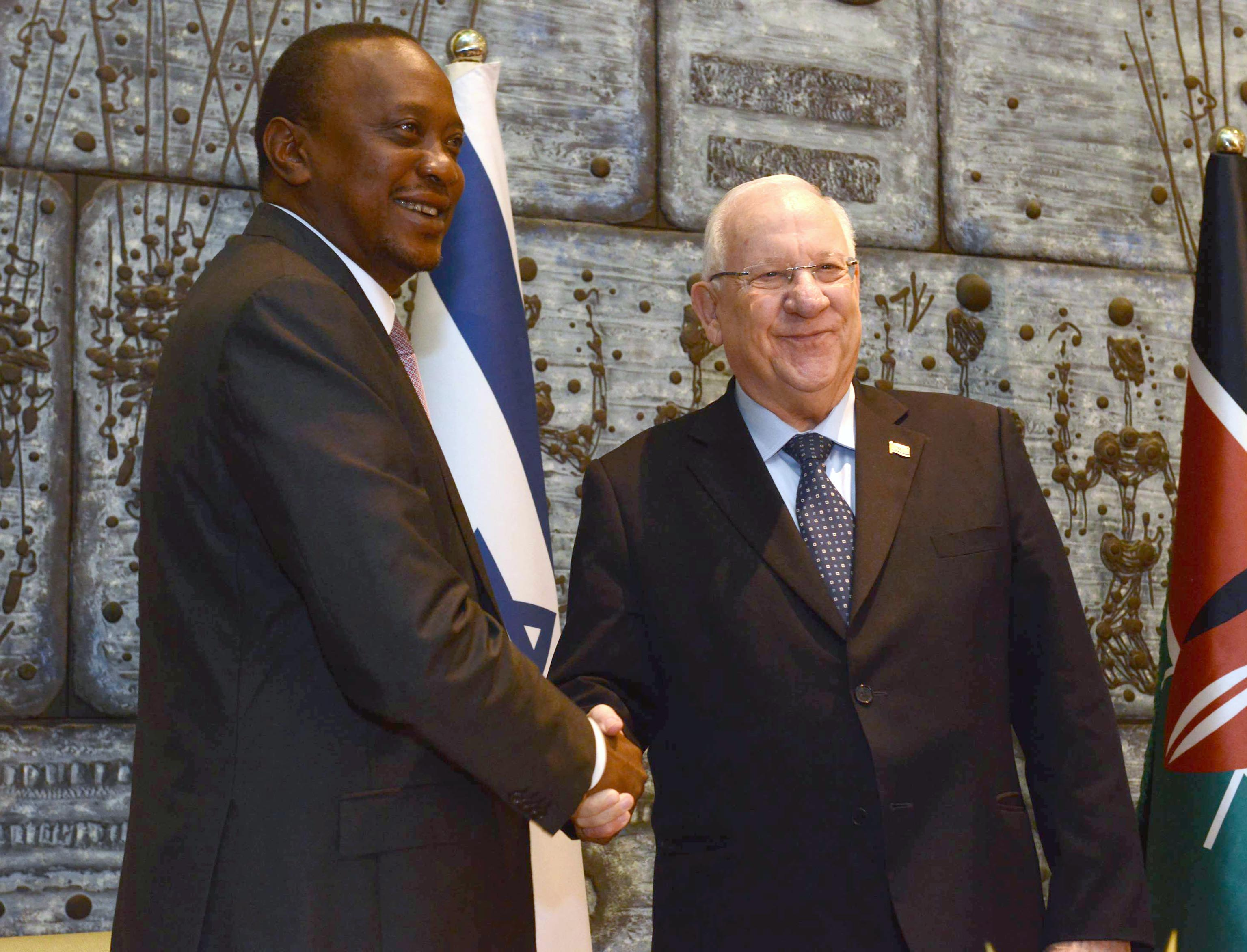
Kenyatta with Israeli President Reuben Rivlin, photographed in front of art by Moshe Castel.

His activities, however, were more robust at the African level where he has pushed more intra-Africa trade and economic independence of African nations. In November 2014, he launched consultations to reform the United Nations Security Council to expand the voice of Africa in the council. He successfully rallied the AU against the ICC culminating in an Extraordinary Summit of the African Heads of State which resolved that sitting African Heads of State should not appear before the ICC. The AU further asked the Security Council to suspend his trial at the ICC; for the first time ever, the Security Council resolution was defeated by abstention with 9 members of the Council abstaining rather than voting against so as not to offend Kenyatta. The Assembly of State Parties of the ICC would two days later amend the ICC statute to allow for one to appear by video link, a proposal President Kenyatta had made when he was Deputy Prime Minister.

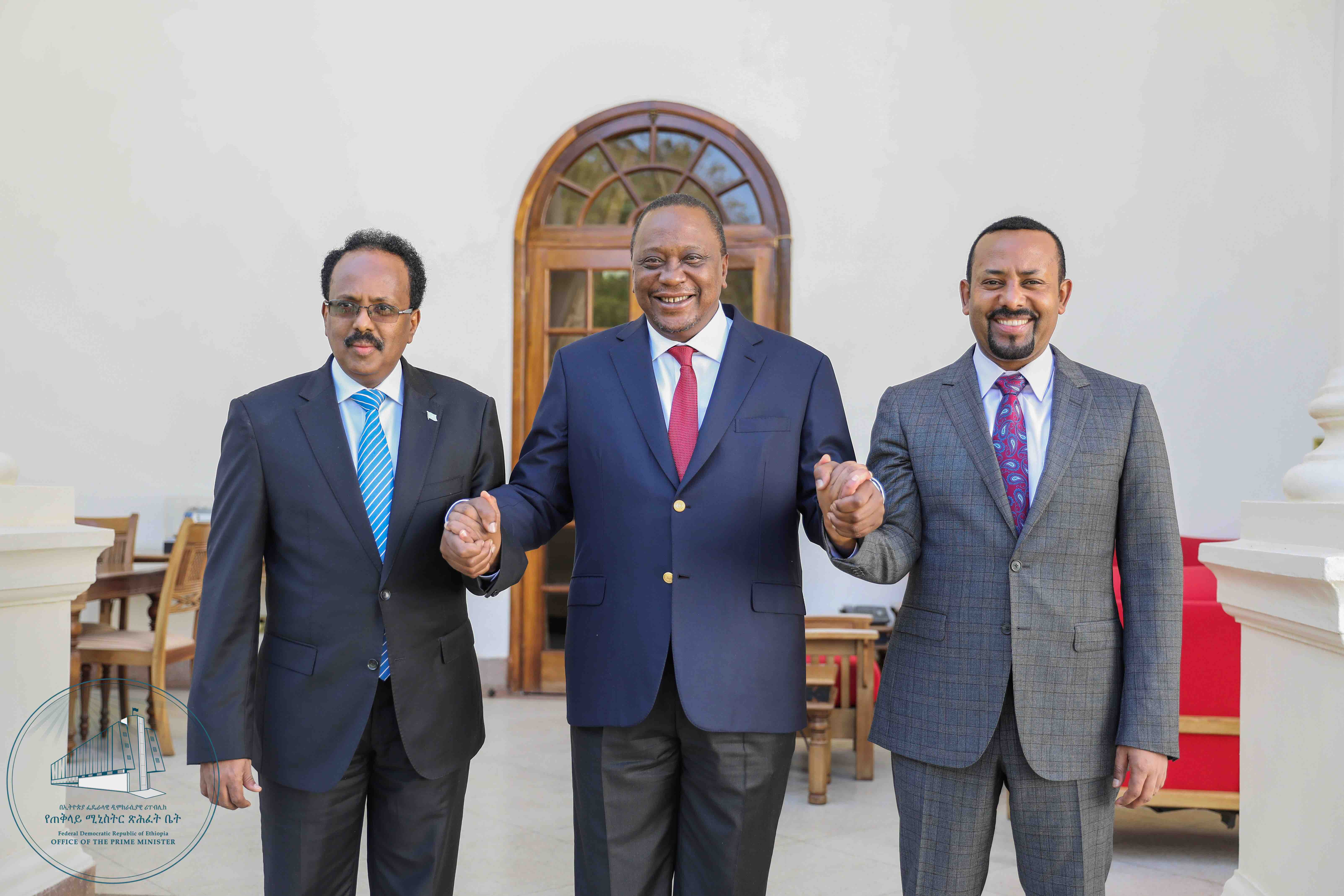
Kenyatta with Mohamed Abdullahi Mohamed and Abiy Ahmed Ali in 2019

Kenyatta led and negotiated peace agreements in South Sudan and in Democratic Republic of Congo. At the East African level, he developed a close relationship with the Ugandan President Yoweri Museveni and Rwanda President Paul Kagame, creating the Coalition of the Willing, a caucus within the EAC that has signed on to more joint development and economic agreements than the other EAC partners, including a joint tourist visa.

He attended the funeral of Nelson Mandela and was received warmly by the crowds. He also attended the funeral of President Michael Sata of Zambia in November 2014. However, it had been perceived that his administration's relations with Botswana were strained due to Botswana's support of the ICC process. He visited Botswana to remove this perception and Botswana voted in favor of the AU's ICC Resolution.

His government had closer ties with China which was funding most of his infrastructure projects.

=== Foreign trips ===
Map highlighting countries where Kenyatta made official visits while president

In November 2020, it was noted that he was the most traveled Kenyan president compared to his predecessors. One of the leading national newspapers noted that Uhuru Kenyatta had been out of the country 43 times as of November 2015 in a period of about three years since he took office in 2013, as compared to 33 times over a span of 10 years by his predecessor Mwai Kibaki. The president's strategic communications unit came out in defense of these trips stating that these trips had yielded more than what it cost the taxpayers to finance them.

== Pandora Papers listing ==
In October 2021, the International Consortium of Investigative Journalists (ICIJ) released the Pandora Papers, a massive leak of nearly 12 million documents that identified then-President Uhuru Kenyatta and six family members as beneficiaries of a secretive network of 11 to 13 offshore entities. These holdings, registered in tax havens like Panama and the British Virgin Islands (BVI), included foundations such as Varies and Criselle, which were used to manage bank accounts and real estate valued at over $30 million (approx. KSh 3.3 billion). Key assets uncovered included a London apartment worth nearly $1 million and an investment portfolio of stocks and bonds valued at $31.6 million as of 2016. While the investigation found no direct evidence that the Kenyattas stole state funds, the revelations caused significant public outcry in Kenya, where the average annual salary is less than $8,000. Critics pointed to the moral contradiction of a leader who championed anti-corruption and transparency while secretly shielding a vast family fortune from public scrutiny and potential domestic taxation. Although Kenyatta claimed the leak would "enhance financial transparency," he did not directly address why his family utilized these complex offshore structures, which experts argue deprive the national economy of vital capital and shift the tax burden onto ordinary citizens.

== Approval ratings ==
His government's first year in office received low ratings from the general public. This is after a poll by Synovate indicated that more than half of the population was unhappy with how the government had conducted its affairs. The same polls also ranked the presidency as the second most trusted institution after the media. After his appearance at The Hague for his ICC case in October 2014, his poll ratings improved to 71%, according to a poll by Synovate. A poll by Gallup in August 2014 put his approval ratings at 78%, giving him the third best job approval ratings among African Presidents after Ian Khama of Botswana and Ibrahim Boubacar Keïta of Mali. In 2015, due to allegations of corruption against some members of his government, his poll ratings dropped to his lowest rating yet at 33%, according to an Infotrack poll. By February 2017, his poll numbers had, however, risen to 57%. His poll numbers in 2018 rose to 74% in light of a renewed effort to battle corruption.

== Disobedience of court orders ==
During his presidency, Uhuru Kenyatta faced persistent criticism from legal bodies and the Judiciary of Kenya for what was described as a habitual disregard for the rule of law and judicial independence. The most prominent instance of this friction was his years-long refusal to appoint six judges recommended by the Judicial Service Commission (JSC), despite multiple High Court rulings declaring his inaction unconstitutional. Former Chief Justice David Maraga famously issued a public rebuke of the Executive in 2020, accusing the administration of defying over 15 valid court orders, including directives regarding the illegal deportation of activist Miguna Miguna and the unlawful demolition of homes in Kariobangi. Furthermore, the courts repeatedly struck down executive actions, such as the transfer of the Kenya Meat Commission to the Ministry of Defence and the Building Bridges Initiative (BBI), which the Supreme Court ultimately ruled was an unconstitutional presidential attempt to amend the constitution. While Kenyatta defended his actions by citing intelligence reports on the integrity of certain nominees, critics and bar associations argued his selective enforcement of the law created a "constitutional crisis" and fostered a culture of executive impunity.

== Post-presidency ==
In 2025, Kenyatta was appointed as a mediator by the East African Community and the Southern African Development Community in the Democratic Republic of the Congo amid the M23 campaign (2022–present).

On 1 August 2025, Kenyatta returned to State House, Nairobi which was his first visit since handing over the presidency in 2022 to participate in a high-level summit of the East African Community (EAC) and SADC.

In September 2025, at a Jubilee Party delegates conference, Kenyatta publicly criticised his successor's administration, accusing it of eroding key gains made during his own term (including maternal-health programmes and infrastructure).

=== Express-way controversy ===
In 2025, a high-stakes tax dispute involving the Kenya Revenue Authority (KRA) and Edge Worth Properties Ltd revealed that the family of former President Uhuru Kenyatta held undisclosed financial interests in the Nairobi Expressway project. According to findings by the Tax Appeals Tribunal in July 2025, Edge Worth Properties—which supplied land and construction materials for the highway—was a proxy for Enke Investments, a firm owned by former First Lady Mama Ngina Kenyatta and Muhoho Kenyatta. The tribunal case disclosed that in 2022 alone, Edge Worth declared KSh 1 billion (approx. $7.6 million) in dividends payable to Enke Investments, prompting the KRA to initially demand KSh 249.2 million in unpaid taxes over hidden ownership and irregular profit claims. Court documents confirmed significant profits through these sub-contracts, leading to calls from lawmakers for a full parliamentary probe into potential conflicts of interest during Kenyatta's tenure.

== Awards and decorations ==
=== National honours ===
- Kenya:
  - Chief of the Order of the Golden Heart of Kenya

=== Foreign honours ===
- Barbados:
  - Honorary Member of the Order of Freedom of Barbados (FB) (6 October 2021)
- Namibia:
  - First Class of the Order of the Welwitschia (21 March 2019)
- Serbia:
  - Order of the Republic of Serbia, Second Class (2016)
- Portugal:
  - Grand Collar of the Order of Prince Henry (28 June 2022)
- Burundi:
  - National Order of the Republic (7 July 2022)

=== Awards ===
- 2013, Youngest Kenyan President, Guinness World Records
- 2015, Africa's President of the Year 2014–2015, African Union
- 2015, ICTs in Sustainable Development Award, International Telecommunication Union
- 2017, Most Severe Plastic Bag Penalty, Guinness World Records
- 2018, Babacar Ndiaye Award, Africa Road Builders
- 2018, World 1st Blue Economy Conference Award, African Union Commission
- 2022, African Gender Award, African Union

== See also ==
- Presidency of Uhuru Kenyatta
- List of heads of state of Kenya
- 2013 Kenyan general election
- 2017 Kenyan general election

Party political offices
Preceded by Daniel arap Moi	KANU nominee for President of Kenya; 2002	Vacant
New political alliance	Jubilee Alliance nominee for President of Kenya; 2013	Alliance dissolved
New political party	Jubilee Party nominee for President of Kenya; Aug 2017, Oct 2017	Succeeded by Raila Odinga
National Assembly (Kenya)
Preceded by Moses Mwihia	Member of Parliament for Gatundu South; 2003–2013	Succeeded by Jossy Ngugi
Political offices
Preceded by John Michuki	Minister of Finance; 2009–2012	Succeeded by Robinson Michael Githae
Preceded by Mwai Kibaki	President of Kenya; 2013–2022	Succeeded by William Ruto
